= Syllabus der Pflanzenfamilien =

Plant taxonomy text by Adolf Engler

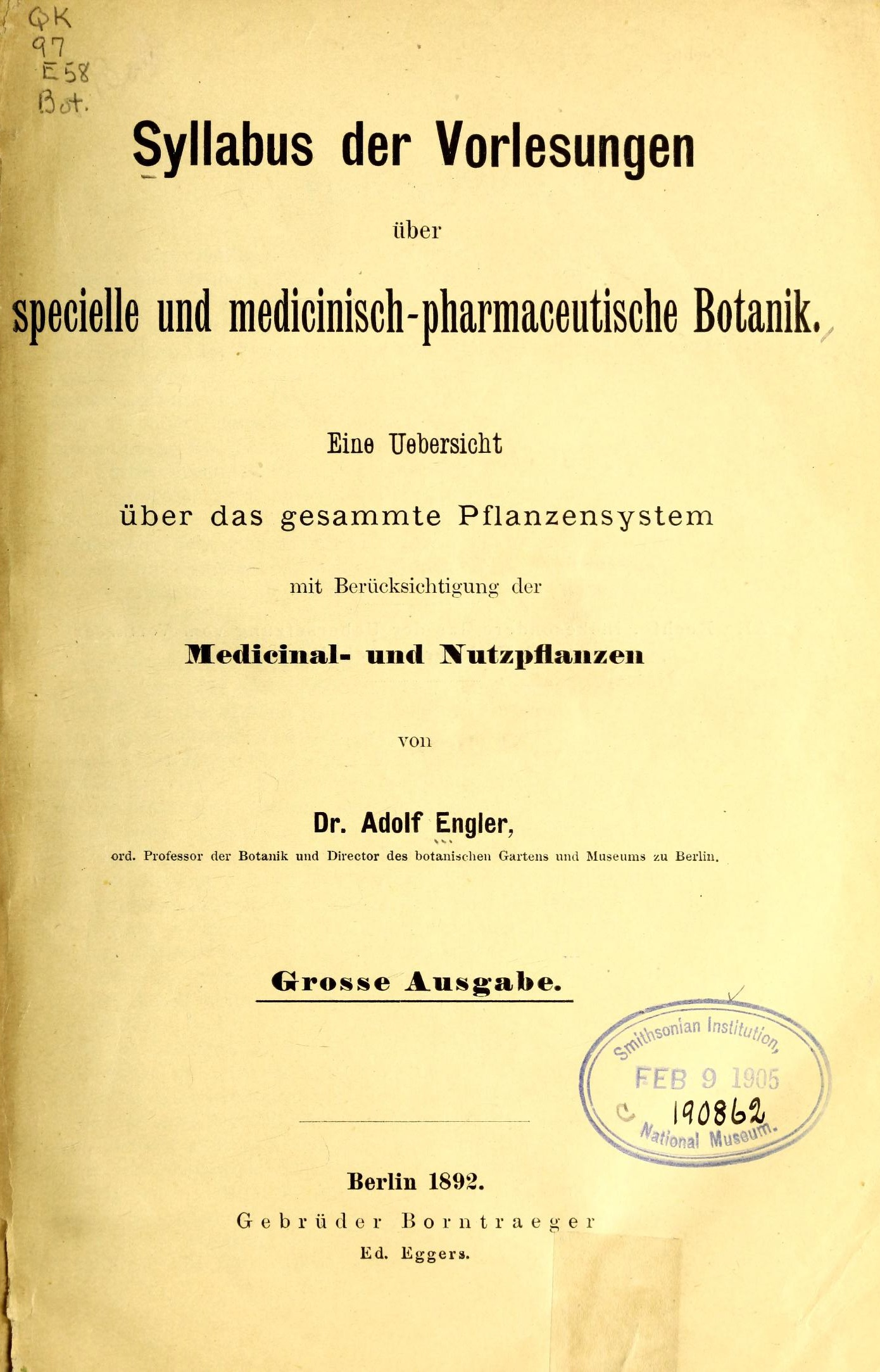
- Cover page of first edition
- Author: Adolf Engler
- Language: German
- Subject: Botany
- Published: 1892–
- Publisher: Gebrüder Borntraeger Verlag
- Publication place: Germany
- Media type: Print

Syllabus der Pflanzenfamilien (1892–) by Adolf Engler (1844–1930) is a complete revision of plant families down to generic level and often even further. As such it forms part of the Engler system of plant taxonomy.

Engler's starting point was that of Eichler who had been the first to use phylogenetic principles, and reflected the new post-Darwinian perspective, although Engler himself did not think that his was. His modified Eichler schema first appeared in 1886 in his Guide to Breslau Botanic Garden (of which he was the director) and was expanded in his Syllabus in 1892. This reflected the new post-Darwinian perspective. Engler's Syllabus der Pflanzenfamilien first appeared in 1892 with the title Syllabus der Vorlesungen über specielle und medicinisch-pharmaceutische Botanik. Many subsequent editions have appeared since, and it was continued after Engler's death in 1930. The most recent edition was the 13th in 2009. A number of references to the Engler system actually refer to later revisions ('modified Engler system') undertaken by Melchior and colleagues, the 12th edition of the Syllabus, also referred to as the Melchior system.

== Synopses ==
Engler's Botanical Ranks
German	Latin	English
Abteilung	divisio	Division
Unterabteilung	subdivisio	Subdivision
Klasse	classis	Class
Reihe	ordo	Order
Unterreihe	subordo	Suborder
Fam.	familia	Family
Unterfam.	subfamilia	Subfamily
Gruppe (§)	tribus	Tribe
Gattung	genus	Genus
Art	species	Species

=== First edition (1892) ===
Review of previous systems p. xvii Schema p. xx

- Myxothallophyta p. 1
  - Myxomycetes
- Euthallophyta p. 3
  - Schizophyta
  - Dinoflagellata
  - Bacillariales
  - Gamophyceae
  - Fungi
- Embryophyta Zoidiogama (Archegoniatae)
  - Bryophyta p. 43
  - Pteridophyta p. 53
- Embryophyta Siphonogama (Phanerogamae)
  - Gymnospermae p. 59
  - Angiospermae p. 64
    - Class Chalazogamae p. 64
    - Class Acrogamae p. 65
      - Subclass Monocotyledoneae 10 Orders
        - 1. Pandanales p. 65
        - ...
        - 8. Liliiflorae p. 81
        - 9. Scitamineae p. 87
        - 10 Microspermae p. 89
      - Subclass Dicotyledoneae 2 groups
        - Group Archichlamydeae 23 orders
          - 1. Piperales p. 93
          - ...
          - 19. Parietales p. 138 24 families
          - ...
          - Violaceae p. 142
          - ...
          - 20. Opuntiales p. 144
          - ...
          - 23. Polygonales p. 101
        - Group Sympetalae 9 Orders
          - 1. Ericales p. 151
          - ...
          - 9. Campanulatae p. 173

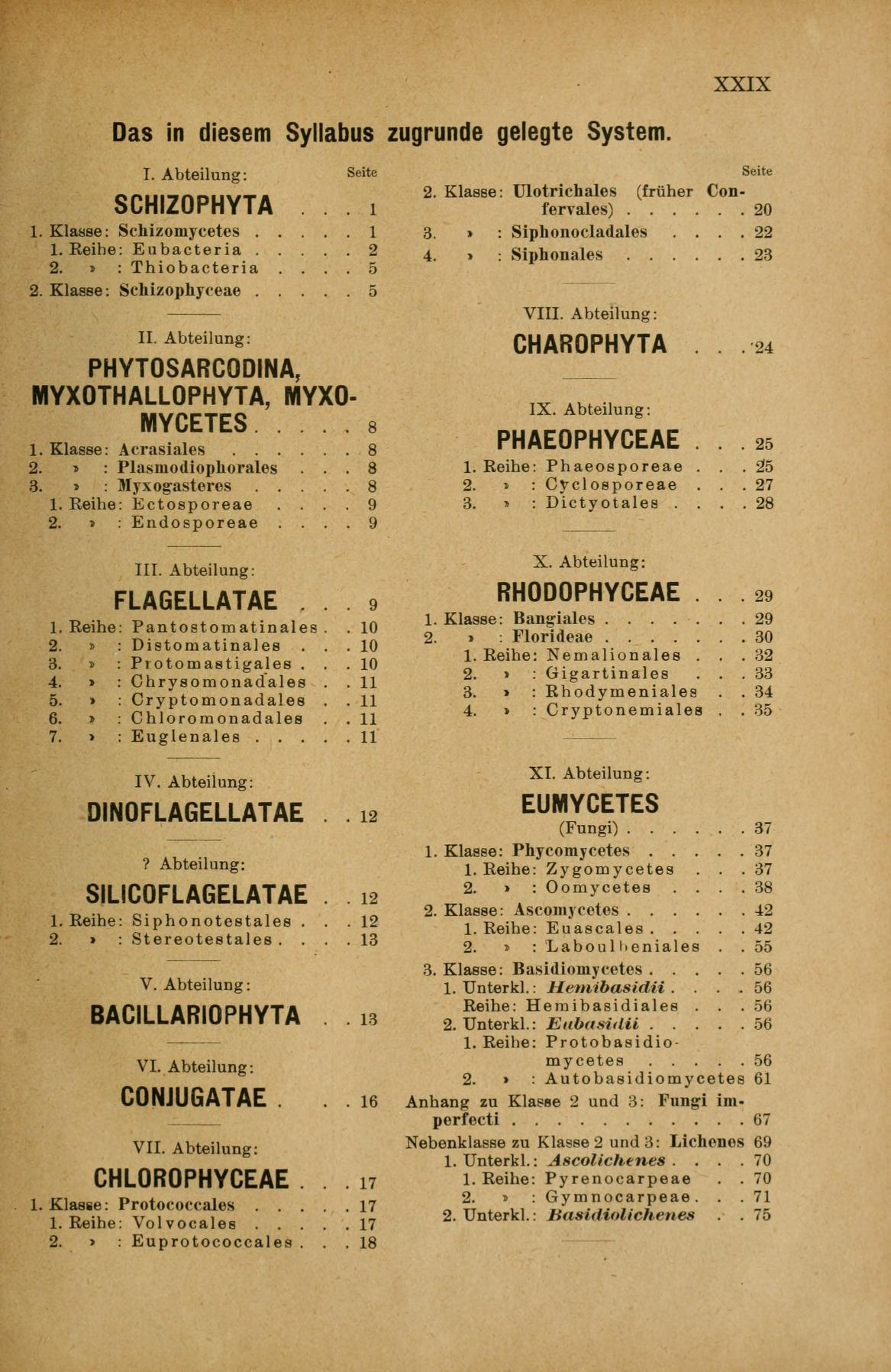
First page of synopsis from eighth edition

=== Third edition (1903) ===
The main groups of plants are shown here with page numbers in (parentheses) and some corresponding volumes in Die Natürlichen Pflanzenfamilien in [square brackets], however there are changes between editions:

Review of previous systems p. xxi

From schema and index (pp. xxiv-xxv)

- I. Abteilung. Phytosarcodina, Myxothallophyta, Myxomycetes (p. 1)
- II. Abteilung. Schizophyta (p. 3) [vol 1 part Ia]
- III. Abteilung. Flagellatae (p. 6) [vol 1 part Ia]
- IV. Abteilung. Dinoflagellatae (p. 8)
- ? Abteilung. Silicoflagellatae (p. 8)
- V. Abteilung. Zygophyceae (p. 8)
- VI. Abteilung. Chlorophyceae (p. 11) [vol 1 part II]
- VII. Abteilung. Charales (p. 15)
- VIII. Abteilung. Phaeophyceae (p. 15)
- IX. Abteilung. Dictyotales (p. 18)
- X. Abteilung. Rhodophyceae (p. 18)
- XI. Abteilung. Eumycetes (Fungi) (p. 25) [vol 1 part I]
- XII. Abteilung. Embryophyta asiphonogama (Archegoniatae) (p. 50)
  - I. Unterabteilung Bryophyta (Muscinei) (p. 51) [vol 1 part III: 1]
  - II. Unterabteilung Pteridophyta (p. 61) [vol 1 part IV]
- XIII. Abteilung. Embryophyta siphonogama (Phanerogamae) (p. 70)
  - I. Unterabteilung Gymnospermae (p. 70) [vol 2 part I]
  - II. Unterabteilung Angiospermae (p. 75) [vol 2 part I]

==== XIII Embryophyta siphonogama ====
- I. Unterabteilung Gymnospermae 6 classes (p. 70) [vol 2 part I]
- II. Unterabteilung Angiospermae 2 classes (p. 75) [vol 2 part I]
  - 1. Klasse Monocotyledoneae 11 orders (p. 76)
  - 2. Klasse Dicotyledoneae 2 subclasses (p. 106)

===== Gymnospermae =====
6 classes (p. 70)

===== Angiospermae =====
2 classes (p. 75)

- 1. Klasse Monocotyledoneae 11 orders (p. 76) [vol 2 part I]
- 2. Klasse Dicotyledoneae 2 subclasses (p. 106)

====== Monocotyledoneae ======
11 orders

- 1. Reihe Pandanales (p. 77)
- 3. Reihe Triuridales (p. 80)
- 4. Reihe Glumiflorae (p. 80)
- 5. Reihe Principes (p. 84)
- 6. Reihe Synanthae (p. 87)
- 7. Reihe Spathiflorae (p. 87)
- 8. Reihe Farinosae (p. 91)
- 9. Reihe Liliiflorae (p. 93) [vol 2 part I]
- 10. Reihe Scitamineae (p. 101)
- 11. Reihe Microspermae (p. 102)

====== Dicotyledoneae ======
2 subclasses (p. 106)

- 1. Unterklasse Archechlamydeae
- 2. Unterklasse Metachlamydeae (Sympetalae) (p. 175)

Index (p. 215)

===== Monocotyledon family structure =====
11 orders (Reihe)

====== Pandanales ======
- Pandanaceae
- Sparganiaceae
- Typhaceae

====== Helobiae ======
4 suborders

- subordo Alismatineae
  Alismataceae
  Butomaceae
- subordo Hydrocharitineae
  Hydrocharitaceae
- subordo Scheuchzeriineae
  Scheuchzeriaceae
- subordo Potamogetonineae
  Aponogetonaceae
  Juncaginaceae
  Potamogetonaceae
  Najadaceae
  Zannichelliaceae

====== Triuridales ======
- Triuridaceae

====== Glumiflorae ======
- Gramineae
  Maydeae
  Andropogoneae
  Paniceae
  Oryzeae
  Phalarideae
  Agrostideae
  Aveneae
  Festuceae
  Chlorideae
  Hordeeae
  Bambuseae
- Cyperaceae

====== Principes ======
- Palmae or Arecaceae

====== Synanthae ======
- Cyclanthaceae

====== Spathiflorae ======
- Araceae
- Lemnaceae

====== Farinosae ======
6 suborders

- Flagellariaceae
- Enantioblastae
- Bromellinewae
- Commelinineae
- Pontederiineae
- Philydrineae

====== Liliiflorae ======
3 suborders (Unterreihe) 9 families

- p. 93
1. Juncineae 1 family (p. 94)
2. Liliineae 7 families (p. 94)
3. Iridineae 1 family (p. 100)
- suborder Juncineae (p. 94)
  Juncaceae
- subordo Liliineae 7 families (p. 94)
  Stemonaceae (p. 94)
  Liliaceae (p. 94) [pages 10–91]
  subfamilia Melanthioideae 6 tribes (p. 94)
  Tofieldieae
  Helonieae
  Veratreae
  Uvularieae
  Anguillarieae
  Colchiceae
  subfamilia Herrerioideae (p. 95)
  subfamilia Asphodeloideae 8 tribes (p. 95)
  Asphodeleae
  Hemerocallideae
  Aloineae
  Aphyllantheae (p. 96)
  Johnsonieae
  Dasypogoneae
  Lomandreae
  Calectasieae
  subfamilia Allioideae 3 tribes(p. 96)
  Agapantheae
  Allieae
  Gilliesieae
  subfamilia Lilioideae 2 tribes (p. 96)
  Tulipeae 6 genera
  Scilleae 7 genera
  subfamilia Dracaenoideae 3 tribes (p. 97)
  subfamilia Asparagoideae 4 tribes (p. 97)
  subfamilia Ophiopogonoideae (p. 97)
  subfamilia Aletroideae (p. 98)
  subfamilia Luzuriagoideae (p. 98)
  subfamilia Smilacoideae (p. 98)
  Haemodoraceae (p. 98)
  Amaryllidaceae 3 subfamilies (p. 98)
  subfamilia Amaryllidoideae 2 tribes
  Amaryllideae (p. 98)
  Narcisseae (p. 99)
  subfamilia Agavoideae (p. 99)
  subfamilia Campynematoideae (p. 99)
  Velloziaceae (p. 99)
  Taccaceae (p. 99)
  Dioscoreaceae 2 tribes (p. 99)
- subordo Iridineae 2 families (p. 100)
  Iridaceae (p. 100)
  subfamilia Crocoideae
  subfamilia Iridoideae 3 tribes
  subfamilia Ixioideae 3 tribes

====== Scitamineae ======
- Musaceae p. 101
- Zingiberaceae
- Cannaceae
- Marantaceae
- Lowiaceae p. 102

====== Microspermae ======
- Orchidaceae

In modern classifications, Engler's divisions I - XI are not considered plants but are classified in other groups (although some botanists do accept Engler's divisions VII and VIII, the "green algae", as plants).

=== Thirteenth edition (2009-) ===
- Cyanoprokaryota [Part 1/1, 2012]
- Acrasia (Acrasiomycota) [Part 1/1]
- Eumycetozoa [Part 1/1]
  - Protostelia
  - Dictyostelia
  - Myxogastria (Myxomycetes)
- Phytomyxea (Plasmodiophoromycota) [Part 1/1]
- Fungi / Mycobionta
  - Chytridiomycota [Part 1/1]
    - Blastocladiomycetes
    - Chytridiomycetes
    - Monoblepharidomycetes
    - Neocallimastigomycetes
  - Zygomycota [Part 1/1]
    - Entomophthoromycotina
    - Mortierellomycotina
    - Mucoromycotina
    - Kickxellomycotina
    - Zoopagomycotina
  - Glomeromycota [Part 1/1]
    - Glomeromycetes
  - Ascomycota [Part 1/2, 2016]
    - Taphrinomycotina
    - Saccharomycotina
    - Pezizomycotina
  - Basidiomycota [Part 1/3, 2018]
    - Pucciniomycotina
    - Ustilaginomycotina
    - Agaricomycotina
  - Entorrhizomycota [Part 1/3, 2018]
    - Entorrhizomycetes
- Heterokontobionta
  - Labyrinthulomycota [Part 1/1]
    - Labyrinthulomycetes
  - Oomycota [Part 1/1]
    - Hyphochytridiomycetes
    - Peronosporomycetes
  - Cryptophyta [Part 2/1]
    - Cryptophyceae
    - Goniomonadea
  - Dinophyta/Dinozoa (Dinoflagellata) [Part 2/1]
    - Perkinsea
    - Oxyrrhidophyceae
    - Ellobiophyceae
    - Syndiniophyceae
    - Noctiluciphyceae
    - Dinophyceae
  - Haptophyta [Part 2/1]
    - Pavlovophyceae
    - Coccolithophyceae
  - Heterokontophyta / Ochrophyta [Part 2/1]
    - Diatomeae, Bacillariophyceae s.l.
      - Coscinodiscophyceae
      - Mediophyceae
      - Fragilariophyceae
      - Bacillariophyceae
    - Other heterokontophytes
      - Bolidophyceae
      - Dictyochophyceae
      - Pelagophyceae
      - Pinguiophyceae
      - Eustigmatophyceae
      - Picophagea
      - Synchromophyceae
      - Chrysophyceae
      - Raphidophyceae
      - Chrysomerophyceae
      - Aurearenophyceae
      - Phaeothamniophyceae
      - Xanthophyceae
      - Schizocladiophyceae
      - Phaeophyceae
- Glaucobionta [Part 2/1]
  - Glaucophyta
- Rhodobionta [Part 2/2, 2017]
  - Rhodophyta
    - Cyanidiophytina
    - Rhodophytina
- Organisation type "Green Algae"
  - Chlorarachniophyta / Cercozoa [Part 2/1, 2015]
    - Chlorarachniophyceae
  - Euglenophyta/Euglenozoa [Part 2/1]
    - Euglenophyceae
  - Chlorobionta ("Viridiplantae")
    - Chlorophyta [Part 2/1]
      - Nephroselmidophyceae
      - Mamiellophyceae
      - Prasinophyceae
      - Pedinophyceae
      - Chlorodendrophyceae
      - Trebouxiophyceae
      - Chlorophyceae
      - Ulvophyceae
      - Chlorophyta incertae sedis
      - Palmophyllales
    - Streptophyta
      - Mesostigmatophyceae [Part 2/1]
      - Chlorokybophyceae [Part 2/1]
      - Klebsormidiophyceae [Part 2/1]
      - Coleochaetophyceae [Part 2/1]
      - Zygnematophyceae [Part 2/1]
      - Charophyceae [Part 2/1]
      - Embryobionta
        - "Bryophytes" [Part 3, 2009]
          - Marchantiophyta (Hepaticae)
          - Bryophyta (Musci)
          - Anthocerotophyta
        - Polysporangiomorpha [Part 3]
          - "Protracheophytes" (Horneophytopsida)
          - Tracheophyta
            - Rhyniophytina [Part 3]
            - Lycophytina [Part 3]
            - Euphyllophytina [Part 3]
              - “Trimerophytina”
              - Moniliformopses (Cladoxylopsida, Psilotopsida, Equisetopsida, Marattiopsida, Polypodiopsida)
              - Radiatopses (Progymnospermopsida)
            - Spermatophytina
              - Pinopsida (gymnosperms) [Part 4, 2015]
                - "Pteridospermatidae"
                - Cycadidae
                - Ginkgoidae
                - Gnetidae
                - Pinidae
              - Magnoliopsida (angiosperms)
                - Magnoliidae [Part 4, 2015]
                  - Amborellanae
                  - Nymphaeanae
                  - Austrobaileyanae
                  - Magnolianae: Chloranthales, Canellales, Piperales, Laurales, Magnoliales
                - Lilianae (monocotyledons)
                  - Acorales, Alismatales, Petrosaviales, Dioscoreales, Pandanales, Liliales, Asparagales [Part 4, 2015]
                  - Arecales, Commelinales, Poales, Zingiberales [Part 5/1, 2022]
                - Eudicotyledons [Part 5/1, 2022]
                  - Ceratophyllanae
                  - Rosidae (Eudicots)
                    - Ranunculanae
                    - Proteanae
                    - Trochodendranae
                    - Buxanae
                    - Myrothamnanae
                    - Rosanae
                    - Berberidopsidanae
                  - Rosidae (continued) [Part 5/2, to be published]
                    - Santalanae
                    - Caryophyllanae
                    - Asteranae

== Bibliography ==
=== Works by Engler ===
==== Syllabus editions 1892–1924 ====
- Engler, Adolf (1892). Syllabus der Vorlesungen über specielle und medicinisch-pharmaceutische Botanik. Eine Uebersicht über das gesammte Pflanzensystem mit Berücksichtigung der Medicinal- und Nutzpflanzen (1st ed.). Berlin: Gebrüder Borntraeger Verlag. p. 143.
- Engler, Adolf (1898) [1892]. Syllabus der Pflanzenfamilien: eine Übersicht über das gesamte Pflanzensystem mit Berücksichtigung der Medicinal- und Nutzpflanzen zum Gebrauch bei Vorlesungen und Studien ueber specielle und medicinisch-pharmaceutische Botanik (2nd ed.). Berlin: Gebrüder Borntraeger Verlag. pp. 214.
- Engler, Adolf (1903) [1892]. Syllabus der Pflanzenfamilien: eine Übersicht über das gesamte Pflanzensystem mit Berücksichtigung der Medicinal- und Nutzpflanzen nebst einer Übersicht über die Florenreiche und Florengebiete der Erde zum Gebrauch bei Vorlesungen und Studien über specielle und medicinisch-pharmaceutische Botanik (in German) (3rd ed.). Berlin: Gebrüder Borntraeger Verlag. p. 233.
  - Rendle, A.B. (1903). "Notices of Books: Syllabus der Pflanzenfamilien 3rd ed. 1903" (Review). Journal of Botany, British and Foreign. 41: 62–63.
- 1904: Engler, A. idem, 4th ed., Borntraeger, Berlin.
- 1907: Engler, A. idem, 5th ed., Gebrüder Borntraeger Verlag, Berlin, 247 p.
- 1909: Engler, A. idem, 6th ed., Gebrüder Borntraeger Verlag, Berlin, 254 p.
- 1912: Engler, A. & E. Gilg, Syllabus der Pflanzenfamilien: eine Übersicht über das gesamte Pflanzensystem mit besonderer Berücksichtigung der Medizinal- und Nutzpflanzen, nebst einer Übersicht über die Florenreiche und Florengebiete der Erde zum Gebrauch bei Vorlesungen und Studien über spezielle und medizinisch-pharmazeutische Botanik, 7th ed., Gebrüder Borntraeger Verlag, Berlin, 387 p.
- Engler, Adolf; Gilg, Ernst (1919) [1892]. Syllabus de Pflanzenfamilien, eine Übersicht über das gesamte Pflanzensystem mit besonderer Berücksichtigung der Medizinalund Nutzpflanzen nebst einer Ubersicht über die Florenreiche und Florengebiete der Erde zum Gebrauch bei Vorlesungen und Studien über spezielle und medizinisch-pharmazeutische Botanik (8th ed.). Berlin: Gebrüder Borntraeger Verlag. p. 395.
- 1924: Engler, A. & E. Gilg, Syllabus der Pflanzenfamilien: eine Übersicht über das ganze Pflanzensystem mit besonderer Berücksichtigung der Medizinal- und Naturpflanzen nebst einer Übersicht über die Florenreiche und Florengebiete der Erde zum Gebrauch bei Vorlesungen und Studien über spezielle und medizinisch-pharmazeutische Botanik , 9th ed., Gebrüder Borntraeger Verlag, Berlin, 420 p.
- 1924: Engler, A. & E. Gilg, idem, 10th ed., Gebrüder Borntraeger Verlag, Berlin.

==== Posthumous editions ====
- 1936: Diels, L. A. Engler's Syllabus der Pflanzenfamilien: eine Übersicht über das ganze Pflanzensystem mit besonderer Berücksichtigung der Medizinal- und Nutzpflanzen nebst einer Übersicht über die Florenreiche und Florengebiete der Erde zum Gebrauch bei Vorselungen und Studien über spezielle und medizinisch-pharmazeutische Botanik, 11th ed., Gebrüder Borntraeger Verlag, Berlin, 419 p.
- Melchior, Hans; Werdermann, E, eds. (1954–1964). A. Engler's Syllabus der Pflanzenfamilien: mit besonderer Berücksichtigung der Nutzpflanzen nebst einer Übersicht über die Florenreiche und Florengebiete der Erde. (2 vols.) (12th ed.). Berlin: Gebrüder Borntraeger Verlag.
  - Vol. I 367 pp.
  - Vol. II 666 pp.
- 1983: Gerloff, J. & K. Walther, idem, 13th ed., Gebrüder Borntraeger Verlag, Berlin (Only one of seven planned volumes was published - Bryophytina, Laubmoose)
  - In 2009, the edition was revived, with the publication of the first of five replanned volumes
  - Frey, Wolfgang, ed. (2012). A. Engler's Syllabus der Pflanzenfamilien Part 1/1: Blue-green Algae, Myxomycetes and Myxomycete-like organisms, Phytoparasitic protists, Heterotrophic Heterokontobionta and Fungi p.p. (13th ed.). Berlin: Borntraeger. ISBN 978-3-4430-1061-4.
  - Frey, Wolfgang, ed. (2016). A. Engler's Syllabus der Pflanzenfamilien Part 1/2: Ascomycota (13th ed.). Berlin: Borntraeger. ISBN 978-3-4430-1089-8.
  - Frey, Wolfgang, ed. (2015). A. Engler's Syllabus der Pflanzenfamilien Part 2/1: Photoautotrophic eukaryotic Algae (13th ed.). Berlin: Borntraeger. ISBN 978-3-4430-1083-6.
  - Frey, Wolfgang; Stech, Michael; Fischer, Eberhard, eds. (2009). A. Engler's Syllabus der Pflanzenfamilien Part 3: Bryophytes and seedless vascular plants (13th ed.). Berlin: Borntraeger. ISBN 978-3-4430-1063-8. Google Books
  - Frey, Wolfgang, ed. (2015). A. Engler's Syllabus der Pflanzenfamilien Part 4: Pinopsida (Gymnosperms), Magnoliopsida (Angiosperms) p.p. (13th ed.). Berlin: Borntraeger. ISBN 978-3-4430-1087-4.
  - Forthcoming parts:
    - Part 1/3: Basidiomycota
    - Part 2/2: Rhodobionta
    - Part 5: Seed Plants, Spermatophytes (2)

==== Other works by Engler ====
- Engler, Adolf (1886). Führer durch den Königlich botanischen Garten der Universität zu Breslau. J.U. Kerns Verlag (Max Müller).

=== Works about Engler ===
- Bhattacharyya, Bharati (2005). Systematic botany. Harrow: Alpha Science International Ltd. ISBN 978-1-8426-5251-0.
- Naik, V.N. (1984). Taxonomy of Angiosperms. New Delhi: Tata McGraw-Hill Education. ISBN 978-0-0745-1788-8.
- Stace, Clive A. (1989) [1980]. Plant taxonomy and biosystematics (2nd. ed.). Cambridge: Cambridge University Press. ISBN 978-0-5214-2785-2.
