= Die Natürlichen Pflanzenfamilien =

German textbook on plant systematics, initially published 1887–1915

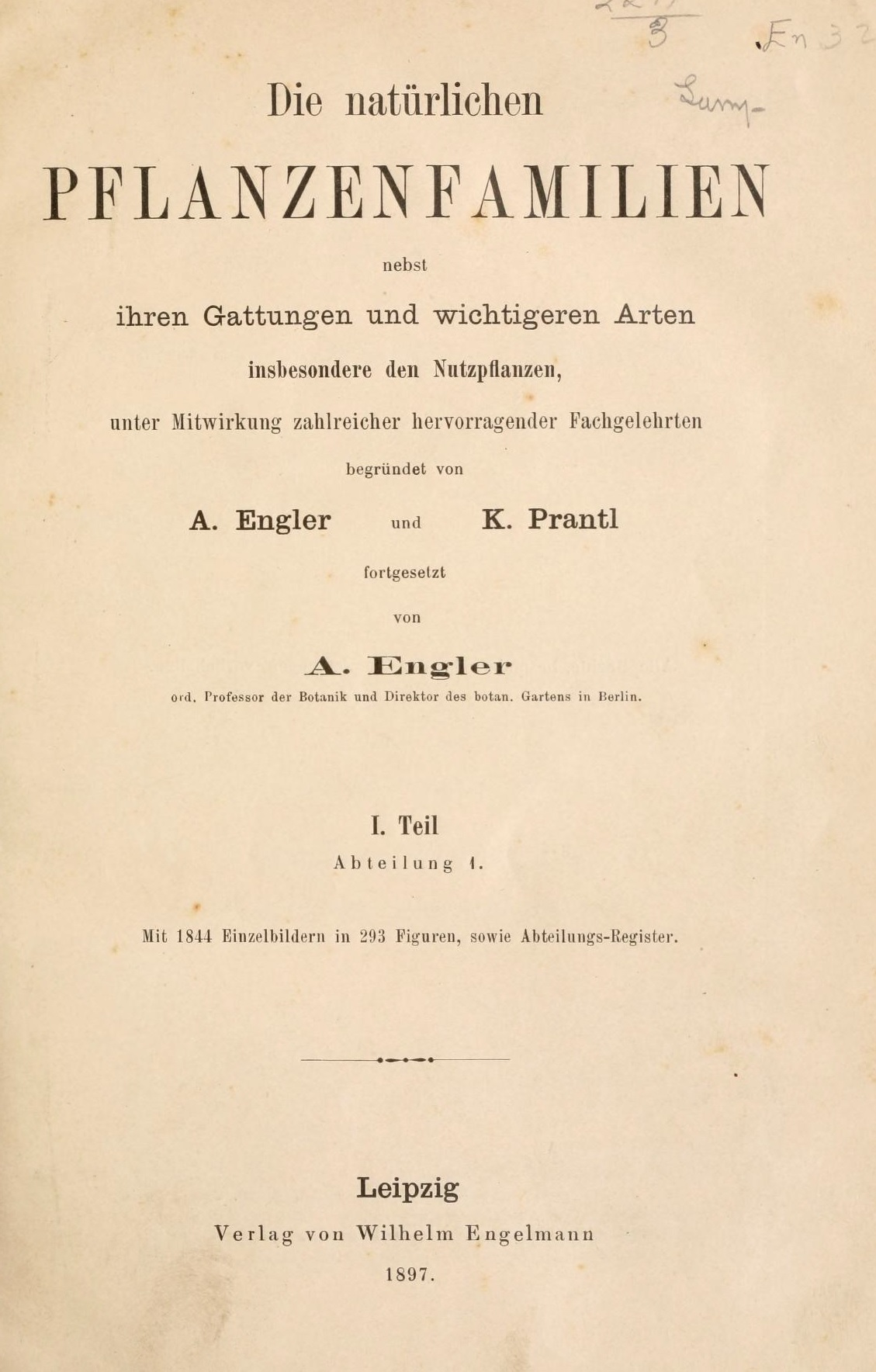
- Cover page of first part of first edition
- Author: Adolf Engler
- Language: German
- Subject: Botany
- Published: 1887–1915
- Publisher: W. Engelmann
- Publication place: Germany
- Media type: Print

Die Natürlichen Pflanzenfamilien is a botanical work in German language, first published in many volumes between 1887–1915 and written by Adolf Engler (1844–1930) and Karl Anton Prantl (1849–1893). It contained a complete revision of plant families down to generic level and often even further. As such it forms part of the Engler system of plant taxonomy.

The first edition of Die Natürlichen Pflanzenfamilien appeared in 23 volumes. An incomplete second edition was issued in 28 parts (1924–1980), although Engler had died in 1930. It is still considered one of the few true World Floras.

Engler's starting point was that of Eichler who had been the first to use phylogenetic principles, and reflected the new post-Darwinian perspective, although Engler himself did not think that his was. His modified Eichler schema first appeared in 1886 in his Guide to Breslau Botanic Garden (of which he was the director).

== First edition (1887–1915) ==
The complete 23 volume work was published in four parts (Teil(e)), together with supplements and indices. Each part was further divided in Abteilung(en) (sections).
The volumes are arranged as follows:

- Teil 1:
  - Abt. 1, 1897; Myxothallophyta (Abt. I): Myxomycetes. Euthallophyta (Abt. II): Fungi (Eumycetes): Phycomycetes & Ascomycetes.
  - Abt. 1*, 1907; Euthallophyta (Abt. II): Eumycetes: Lichenes.
  - Abt. 1**, 1900; Euthallophyta (Abt. II): Eumycetes: Basidiomycetes & Fungi imperfecti.
  - Abt. 1a, 1900; Euthallophyta (Abt. II): Schyzophyta & Flagellata.
  - Abt. 1b, 1896; Euthallophyta (Abt. II): Peridiniales (Gymnodiniaceae, Prorocentraceae, Peridiniaceae) and Bacillariaceae.
  - Abt. 2, 1897; Euthallophyta (Abt. II): Euphyceae.
  - Abt. 3, Hälfte 1, 1909; Embryophyta zoidiogama (Abt. III): Hepaticae & Musci.
  - Abt. 3, Hälfte 2, 1909; Embryophyta zoidiogama (Abt. III): Musci.
  - Abt. 4 1902; Embryophyta asiphonogama (Abt. III): Pteridophyta.
- Teil 2:
  - Abt. 1, 1889; Embroyophyta siphonogama (Abt. IV): Gymnospermae & Angiospermae (Monocotyledoneae: Thyphaceae etc.).
  - Abt. 2, 1887; Monocotyledoneae: Gramineae & Cyperaceae.
  - Abt. 3, 1889; Monocotyledoneae: Palmae etc.
  - Abt. 4, 1888; Monocotyledoneae: Flagellariaceae etc.
  - Abt. 5, 1888; Monocotyledoneae: Juncaceae etc.
  - Abt. 6, 1889; Monocotyledoneae: Musaceae etc.
- Teil 3:
  - Abt. 1, 1889; Dicotyledonae: Saururaceae etc.
  - Abt. 1a, 1893; Dicotyledoneae: Polygonaceae etc.
  - Abt. 1b, 1889; Dicotyledoneae: Phytolaccaceae etc.
  - Abt. 2, 1891; Dicotyledoneae: Nymphaeaceae etc.
  - Abt. 2a, 1891; Dicotyledoneae: Podostomataceae etc.
  - Abt. 3. 1894; Dicotyledoneae: Rosaceae etc.
  - Abt. 4, 1896; Dicotyledoneae: Geraniaceae etc.
  - Abt. 5, 1896; Dicotyledoneae: Euphorbiaceae etc.
  - Abt. 6, 1895; Dicotyledoneae: Elaeocarpaceae etc.
  - Abt. 6a, 1894; Dicotyledoneae: Flacourtiaceae etc. (Index 6–8 p. 272)
  - Abt. 7, 1893; Dicotyledoneae: Lythraceae etc.
  - Abt. 8, 1894; Dicotyledoneae: Araliaceae etc.
- Teil 4:
  - Abt. 1, 1897; Dicotyledoneae: Clethraceae etc.
  - Abt. 2, 1895; Dicotyledoneae: Oleaceae etc.
  - Abt. 3a, 1897; Dicotyledoneae: Convolvulaceae etc.
  - Abt. 3b, 1895; Dicotyledoneae: Nolanaceae etc.
  - Abt. 4, 1891; Dicotyledoneae: Rubiaceae etc.
  - Abt. 5, 1894; Dicotyledoneae: Cucurbitaceae etc.
- Nachträge (supplements)
  - Teil 1, Abt. 2, Nachträge, 1911
  - Teilen 2–4, Nachträge 1, 1897
  - Teilen 2–4, Nachträge 2, 1900
  - Teilen 2–4, Nachträge 3 (or Ergänzungshefte 2), 1908
  - Teilen 2–4, Nachträge 4 (or Ergänzungshefte 3), 1915
- Gesamtregister (index)
  - Teil 1, Gesamtregister, 1909.
  - Teil 2–4, Gesamtregister, 1899.

=== Synopsis ===
Engler's Botanical Ranks
German	Latin	English
Abteilung	divisio	Division
Unterabteilung	subdivisio	Subdivision
Klasse	classis	Class
Reihe	ordo	Order
Unterreihe	subordo	Suborder
Fam.	familia	Family
Unterfam.	subfamilia	Subfamily
Gruppe (§)	tribus	Tribe
Gattung	genus	Genus
Art	species	Species

The major groupings (Abteilung, Unterabteilung), with selected lower rankings are shown here with [Volume number] and page number. N (Nachträge = supplement).

- Abteilung Myxothallophyta (Myxomycetes) [I (1)] 1897
- Abteilung Euthallophyta
  - Unterabteilung Fungi (Eumycetes)
  - Unterabteilung Schizophyta [I (1a)] 1900
    - Klasse Schizomycetes (Bacteria)
    - Klasse Schizophyceae (Myxophycaceae) p. 45
    - Klasse Flagellata p. 93
      - Unterklasse Peridiniales [I (1b)] p. 1
      - Unterklasse Bacillariales (Diatomeae) p. 34
        - Fam. Bacillariaceae
  - Unterabteilung Euphyceae (Algae) [I (2)]
    - Klasse Conjugatae
    - Klasse Chlorophyceae
    - Klasse Characeae
    - Klasse Phaeophyceae (Fucoideae)
    - Klasse Dictyotales
    - Klasse Rhodophyceae
- Abteilung Embryophyta Zoidiogama (Archegoniatae) (later Embryophyta Asiphonogama) [I (3)] 1909
  - Unterabteilung Bryophyta (Muscinei)
    - Klasse Hepaticae p. 1
    - Klasse Musci p. 142
  - Unterabteilung Pteridophyta [I (4)] 1902
- Abteilung Embryophyta Siphonogama [II (1)] 1889
  - Unterabteilung Gymnospermae [II(1)] p. 6
  - Unterabteilung Angiospermae [II (1)] p. 128
    - Klasse Monocotyledoneae p. 183 [II–III]
      - Fam. Gramineae [II (2)] p. 1
      - Fam. Palmae [II(3)] p. 1
      - Fam. Flagellariaceae [II(4)] p. 1
      - Fam. Juncaceae II(5) p. 1 1888
      - Fam. Liliaceae pp. 10–91 12 subfamilies
        - Melanthioideae
        - Herrerioideae
        - Asphodeloideae
        - Allioideae
        - Lilioideae p. 60 2 tribes
          - Tulipeae p. 60
          - Scilleae p. 63
        - Dracaenoideae
        - Asparagoideae
        - Ophiopogonoideae
      - Fam. Haemodoraceae p. 92
      - Fam. Amaryllidaceae Pax [II(5)] pp. 97–124 4 subfamilies
        - Amaryllidoideae p. 103
        - Agavoideae p. 115
        - Hypoxidoideae p. 119
        - Campynematoideae p. 124
      - Fam. Musaceae [II (6)] p. 1 1889
      - Fam. Saururaceae [III (1)] p. 1 1889
    - Klasse Dicotyledoneae [IV] 1897
      - Unterklasse Archichlamydeae [III] (6) p. 1
        - Fam. Elaeocarpaceae p. 1
        - ...
        - Fam. Violaceae p. 322
        - Fam. Flacourtiaceae (6a) p. 1
        - ...
        - Fam. Elaeagnaceae p. 246
- Index to Teil I (6a)
- Index to Teil 2–IV
- Index to II(5)

== Second edition 1924– ==
- Bd. 1b: Schizophyta. Klasse Schizophyceae. 1942 (reprint 1959)
- Bd. 2: Peridineae (Dinoflagellatae) - Diatomeae (Bacillariophyta) - Myxomycetes. 1928
  - E. Lindemann, Peridineae - G. Karsten, Bacillariophyta (Diatomeae) - E. Jahn, Myxomycetes
- Bd. 3: Chlorophyceae (nebst Conjugatae, Heterocontae und Charophyta). 1927 (reprint 1959)
- Bd. 5a: I: Eumycetes: Allgemeiner Teil: Bau, Entwicklung und Lebensweise der Pilze. 1943 (reprint 1959)
- Bd. 5b. 8: Eumycecetes (Fungi) – Klasse: Ascomycetes, Reihe Euascales, Unterreihe VIII: Tuberineae. 1938
- Bd. 6: Eumycetes (Fungi): Basidiomycetes. 1928
  - P. Dietel, 1. Unterklasse: Hemibasidii - S. Killermann, 2. Unterklasse: Eubasidii, Reihe Hymenomyceteae
- Bd. 7a: Eumycetes (Fungi) – Klasse: Basidiomycetes. 1933 (reprint 1959)
- Bd. 8: Lichenes (Flechten). 1926
  - M. Fünfstück, A. Allgemeiner Teil - A. Zahlbruckner, B. Spezieller Teil: Ascolichenes (Schlauchflechten); Hymenolichenes (Basidiomycetenflechten)
- Bd. 10-11: Embryophyta zoidiogama (Archegoniatae): Musci (Laubmoose), Hälfte 1–2. 1924-
  - Bd. 10: Musci (Laubmoose), 1. Hälfte. 1924 (reprint 1960)
  - W. Ruhland, Musci, Allgemeiner Teil - W. Ruhland, I. Unterklasse Sphagnales: Allgemeine Verhältnisse - H. Paul, Sphagnaceae (Torfmoose) - W. Ruhland, II. Unterklasse Andreaeales: Allgemeine Verhältnisse - V. F. Brotherus, Andreaeaceae - W. Ruhland, III. Unterklasse Bryales: I. Allgemeine Verhältnisse - V. F. Brotherus, II. Spezieller Teil - 1. Reihengruppe Eubryinales; 1. Reihe Fissidentales, 2. Reihe Dicranales, 3. Reihe Pottiales, 4. Reihe Grimmiales, 5. Reihe Funariales, 6. Reihe Schistostegiales, 7. Reihe Tetraphidales, 8. Reihe Eubryales
  - Bd. 11: Musci (Laubmoose), 2. Hälfte. 1925 (reprint 1960)
- Bd. 13: Embryophyta siphonogama: Gymnospermae. 1926 (reprint 1960)
  - W. Gothan, Cycadofilices - R. Pilger, Cycadales - R. Kräusel, Fossile Cycadaceae, Bennettitales - R. Pilger, Ginkgoales - R. Kräusel, Fossile Ginkgoaceae, Cordaitales - R. Pilger, Coniferae - A. Engler, Geographische Verbreitung der Coniferae - R. Kräusel, Fossile Coniferae - F. Markgraf, Gnetales
- Bd. 14a-20d: Embryophyta siphonogama: Angiospermae. 1926-1959
  - Bd. 14a: Angiospermae: Kurze Erläuterung der Blüten- und Fortpflanzungsverhältnisse. 1926
  - Bd. 14d: Angiospermae: Reihe Graminales (Glumiflorae). Gramineae II. 1956
  - Unterfamilien: Micrairoideae, Eragrostoideae, Oryzoideae, Olyroideae
  - Bd. 14e: Gramineae III. 1956–1960
  - Bd. 15a: Angiospermae: Reihen Farinosae, Liliiflorae, Scitamineae. 1930
  - A. Engler, Flagellariaceae, Cyanastraceae - C. Gilg-Benedict, Restionaceae, Centrolepidaceae - R. Pilger, Mayacaceae, Thurniaceae, Rapateaceae, Philydraceae - G. O. A. Malme, Xyridaceae - W. Ruhland, Eriocaulaceae - H. Harms, Bromeliaceae - G. Brückner, Commelinaceae - O. Schwartz, Pontederiaceae - F. Vierhapper, Juncaceae - K. Krause, Stemonaceae, Liliaceae - F. Pax, Haemodoraceae, Amaryllidaceae - F. Pax / K. Hoffmann, Velloziaceae, Taccaceae - R. Knuth, Dioscoreaceae - L. Diels, Iridaceae - H. Winkler, Musaceae, Cannaceae - T. Loesener, Zingiberaceae, Marantaceae
  - Bd. 16b: Angiospermae: Reihen Santalales, Aristolochiales, Balanophorales. 1935 (reprint 1960)
  - Bd. 16c: Angiospermae: Reihe Centrospermae. 1934 (reprint 1960)
  - H. Schinz, Amaranthaceae - A. Heimerl, Nyctaginaceae - A. Heimerl, Phytolaccaceae - A. Heimerl, Gyrostemonaceae - A. Heimerl, Achatocarpaceae - F. Pax / K. Hoffmann, Aizoaceae - F. Pax / K. Hoffmann, Portulacaceae - E. Ulbrich, Basellaceae - F. Pax / K. Hoffmann, Dysphaniaceae; Caryophyllaceae - J. Mattfeld, Nachtrag zu den Caryophyllaceae - E. Ulbrich, Thelygonaceae - E. Ulbrich, Chenopodiaceae
  - Bd. 17a: II: Angiospermae: Reihe Magnoliales. (2. Teil). 1959
  - Bd. 17a: IV: Angiospermae: Reihen Rhoeadales und Sarraceniales: Ordnung Ranunculales, Fam. Ranunculaceae 1995
  - Bd. 17b: Angiospermae: Reihen Rhoeadales und Sarraceniales: Reihen Rhoeadales und Sarraceniales. 1936 (reprint 1960)
  - F. Fedde, Papaveraceae - F. Pax / K. Hoffmann, Capparidaceae, Tovariaceae - O. E. Schulz, Cruciferae - F. Bolle, Resedaceae - F. Pax, Moringaceae, Bretschneideraceae - J. C. T. Uphof, Sarraceniaceae - H. Harms, Nepenthaceae - L. Diels, Droseraceae
  - Bd. 18a: Angiospermae: Reihe Podostemonales – Reihe Rosales, Unterreihe Saxifragineae. 1930
  - A. Engler, Podostemonaceae - L. Diels, Cephalotaceae - A. Engler, Saxifragaceae, Brunelliaceae, Cunoniaceae - F. Niedenzu / A. Engler, Myrothamnaceae - E. Pritzel, Pittosporaceae - L. Diels, Byblidaceae - F. Niedenzu / H. Harms, Bruniaceae - H. Harms, Hamamelidaceae - L. Diels, Roridulaceae - H. Harms, Eucommiaceae - A. Berger, Crassulaceae
  - Bd. 19a: Angiospermae: Reihe Pandales – Reihe Geraniales, Unterreihe Geraniineae (erster Teil). 1931
  - Bd. 19b: I: Angiospermae, Reihe Geraniales, Unterreihe Geraniineae (2. Teil) 1960
  - Bd. 19c: Angiospermae: Reihe Geraniales, Unterreihen Dichapetalineae, Tricoccae, Callitrichineae. 1931
  - Bd. 20b: Angiospermae: Reihe Sapindales, Unterreihen Celastrineae und Icacinineae. 1942 (reprint 1960)
  - Bd. 20d: Angiospermae, Reihe Rhamnales. 1953
- Bd. 21: Embryophyta siphonogama: Angiospermae, Dicotyledoneae, Archichlamydeae. 1925, reprint 1960
  - Parietales und Opuntiales.
  - E. Gilg / E. Werdermann, Dilleniaceae - E. Gilg / E. Werdermann, Actinidiaceae - E. Gilg, Eucryphiaceae - E. Gilg, Ochnaceae - R. Pilger, Caryocaraceae - E. Gilg / E. Werdermann, Marcgraviaceae - A. Engler, Quiinaceae - H. Melchior, Theaceae - A. Engler, Guttiferae - E. Gilg, Dipterocarpaceae - F. Niedenzu, Elatinaceae - F. Niedenzu, Frankeniaceae - F. Niedenzu, Tamaricaceae - E. Janchen, Cistaceae - R. Pilger, Bixaceae - F. Pilger, Cochlospermaceae - E. Gilg, Canellaceae - H. Melchior, Violaceae - W. Becker, Viola - E. Gilg, Flacourtiaceae - E. Gilg, Stachyuraceae - E. Gilg, Turneraceae - H. Harms, Malesherbiaceae - H. Harms, Passifloraceae - H. Harms, Achariaceae - H. Harms, Caricaceae - E. Gilg, Loasaceae - E. Gilg, Datiscaceae - E. Irmscher, Begoniaceae - E. Gilg, Ancistrocladaceae - F. Vaupel, Cactaceae
- Bd. 28b: I: Angiospermae: Ordnung Gentianales, Fam. Loganiaceae 1980

For comparative indices between the first and second editions (Parts 1–24), see Morley 1984.

== Bibliography ==
=== Works by Engler ===
- Engler, Adolf (1886). Führer durch den Königlich botanischen Garten der Universität zu Breslau. J.U. Kerns Verlag (Max Müller).
- Engler, Adolf; Prantl, Karl, eds. (1887–1915). Die Natürlichen Pflanzenfamilien nebst ihren Gattungen und wichtigeren Arten, insbesondere den Nutzpflanzen, unter Mitwirkung zahlreicher hervorragender Fachgelehrten (in German). Leipzig: W. Engelmann. (33 parts (Abteilungen) in 23 volumes)
- Engler, Adolf; Prantl, Karl, eds. (1924) [1887–1915]. Die natürlichen Pflanzenfamilien nebst ihren Gattungen und wichtigeren Arten, insbesondere den Nutzpflanzen, unter Mitwirkung zahlreicher hervorragender Fachgelehrten (in German) (2nd ed.). Berlin: Duncker & Humblot. (21 parts (Abteilungen))

=== Other ===
- Bhattacharyya, Bharati (2005). Systematic botany. Harrow: Alpha Science International Ltd. ISBN 9781842652510.
- Frodin, David G. (2001) [1984]. Guide to Standard Floras of the World: An Annotated, Geographically Arranged Systematic Bibliography of the Principal Floras, Enumerations, Checklists and Chorological Atlases of Different Areas (2nd ed.). Cambridge University Press. ISBN 9781139428651.
- Morley, Thomas (1984). "An Index to the Families in Engler and Prantl's "Die Naturlichen Pflanzenfamilien'". Annals of the Missouri Botanical Garden. 71 (1): 210–228. doi:10.2307/2399064. JSTOR 2399064.
- Stace, Clive A. (1989) [1980]. Plant taxonomy and biosystematics (2nd. ed.). Cambridge: Cambridge University Press. ISBN 9780521427852.
