= Engler system =

System of plant taxonomy devised by Adolf Engler

One of the prime systems of plant taxonomy, the Engler system was devised by Adolf Engler (1844–1930), and is featured in two major taxonomic texts he authored or co-authored. His influence is reflected in the use of the terms "Engler School" and "Engler Era". Engler's starting point was that of Eichler who had been the first to use phylogenetic principles, although Engler himself did not think that he was.

== Engler's works ==
His modified Eichler schema first appeared in 1886 in his Guide to Breslau Botanic Garden (of which he was the director) and was expanded in his Syllabus der Pflanzenfamilien in 1892. This reflected the new post-Darwinian perspective. Engler's Syllabus first appeared in 1892 with the title Syllabus der Vorlesungen über specielle und medicinisch-pharmaceutische Botanik. Many subsequent editions have appeared since, and it was continued after Engler's death in 1930. The most recent edition was the 13th in 2009.

The other major work was Die Natürlichen Pflanzenfamilien (1887-1915) written with Karl Anton Prantl in 23 volumes. An incomplete second edition was issued in 28 parts (1924-1980). Die Natürlichen Pflanzenfamilien consisted of a complete revision of plant families down to generic level and often even further. Die Natürlichen Pflanzenfamilien is still considered one of the few true World Floras. Finally there was the also incomplete Das Pflanzenreich (1900–1968), a multi-authored work which attempted to provide a modern version of Linnaeus' Species Plantarum (1753). The Engler system rapidly became the most widely used system in the world.

References to the Engler system may imply an edition of the Syllabus der Pflanzenfamilien or Die Natürlichen Pflanzenfamilien. The different approaches between the two works and the different editions has resulted in inconsistencies in the descriptions of the system. A number of references to the Engler system actually refer to later revisions ('modified Engler system') undertaken by Melchior and colleagues, the 12th edition of the Syllabus (1964). Many of the world's herbaria have been organised on the Engler system, particularly in North America and in Europe other than Britain. The Engler system is also reflected in his multi-volume collaborative work, begun in 1900, Das Pflanzenreich: regni vegetablilis conspectus.

Plants were considered to form a number of divisions (Abteilung), the number of which continually changed but initially (1886) was four and in 1919 was thirteen. Many of these referred to lower life forms such as bacteria and algae that would not necessarily be considered as plants today. Initially higher plants (Embryophyta or terrestrial plants) were considered in two divisions, Embryophyta Asiphonogama (bryophytes, pteridophytes) and Embryophyta Siphonogama (Spermatophytes: gymnosperms, angiosperms), but were later subdivided. Embryophyta Siphonogama replaced the older term Phanerogamae, and the classes were further divided into groups of families, called orders. Engler followed Eichler's phylogeny, placing the monocotyledons before the dicotyledons, and within the latter the Archichlamydeae before the Metachlamydeae. While the groupings were largely based on those of Bentham and Hooker, the ordering was very much based on the concept of the primitive plant and those that were derived from these.

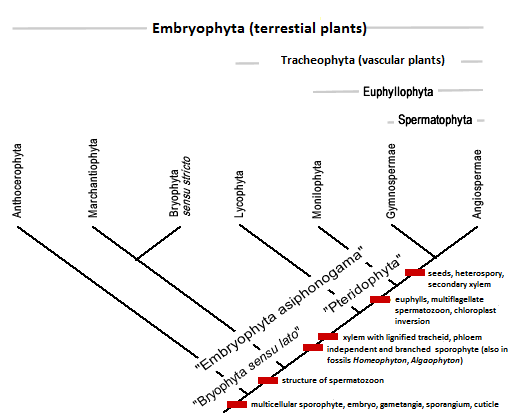

Engler's Botanical Ranks
German	Latin	English
Abteilung	divisio	Division
Unterabteilung	subdivisio	Subdivision
Klasse	classis	Class
Reihe	ordo	Order
Unterreihe	subordo	Suborder
Fam.	familia	Family
Unterfam.	subfamilia	Subfamily
Gruppe (§)	tribus	Tribe
Gattung	genus	Genus
Art	species	Species

== Führer durch den Königlich botanischen Garten (Engler 1886) ==
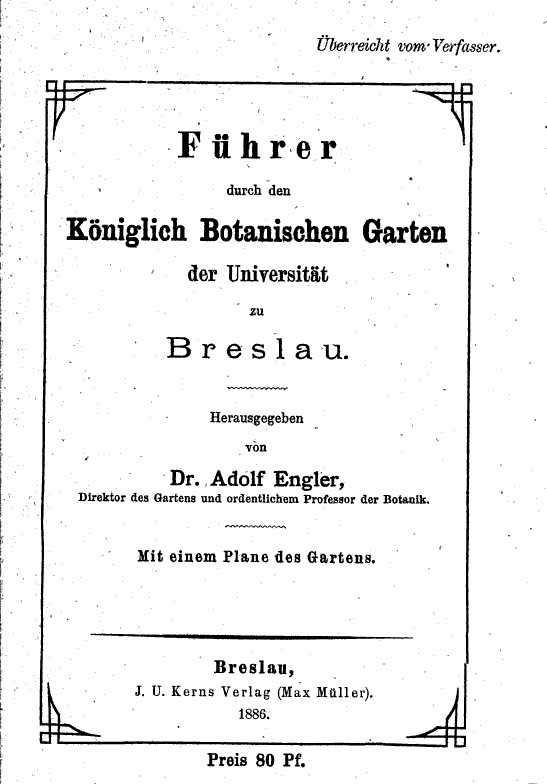
Front cover: Führer durch den Königlich botanischen Garten, 1886

Synopsis

- Division Mycetozoa (Myxomycetes)
- Division Thallophyta
  - Subdivision Schizophyta
  - Subdivision Algae
    - Class Bacilleriaceae (Diatomaceae)
    - Class Chlorophyceae
    - Class Phaeophyceae
    - Class Rhodophyceae (Florideae)
  - Subdivision Fungi
    - Class Phycomycetes
    - Class Ustilagineae
    - Class Ascomycetes (Lichenes)
  - Subdivision Characeae
- Division Zoidogamae (Archegoniatae)
  - Subdivision Bryophyta
    - Class Hepaticae
    - Class Musci frondosi
  - Subdivision Pteridophyta
    - Class Filicinae (2 orders) p. 11
    - Class Equisetinae
    - Class Lycopodinae
- Division Siphonogamae (Phanerogamae, Anthophyta)
  - Subdivision Gymnospermae (Archispermae)
    - Class Cycadinae
    - Class Coniferae
    - Class Gnetales
  - Subdivision Angiospermae (Metaspermae)
    - Class Monocotyledoneae (10 orders) p. 18
    - Class Dicotyledoneae
      - Subclass Archichlamydeae (Choripetalae, Apetalae) (25 orders) p. 30
      - Subclass Sympetalae (10 orders) p. 57

=== Division Zoidogamae (Archegoniatae) ===
- Subdivision Bryophyta
  - Class Hepaticae
  - Class Musci frondosi
- Subdivision Pteridophyta
  - Class Filicinae (2 orders)
    - Order Filices p. 11
    - Order Hydropterides p. 13
  - Class Equisetinae
  - Class Lycopodinae

=== Division Siphonogamae (Phanerogamae, Anthophyta) ===
==== Subdivision Gymnospermae (Archispermae) ====
- Class Cycadinae
- Class Coniferae
- Class Gnetales

==== Subdivision Angiospermae (Metaspermae) ====
- Class Monocotyledoneae (10 orders) p. 18

===== Class Monocotyledoneae =====
- Order Pandanales (3 families) p. 18
- Order Helobiae (Fluviales) (9 families) p. 18
- Order Glumiflorae (2 families) p. 18
  - Family Gramineae
  - Family Cyperaceae p. 21
- Order Principes (1 family) p. 21
- Order Synanthae (1 family) p. 22
- Order Spathiflorae (2 families) p. 22
- Order Farinosae (11 families) p. 23
- Order Liliiflorae (Solido-albuminatae) (8 families) p. 23
  - Family Juncaceae p. 23
  - Family Liliaceae (10 subfamilies) p. 23
    - Subfamily Melanthioideae p. 24
    - Subfamily Herrerioideae
    - Subfamily Asphodeloideae
    - Subfamily Allioideae p. 25
    - Subfamily Liliodeae p. 25
    - Subfamily Dracaenoideae
    - Subfamily Asparagoideae p. 26
    - Subfamily Ophiopogonoideae
    - Subfamily Luzuriagoideae
    - Subfamily Smilacoideae p. 26
  - Family Haemodoraceae
  - Family Amaryllidaceae (3 subfalies) p. 26
    - Subfamily Amaryllidoideae p. 26
    - Subfamily Agavoideae p. 26
    - Subfamily Hypoxidoideae
  - Family Velloziaceae p. 27
  - Family Taccaceae
  - Family Dioscoreaceae
  - Family Iridaceae (3 subfamilies) p. 27
    - Subfamily Crocoideae
    - Subfamily Iridoideae
    - Subfamily Ixioideae
- Order Scitamineae p. 28
- Order Microspermae

===== Class Dicotyledoneae =====
- Subclass Archichlamydeae (Choripetalae, Apetalae) (25 orders) p. 30
- Subclass Sympetalae (10 orders) p. 57

== Die Natürlichen Pflanzenfamilien (Engler and Prantl 1887–1915) ==
Synopsis of first edition

- Myxothallophyta (Myxomycetes) [I (1)] 1897
- Euthallophyta
- Embryophyta Zoidiogama (Archegoniatae) (later Embryophyta Asiphonogama) [I (3)] 1909
- Embryophyta Siphonogama [II (1)] 1889

== Syllabus der Pflanzenfamilien (Engler ed. 1892–) ==
Synopsis of first edition

- Myxothallophyta
- Euthallophyta
- Embryophyta Zoidiogama (Archegoniatae)
- Embryophyta Siphonogama (Phanerogamae)
  - Gymnospermae
  - Angiospermae

== Das Pflanzerreich (Engler ed. 1900–) ==
In the foreword included in the first part of this monumental work, Engler explained the need for a more detailed monograph than in Pflanzenfamilien.

== Bibliography ==
=== Works by Engler ===
- Engler, Adolf (1886). Führer durch den Königlich botanischen Garten der Universität zu Breslau (in German). J.U. Kerns Verlag (Max Müller).
- Engler, Adolf; Prantl, Karl, eds. (1887–1915). Die Natürlichen Pflanzenfamilien nebst ihren Gattungen und wichtigeren Arten, insbesondere den Nutzpflanzen, unter Mitwirkung zahlreicher hervorragender Fachgelehrten (in German). Vol. 33 parts (Abteilungen) in 23 volumes. Leipzig: W. Engelmann. (At BHL, also Google Books, III (6–8))
- Engler, Adolf (1892). Syllabus der Vorlesungen über specielle und medicinisch-pharmaceutische Botanik. Eine Uebersicht über das gesammte Pflanzensystem mit Berücksichtigung der Medicinal-und Nutzpflanzen (in German) (1st ed.). Berlin: Gebrüder Borntraeger Verlag. p. 143.
  - Frey, Wolfgang; Stech, Michael; Fischer, Eberhard, eds. (2009). A. Engler's Syllabus der Pflanzenfamilien Part 3: Bryophytes and seedless vascular plants (13th ed.). Berlin: Borntraeger. ISBN 978-3-443-01063-8. Google Books
- Engler, Adolf, ed. (1900–1968). Das Pflanzenreich: regni vegetablilis conspectus (in German). Leipzig: W. Engelmann.

=== Works about Engler ===
- Davis, Mervyn T. (August 1957). "A guide and an analysis of Engler's "Das Pflanzenreich"". Taxon. 6 (6): 161–182. Bibcode:1957Taxon...6..161D. doi:10.2307/1217029. JSTOR 1217029.
- Frodin, David G. (2001) [1984]. Guide to Standard Floras of the World: An Annotated, Geographically Arranged Systematic Bibliography of the Principal Floras, Enumerations, Checklists and Chorological Atlases of Different Areas (2nd ed.). Cambridge University Press. ISBN 9781139428651.
- Morley, Thomas (1984). "An Index to the Families in Engler and Prantl's "Die Naturlichen Pflanzenfamilien'". Annals of the Missouri Botanical Garden. 71 (1): 210–228. doi:10.2307/2399064. JSTOR 2399064.
- Stace, Clive A. (1989) [1980]. Plant taxonomy and biosystematics (2nd. ed.). Cambridge: Cambridge University Press. ISBN 9780521427852.
- Carter, Humphrey G. (1913). Genera of British plants arranged according to Engler's Syllabus der pflanzenfamilien (Seventh edition 1912). Cambridge University Press.
- Bhattacharyya, Bharati (2005). Systematic botany. Harrow: Alpha Science International Ltd. ISBN 9781842652510.
- Naik, V.N. (1984). Taxonomy of Angiosperms. New Delhi: Tata McGraw-Hill Education. ISBN 9780074517888.
- Stuessy, Tod F. (2009). Plant taxonomy: the systematic evaluation of comparative data (2nd ed.). New York: Columbia University Press. ISBN 9780231518642.
- Walters, Dirk R.; Keil, David J. (1996) [1975]. Vascular plant taxonomy (4th ed.). Dubuque, Iowa: Kendall/Hunt Pub. Co. ISBN 9780787221089.
