= Melchior system =

Taxonomic system for flowering plants

The Melchior system, "a reference in all taxonomic courses", is a classification system detailing the taxonomic system of the Angiospermae according to A. Engler's Syllabus der Pflanzenfamilien (1964), also known as "modified or updated" Engler system.

The collaborators in orders (and some families) were the following:

- Hans Melchior in Casuarinales, Juglandales, Balanopales, Leitneriales, Salicales, Fagales, Urticales, Didiereaceae, Piperales, Aristolochiales, Guttiferales, Sarraceniales, Papaverales, Hydrostachyales, Podostemonales, Julianiales, Violales, Cucurbitales, Myrtiflorae, Umbelliflorae, Primulales, Tubiflorae, Plantaginales, Liliiflorae p. p., Spathiflorae and Microspermae.
- G. Buchheim in Proteales, Cactales, Magnoliales and Ranunculales.
- W. Schultze-Motel in Santalales, Balanophorales, Medusandrales, Rhamnales, Malvales, Diapensiales, Ericales and Cyperales.
- Th. Eckardt in Polygonales, Centrospermae, Batales, Plumbaginales, Helobiae, Triuridales and Pandanales.
- G. K. Schultze-Menz in Rosales.
- H. Scholz in Geraniales, Rutales, Sapindales and Celastrales.
- G. Wagenitz in Thymelaeales, Ebenales, Oleales, Gentianales, Dipsacales and Campanulales.
- U. Hamann in Cyanastraceae, Pontederiaceae, Philydraceae, Juncales, Bromeliales and Commelinales.
- E. Potztal in Graminales, Principes, Synanthae and Scitamineae.

== subdivisio Angiospermae ==
=== classis Monocotyledoneae ===
==== ordo Helobiae ====
subordo Alismatineae

- Alismataceae
- Butomaceae

subordo Hydrocharitineae

- Hydrocharitaceae

subordo Scheuchzeriineae

- Scheuchzeriaceae

subordo Potamogetonineae

- Aponogetonaceae
- Juncaginaceae
- Potamogetonaceae
- Najadaceae
- Zannichelliaceae

==== ordo Triuridales ====
- Triuridaceae

==== ordo Liliiflorae ====
subordo Liliineae

- Liliaceae
- Xanthorrhoeaceae
- Stemonaceae
- Agavaceae
- Haemodoraceae
- Cyanastraceae
- Amaryllidaceae
- Hypoxidaceae
- Velloziaceae
- Taccaceae
- Dioscoreaceae

subordo Pontederiineae

- Pontederiaceae

subordo Iridineae

- Iridaceae
- Geosiridaceae

subordo Burmanniineae

- Burmanniaceae
- Corsiaceae

subordo Philydrineae

- Philydraceae

==== ordo Juncales ====
- Juncaceae
- Thurniaceae

==== ordo Bromeliales ====
- Bromeliaceae

==== ordo Commelinales ====
subordo Commelinineae

- Commelinaceae
- Xyridaceae
- Mayacaceae
- Rapateaceae

subordo Eriocaulineae

- Eriocaulaceae

subordo Restionineae

- Restionaceae
- Centrolepidaceae

subordo Flagellariineae

- Flagellariaceae

==== ordo Graminales ====
- Gramineae or Poaceae

==== ordo Principes ====
- Palmae or Arecaceae

==== ordo Synanthae ====
- Cyclanthaceae

==== ordo Spathiflorae ====
- Araceae
- Lemnaceae

==== ordo Pandanales ====
- Pandanaceae
- Sparganiaceae
- Typhaceae

==== ordo Cyperales ====
- Cyperaceae

==== ordo Scitamineae ====
- Musaceae
- Zingiberaceae
- Cannaceae
- Marantaceae
- Lowiaceae

==== ordo Microspermae ====
- Orchidaceae

=== classis Dicotyledoneae ===
==== subclassis Archychlamydeae ====
===== ordo Casuarinales =====
- Casuarinaceae

===== ordo Juglandales =====
- Myricaceae
- Juglandaceae

===== ordo Balanopales =====
- Balanopaceae

===== ordo Leitneriales =====
- Leitneriaceae
- Didymelaceae

===== ordo Salicales =====
- Salicaceae

===== ordo Fagales =====
- Betulaceae
- Fagaceae

===== ordo Urticales =====
- Rhoipteleaceae
- Ulmaceae
- Moraceae
- Urticaceae
- Eucommiaceae

===== ordo Proteales =====
- Proteaceae

===== ordo Santalales =====
subordo Santalineae

- Olacaceae
- Dipentodontaceae
- Opiliaceae
- Grubbiaceae
- Santalaceae
- Misodendraceae

subordo Loranthineae

- Loranthaceae

===== ordo Balanophorales =====
- Balanophoraceae

===== ordo Medusandrales =====
- Medusandraceae

===== ordo Polygonales =====
- Polygonaceae

===== ordo Centrospermae =====
subordo Phytolaccineae

- Phytolaccaceae
- Gyrostemonaceae
- Achatocarpaceae
- Nyctaginaceae
- Molluginaceae
- Aizoaceae

subordo Portulacineae

- Portulacaceae
- Basellaceae

subordo Caryophyllineae

- Caryophyllaceae

subordo Chenopodiineae

- Dysphaniaceae
- Chenopodiaceae
- Amaranthaceae

incertae sedis

- Didiereaceae

===== ordo Cactales =====
- Cactaceae

===== ordo Magnoliales =====
- Magnoliaceae
- Degeneriaceae
- Himantandraceae
- Winteraceae
- Annonaceae
- Eupomatiaceae
- Myristicaceae
- Canellaceae
- Schisandraceae
- Illiciaceae
- Austrobaileyaceae
- Trimeniaceae
- Amborellaceae
- Monimiaceae
- Calycanthaceae
- Gomortegaceae
- Lauraceae
- Hernandiaceae
- Tetracentraceae
- Trochodendraceae
- Eupteleaceae
- Cercidiphyllaceae

===== ordo Ranunculales =====
subordo Ranunculineae

- Ranunculaceae
- Berberidaceae
- Sargentodoxaceae
- Lardizabalaceae
- Menispermaceae

subordo Nymphaeineae

- Nymphaeaceae
- Ceratophyllaceae

===== ordo Piperales =====
- Saururaceae
- Piperaceae
- Chloranthaceae
- Lactoridaceae

===== ordo Aristolochiales =====
- Aristolochiaceae
- Rafflesiaceae
- Hydnoraceae

===== ordo Guttiferales =====
subordo Dilleniineae

- Dilleniaceae
- Paeoniaceae
- Crossosomataceae
- Medusagynaceae
- Actinidiaceae
- Eucryphiaceae

subordo Ochnineae

- Ochnaceae
- Dioncophyllaceae
- Strasburgeriaceae
- Dipterocarpaceae

subordo Theineae

- Theaceae
- Caryocaraceae
- Marcgraviaceae
- Quiinaceae
- Guttiferae or Clusiaceae

subordo Ancistrocladineae

- Ancistrocladaceae

===== ordo Sarraceniales =====
- Sarraceniaceae
- Nepenthaceae
- Droseraceae

===== ordo Papaverales =====
subordo Papaverineae

- Papaveraceae

subordo Capparineae

- Capparaceae
- Cruciferae or Brassicaceae
- Tovariaceae

subordo Resedineae

- Resedaceae

subordo Moringineae

- Moringaceae

===== ordo Batales =====
- Bataceae

===== ordo Rosales =====
subordo Hamamelidineae

- Platanaceae
- Hamamelidaceae
- Myrothamnaceae

subordo Saxifragineae

- Crassulaceae
- Cephalotaceae
- Saxifragaceae
- Brunelliaceae
- Cunoniaceae
- Davidsoniaceae
- Pittosporaceae
- Byblidaceae
- Roridulaceae
- Bruniaceae

subordo Rosineae

- Rosaceae
- Neuradaceae
- Chrysobalanaceae

subordo Leguminosineae

- Connaraceae
- Leguminosae or Fabaceae
- Krameriaceae

===== ordo Hydrostachyales =====
- Hydrostachyaceae

===== ordo Podostemales =====
- Podostemaceae

===== ordo Geraniales =====
subordo Limnanthineae

- Limnanthaceae

subordo Geraniineae

- Oxalidaceae
- Geraniaceae
- Tropaeolaceae
- Zygophyllaceae
- Linaceae
- Erythroxylaceae
- subordo Euphorbiineae
- Euphorbiaceae
- Daphniphyllaceae

===== ordo Rutales =====
subordo Rutineae

- Rutaceae
- Cneoraceae
- Simaroubaceae
- Picrodendraceae
- Burseraceae
- Meliaceae

subordo Malpighiineae

- Malpighiaceae
- Trigoniaceae
- Vochysiaceae

subordo Polygalineae

- Tremandraceae
- Polygalaceae

===== ordo Sapindales =====
subordo Coriariineae

- Coriariaceae

subordo Anacardiineae

- Anacardiaceae

subordo Sapindineae

- Aceraceae
- Bretschneideraceae
- Sapindaceae
- Hippocastanaceae
- Sabiaceae
- Melianthaceae
- Aextoxicaceae

subordo Balsamineae

- Balsaminaceae

===== ordo Julianiales =====
- Julianiaceae

===== ordo Celastrales =====
subordo Celastrineae

- Cyrillaceae
- Pentaphylacaceae
- Aquifoliaceae
- Corynocarpaceae
- Pandaceae
- Celastraceae
- Staphyleaceae
- Hippocrateaceae
- Stackhousiaceae
- Salvadoraceae

subordo Buxineae

- Buxaceae

subordo Icacinineae

- Icacinaceae
- Cardiopteridaceae

===== ordo Rhamnales =====
- Rhamnaceae
- Vitaceae
- Leeaceae

===== ordo Malvales =====
subordo Elaeocarpineae

- Elaeocarpaceae

subordo Sarcolaenineae

- Sarcolaenaceae

subordo Malvineae

- Tiliaceae
- Malvaceae
- Bombacaceae
- Sterculiaceae

subordo Scytopetalineae

- Scytopetalaceae

===== ordo Thymelaeales =====
- Family Geissolomataceae
  - Monotypic. It consists of genus Geissoloma Lindl. ex Kunth, and species Geissoloma marginatum, from Cape, South Africa.
- Family Penaeaceae from South Africa.
  - Tribe Endonemeae
    - Endonema A.Juss.
    - Glischrocolla (Endl.) A.DC.
  - Tribe Penaeeae
    - Brachysiphon A.Juss.
    - Penaea L.
    - Saltera Bullock (syn.:Sarcocolla Kunth)

Note: Sonderothamnus R.Dahlgren, 1968 is posterior to the publication of this work, and Stylapterus A.Juss. was included by G. Bentham & J.D. Hooker in Penaea.

- Family Dichapetalaceae
  - Dichapetalum Thouars
  - Gonypetalum Ule (currently syn. of Tapura)
  - Stephanopodium Poepp.
  - Tapura Aubl.
- Family Thymelaeaceae

Note: the classification of Thymelaeaceae was based on Domke 1934.

  - Subfamily Gonystyloideae (Syn.:Gonystylaceae)
    - Aetoxilon
    - Amyxa
    - Gonystylus
  - Subfamily Aquilarioideae
    - Tribe Microsemmateae
    - Tribe Solmsieae
    - Tribe Octolepideae
    - Tribe Aquilarieae
  - Subfamily Gilgiodaphnoideae (or Synandrodaphnoideae)
    - Monotypic. It consists of genus Gilgiodaphne (currently synonym of Synandrodaphne Gilg), and species Gilgiodaphne paradoxa, syn. of Synandrodaphne paradoxa, from West Africa.
  - Subfamily Thymelaeoideae
    - Tribe Dicranolepideae
    - Tribe Phalerieae
    - Tribe Daphneae
    - Tribe Thymelaeeae (Syn.:Gnidieae)
- Family Elaeagnaceae
  - Elaeagnus
  - Hippophae
  - Shepherdia

===== ordo Violales =====
subordo Flacourtiineae

- Flacourtiaceae
- Peridiscaceae
- Violaceae
- Stachyuraceae
- Scyphostegiaceae
- Turneraceae
- Malesherbiaceae
- Passifloraceae
- Achariaceae

subordo Cistineae

- Cistaceae
- Bixaceae
- Sphaerosepalaceae
- Cochlospermaceae

subordo Tamaricineae

- Tamaricaceae
- Frankeniaceae
- Elatinaceae

subordo Caricineae

- Caricaceae

subordo Loasineae

- Loasaceae

subordo Begoniineae

- Datiscaceae
- Begoniaceae

===== ordo Cucurbitales =====
- Cucurbitaceae

===== ordo Myrtiflorae =====
subordo Myrtineae

- Lythraceae
- Trapaceae
- Crypteroniaceae
- Myrtaceae
- Dialypetalanthaceae
- Sonneratiaceae
- Punicaceae
- Lecythidaceae
- Melastomataceae
- Rhizophoraceae
- Combretaceae
- Onagraceae
- Oliniaceae
- Haloragaceae
- Theligonaceae

subordo Hippuridineae

- Hippuridaceae

subordo Cynomoriineae

- Cynomoriaceae

===== ordo Umbelliflorae =====
- Alangiaceae
- Nyssaceae
- Davidiaceae
- Cornaceae
- Garryaceae
- Araliaceae
- Umbelliferae or Apiaceae

==== subclassis Sympetalae ====
===== ordo Diapensiales =====
- Diapensiaceae

===== ordo Ericales =====
- Clethraceae
- Pyrolaceae
- Ericaceae
- Empetraceae
- Epacridaceae

===== ordo Primulales =====
- Theophrastaceae
- Myrsinaceae
- Primulaceae

===== ordo Plumbaginales =====
- Plumbaginaceae

===== ordo Ebenales =====
subordo Sapotineae

- Sapotaceae
- Sarcospermataceae

subordo Ebenineae

- Ebenaceae
- Styracaceae
- Lissocarpaceae
- Symplocaceae
- Hoplestigmataceae

===== ordo Oleales =====
- Oleaceae

===== ordo Gentianales =====
- Loganiaceae
- Desfontainiaceae
- Gentianaceae
- Menyanthaceae
- Apocynaceae
- Asclepiadaceae
- Rubiaceae

===== ordo Tubiflorae =====
subordo Convolvulineae

- Polemoniaceae
- Fouquieriaceae
- Convolvulaceae

subordo Boraginineae

- Hydrophyllaceae
- Boraginaceae
- Lennoaceae

subordo Verbenineae

- Verbenaceae
- Callitrichaceae
- Labiatae or Lamiaceae

subordo Solanineae

- Nolanaceae
- Solanaceae
- Duckeodendraceae
- Buddlejaceae
- Scrophulariaceae
- Globulariaceae
- Bignoniaceae
- Henriqueziaceae
- Acanthaceae
- Pedaliaceae
- Martyniaceae
- Gesneriaceae
- Columelliaceae
- Orobanchaceae
- Lentibulariaceae

subordo Myoporineae

- Myoporaceae

subordo Phrymineae

- Phrymaceae

===== ordo Plantaginales =====
- Plantaginaceae

===== ordo Dipsacales =====
- Caprifoliaceae
- Adoxaceae
- Valerianaceae
- Dipsacaceae

===== ordo Campanulales =====
- Campanulaceae
- Sphenocleaceae
- Pentaphragmataceae
- Goodeniaceae
- Brunoniaceae
- Stylidiaceae
- Calyceraceae
- Compositae or Asteraceae

== Bibliography ==
- Melchior, Hans; Werdermann, Erich, eds. (1964) [1892]. A. Engler's Syllabus der Pflanzenfamilien (12th ed.). Stuttgart: Schweizerbart.
  - I. Band: Allgemeiner Teil. Bakterien bis Gymnospermen. ISBN 978-3-443-39015-0
  - II. Band: Angiospermen. ISBN 978-3-443-39016-7
