= Johannes Paulus Lotsy =

Dutch botanist known for his work on plant taxonomy

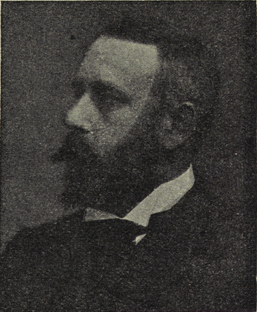
- Johannes Paulus Lotsy
- Born: 11 April 1867; Dordrecht
- Died: 17 November 1931 (aged 64); Voorburg
- Known for: Works on evolution and heredity.
- Spouse: Catharina Christina Goossen
- Scientific career
- Author abbrev. (botany): Lotsy

Johannes Paulus Lotsy or Jan Paulus Lotsy (11 April 1867 – 17 November 1931) was a Dutch botanist, specializing in evolution and heredity. He promoted the idea of evolution being driven by hybridization.

== Career ==
Lotsy was born into a wealthy family in Dordrecht and went to study at the Wageningen Agricultural College where his teachers included Martinus Beijerinck and then at the Göttingen University (1886-1890) where he studied lichens for his doctorate. He then went to Johns Hopkins University (1891–1895), as a lecturer and also served as director of the herbarium. From 1896 to 1900 he was sent to Java to work on cinchona research. He returned after suffering from malaria and then taught at Leiden University (1904-1909), as a lecturer in Systematic Botany. He became director of the State Herbarium (Rijksherbarium) 1906–1909, then Secretary of the Hollandsche Maatschappij van Wetenschappen.

Lotsy founded the Association internationale des Botanistes and was editor of the Botanisches Centralblatt and the Progressus rei botanicae. He proposed a system of plant classification, based on phylogenetics. Lotsy argued for a major role of hybridization in evolution, including claims for human evolution.

Lotsy died at Voorburg following a surgery.

== Travels ==
India (1895–1900), the United States (1922), Australia and New Zealand (1925), South Africa (1926–27), and Egypt (1930). He also studied the flora of Italy and Switzerland.

== Publications ==
- 1928. Voyages of exploration to judge of the bearing of hybridization upon evolution (Genetica : nederlandsch tijdschrift voor erfelijheids- en afstammingsleer). Ed. M. Nijhoff
- 1922a. Van den Atlantischen Oceaan naar de Stille Zuidzee
- 1922b. A popular account of evolution. The Cawthron institute, Nelson, Nueva Zelanda. Cawthron lecture. Ed. R.W. Stiles & Co. 22 pp.
- 1915. Het Tegenwoordige Standpunt der Evolutie-leer
- 1911. Série IIIA. Sciences exactes. 1–4. Rédigées par J. P. Lotsy
- 1906a. Résultats scientifiques du Congrès international de botanique, Vienne, 1905. Wissenschaftliche Ergebnisse des Internationalen botanischen Kongresses, Wien, 1905 ... Redigiert von J. P. Lotsy ... Mit ... 1 Karte, etc
- 1906b. Vorlesungen über Deszendenztheorien, mit besonderer Berücksichtigung der botanischen Seite der Frage, gehalten an der Reichsuniversität zu Leiden, etc.
- 1899. Rhopalocnemis Phalloides Jungh: A morphological-systematical study. Ed. E.J. Brill
- 1898. Contributions to the life-history of the genus Gnetum. Ed. E.J. Brill
- 1894. A contribution to the investigation of the assimilation of free atmospheric nitrogen by white and black mustard. Bulletin / U.S. Department of Agriculture, Office of Experiment Stations. G.P.O. 19 pp.

=== Books ===
- 2008. Evolution By Means Of Hybridization. Reeditado Maudsley Press. 176 pp. ISBN 978-1-4097-0261-0
- 1928. A Popular Account of Evolution
- 1925. Evolution considered in the light of Hybridization. Ed. Canterbury College by Andrews, Baty & Co. 66 pp.
- 1916. Evolution by Means of Hybridization. The Hague, Martinus Nijhoff, 166 pp.
- 1907–1911. Vorträge über botanische Stammesgeschichte gehalten an der Reichsuniversität zu Leiden. Ein Lehrbuch der Pflanzensystematik. In drei Bände. Jena, Verlag von Gustav Fischer. With illustrations.
  - I. Algen und Pilze (Thallophyta) Jena: Gustav Fischer, 1907.
  - II. Cormophyta Zoidogamia Jena: Gustav Fischer, 1909.
  - III. Lotsy, J. P. (1911). Vorträge über botanische stammesgeschichte, gehalten an der Reichsuniversität zu Leiden. Ein lehrbuch der pflanzensystematick. III Cormophyta Siphonogamia (in German). Jena: G. Fischer.

== System ==
Lotsy argued that the monocotyledons were diphyletic, with the Spadiciflorae being derived from the dicotyledons (specifically Piperales) and the remainder from a hypothetical ancestor, the Proranales. Hutchinson, who argued for a monophyletic origin, considered this improbable.

=== Synopsis ===
Vorträge über botanische Stammesgeschichte

- Volume 3: Cormophyta Siphonogamia Part 1
  - Monocotyledons vol 3(1) p. 514–564, 625–864
    - Spadiciflorae p. 514–564
      - Araceae
      - Lemnaceae
      - Cyclanthaceae
      - Palmaceae
      - Pandanaceae
      - Sparganiaceae
      - Typhaceae
      - Alismataceae
      - Butomaceae
      - Hydrocharitaceae
      - Scheuchzeriaceae
      - Zosteraceae
      - Posidoniaceae
      - Aponogetonaceae
      - Potamogetonaceae
      - Najadaceae
      - Altheniaceae
      - Cymodoceaceae
      - Triuridaceae
    - Enantioblastae p. 693-714
      - Commelinaceae
      - Mayacaceae
      - Xyridaceae
      - Eriocaulaceae
      - Centrolepidaceae
      - Restionaceae
      - Pontederiaceae
    - Liliifloren p. 715–766, 792–834
      - Liliaceae 714
      - Melanthiaceae 717
      - Asphodelaceae 722
      - Aloinaceae 725
      - Eriospermaceae 730
      - Johnsoniaceae 731
      - Agapanthaceae 732
      - Alliaceae
      - Gilliesiaceae 734
      - Tulipaceae 735
      - Scillaceae 741
      - Asparagaceae 743
      - Dracaenaceae 749
      - Smilaceae 759
      - Luzuriagaceae 760
      - Ophiopogonaceae
      - Lomandraceae 761
      - Dasypogonaceae 763
      - Calectasiaceae 764
      - Juncaceae
      - Flagellariaceae 765
      - Stemonaceae (Roxburghiaceae) 792
      - Cyanastraceae 793
      - Iridaceae 794
        - Crocoideae
        - Iridoideae 796
        - Ixioideae 799
      - Haemodoraceae 800
      - Amaryllidaceae 801, 811
      - Hypoxidaceae
      - Vellosiaceae 802
      - Agavaceae 806
      - Bromeliaceae 814
      - Dioscoreaceae 823
      - Taccaceae 826
      - Burmanniaceen 829
    - Glumifloren p. 767–791
      - Cyperaceae
      - Graminaceae
    - Scitamineae p. 835–864
      - Musaceae
      - Cannaceae
      - Zingiberaceae
      - Marantaceae
      - Orchidaceae
  - Index p. 952

== See also ==
- Category:Taxa named by Johannes Paulus Lotsy

== Bibliography ==
- Hutchinson, John (1959). The families of flowering plants, arranged according to a new system based on their probable phylogeny. 2 vols (2nd ed.). Macmillan., Volume 2 at Internet Archive
- Works by or about Johannes Paulus Lotsy at the Internet Archive
- Nature obituary
- National Herbarium Nederland: Lotsy, Johannes Paulus
