= Hans Melchior =

German botanist (1894–1984)

Hans Melchior (5 August 1894 – 12 March 1984) was a German botanist.

Melchior was born in Berlin. He studied botany at University of Berlin, became assistant to G. Haberlandt at the Institute for plant physiology and took his doctor's degree with him in 1920.

Later he was assistant at the Botanical Museum and Herbarium, Berlin-Dahlem, on 1 October 1920, the beginning of an uninterrupted career at that institute in which he went through all the ranks, ending as interim director (1958–1959), and having been professor of botany from 1940 teaching at the Technische Hochschule in Charlottenburg (now Technische Universität Berlin).

Among his many contributions to taxonomy are his treatments of the Medusagynaceae, Theaceae, Violaceae, and Canellaceae for the second edition of the Die Natürlichen Pflanzenfamilien of Engler & K. Prantl, the publication as editor with E. Werdermann, of ed. 12 (1954-1964) of Engler's "Syllabus der Pflanzenfamilien", and, as a last major contribution (with Hans Kastner) of Gewürze (1974). He died in Berlin, aged 89.

His main interest was in the Violaceae, Theaceae, and Bignoniaceae and, especially in his earlier years, in the flora of the Alps. He received his introduction to this flora in his excursions as a student with Engler, retained the best possible memories of these events, and attributed to them the awakening of his interest in plant systematics. Melchior was a founding member of I.A.P.T. and stayed in this institution until his death.

The plant genus Melchiora Kobuski, now a synonym of Balthasaria in the family Pentaphylacaceae, was named in his honour.

== See also ==
- Melchior system his taxonomic plant system (Flowering plants)
