= Lindley system =

Taxonomic system of plant classification, by John Lindley (1799–1865)

An early system of plant taxonomy, the Lindley system, was first published by John Lindley as An Introduction to the Natural System of Botany (Natural History, 1830). This was a minor modification of that of de Candolle (1813). He developed this further over a number of publications, including the Nixus plantarum (1833) and a second edition of Natural History (1836), in which he introduced the concept of a higher order of taxonomic rank, the Alliances, in which he embedded the Tribes (families). He also expanded his ideas on Exogens in his entry of that name in the Penny Cyclopedia (1838). In 1839 he revised his division of the plant kingdom into classes in an article in the Botanical Register. Lindley's system culminated in the three editions of his Vegetable Kingdom (1846, 1847, 1853).

The schema of the Natural History is shown on pages xxxv and xxxvii-xlviii. In the Vegetable Kingdom, the schema for the first edition is on pp. lv–lxviii. The third and final edition was published in 1853, with the schema on p. lv. Cross references from Natural History to Vegetable Kingdom in [Square brackets].

== Summary ==
=== An Introduction to the Natural History of Botany (1830) ===
Schema p. xxxv,
Outline p. xxxvii
Index p. 345
Genera organised into Orders (referred to as Tribes, in English)

- Class I: Vasculares (Flowering plants) p. 1
  - Subclass I: Exogenae (Dicotyledons) p. 1
    - Tribe I. Angiospermae p. 2
    - Tribe II. Gymnospermae p. 245
  - Subclass II: Endogenae (Monocotyledons) p. 251
    - Tribe I Petaloideae p. 252
    - Tribe II Glumaceae
- Class II: Cellulares (Flowerless plants)
  - 1. Filicoideae
  - 2. Muscoideae
  - 3. Aphyllae
- Index to Introduction to Natural History p. 345

=== Vegetable Kingdom (1846–1853) ===
Summary of previous systems p. xxxv (see Notes)
Schema for 1846 and 1853 p. lv
Genera organised into Alliances and Orders

Flowerless plants (Asexual)

- Class I: Thallogens
- Class II: Acrogens

Flowering plants (Sexual)

- Class III: Rhizogens
- Class IV: Endogens
- Class V: Dictyogens
- Class VI: Gymnogens
- Class VII: Exogens
- Index to Vegetable Kingdom p. 833

== Natural History orders (1830–1836) ==
165 orders (list p. 3)

=== Class I: Vasculares: Flowering plants ===
p. 1

==== Subclass I: Exogenae (Dicotyledons) ====
- Tribe I. Angiospermae p. 2
  - Polypetale 165 orders p. 2
    - Thalamiflorae
      - Apocarpae
        - 23. Menispermeae p. 31
        - ...
        - 117. Coriarieae p. 135
      - Syncarpae
        - 5. Nymphaeaceae
        - ...
        - 130. Violaceae (Violets) p. 146
        - ...
        - 107. Humiriaceae
    - Calyciflorae
      - Apocarpae
      - 38. Saxifrageae
      - ...
      - 147. Crassulaceae
      - Syncarpae
        - 132. Malesherbiaceae
        - ...
        - 1. Araliaceae (Aralia) p. 4
        - ...
        - 58. Alangieae
  - Apetale
    - Aristolochiae
    - ...
    - Empetreae
  - Achlamydeae
    - Podostemeae
    - ....
    - Piperaceae
  - Monopetale
    - Gesnereae
    - ...
    - Orobancheae
- Tribe II. Gymnospermae p. 245
  - Coniferae
  - Cycadeae

==== Subclass II: Endogenae (Monocotyledons) ====
Endogenae, or Monocotyledonous Plants p. 251

- Tribe I Petaloideae 32 orders p. 252

(May be Tripetaloideous, Hexapetaloideous or Spadiceous)

  - Tripetaloideae 8 orders
    - 230 Butomeae (p. 253) [Alismales 208]
    - 229 Alismaceae (p. 253) [Alismales 209]
    - 232 Commelineae (p. 255) [Xyridales 188]
    - 233 Xyrideae (p. 255) [Xyridales 187]
    - 231 Hydrocharideae (p. 254) [Hydrales 141]
    - 234 Bromeliaceae (p. 256) [Narcissales 147]
    - 241 Scitamineae (p. 265)
    - 242 Marantaceae (p. 267) [Amomales 168]
  - Hexapetaloideae(17 orders)
    - 235: Hypoxideae
    - 236: Burmannieae (p. 257)
    - 237: Haemodoraceae (Blood-root tribe) p. 258*** 239: Irideae (Cornflag tribe) p. 260
    - 238: Amaryllideae (Narcissus tribe) p. 259*** 240: Orchideae
    - 239: Irideae (p. 260) [Narcissales 159]
    - 240 Orchideae (p. 262) [Orchidales 173]

.....

    - 243 Musaceae (p. 269)
    - 235 Hypoxideae (p. 257) [Narcissales 154]
    - 238 Amaryllideae (p. 259) [Narcissales 155]
    - 237 Haemadoraceae (p. 258) [Narcissales 155]
    - ............
    - ............
    - 244 Junceae (p. 270) [Juncales 191]
    - 247 Asphodeleae (p. 273) [Liliaceae 200]
    - 248 Gilliesieae (p. 275) [Liliales 196]
    - 251 Liliaceae (p. 279) [Liliales 200]
    - 249 Smilaceae (p. 277)
    - 253 Restiaceae (p. 283) [Glumales 121] - Glumaceae
  - Spadiceae (7 orders)
    - 254 Pandaneae p. 284
    - 255 Typhaceae p. 285
    - 256 Aroideae p. 286
    - 257 Balanophoreae p. 288
    - 258 Fluviales p. 289
    - 259 Juncagineae p. 290
    - 259 Pistiaceae p. 291 [Arales 124]
- Tribe II Glumaceae 2 orders p. 292 [Glumales 105]
  - Cyperaceae [107]
  - Gramineae p. 292 [Graminaceae 106]

=== Class II: Cellulares: Flowerless plants ===
p. 307

- 1. Filicoideae, or Fern-like plants
  - Equisetaceae
  - Filices
  - Lycopodiaceae
  - Marsileaceae
- 2. Muscoideae, or Moss-like plants
  - Musci
  - Hepaticae
  - Characeae
- 3. Aphyllae
  - Lichenes
  - Fungi
  - Algae

== Vegetable Kingdom alliances and orders (1846–1853) ==
(pages refer to 1853 edition)

=== Flowerless plants ===
p. 5

==== Class I: Thallogens ====
3 Alliances

  - Algales p. 8
    - Diatomaceae
    - ...
    - Characeae
  - Fungales, Fungi p. 29
    - Hymenomycetes
    - ...
    - Physomycetes
  - Lichenales, Lichens p. 45
    - Graphidaceae
    - Collemaceae
    - Parmeliaceae

==== Class II: Acrogens ====
3 Alliances p. 51

  - Muscales, or Moss-like plants p. 54
    - Hepaticae
      - Ricciaceae
      - ...
      - Equisetaceae, Horsetails
    - Musci
      - Andraeaceae
      - Bryaceae
  - Lycopodales p. 68
    - Lycopodaceae
    - Marsileaceae
  - Filicales p. 74
    - Ophioglossaceae
    - Polypodiaceae, Ferns
    - Danaeaceae

=== Flowering plants ===
==== Class III: Rhizogens ====
3 orders p. 83

- Balanophoraceae p. 88
- Cytinaceae p. 91
- Rafflesiaceae p. 93

==== Class IV: Endogens (Monocotyledons) ====
11 Alliances p. 95

- Glumales 5 orders p. 105
  - Graminaceae, Grasses
  - Cyperaceae, Sedges
  - ...
  - Eriocaulaceae, Pipeworts
- Arales 4 orders p. 123
  - Pistiaceae
  - Typhaceae
  - Araceae
  - Pandanaceae
- Palmales, Palms 1 order p. 133
  - Palmaceae
- Hydrales 4 orders p. 140
  - Hydrocharidaceae
  - Naiadaceae
  - Triuridaceae
  - Zosteraceae
- Narcissales 6 orders p. 146
  - Bromeliaceae p. 147
  - Taccaceae
  - Haemodoraceae
  - Hypoxidaceae p. 154
  - Amaryllidaceae, Amaryllids 4 tribes 68 genera 400 species p. 155
    - Amarylleae
    - Narcisseae
    - Alstromerieae
    - Agaveae
  - Iridaceae p. 159 (53 Genera, 550 species)
- Amomales 3 orders p. 162
  - Musaceae
  - Zingiberaceae
  - Marantaceae
- Orchidales 3 orders p. 170
  - Burmanniaceae
  - Orchidaceae, Orchids
  - Apostasiaceae
- Xyridales 4 orders p. 185
  - Philydraceae
  - ....
  - Mayaceae
- Juncales 2 orders p. 190
  - Juncaceae, Rushes
  - Orontiaceae
- Liliales p. 195 4 orders
  - Gilliesiaceae p. 196
  - Melanthaceae
  - Liliaceae, Lilyworts 11 tribes 133 genera 1200 species p. 200
    - I Tulipeae
    - ...
    - IV Scilleae
    - ...
    - IX Asparageae
    - ...
    - XI Ophiopogoneae
  - Pontederaceae
- Alismales 3 orders p. 207
  - Butomaceae
  - Alismaceae
  - Juncaginaceae

==== Class V: Dictyogens ====
5 orders p. 211

- Dioscoreaceae, Yams p. 214
- ...
- Roxburghiaceae

==== Class VI: Gymnogens ====
4 orders p. 221

- Cycadaceae, Cycads
- Pinaceae, Conifers p. 226
- Taxaceae
- Gnetaceae

==== Class VII: Exogens ====
4 subclasses

- Sub-class I: Diclinous Exogens 8 alliances p. 249
- Sub-class II: Hypogynous Exogens 13 alliances p. 325
  - Alliance 26: Violales p. 325
    - Family 116: Violaceae p. 338
- Sub-class III: Perigynous Exogens 10 alliances p. 523
  - 48. Echiales p. 649
    - Family 258: Boraginaceae p. 655
- Sub-class IV: Epigynous Exogens 7 alliances p. 688

== Notes ==
His final schemata is illustrated in the Vegetable Kingdom, his last work, on pages lv-lxvii. In this work he also reviews all his previous publications relative to the many known systems published at that time.

== Bibliography ==
- Lindley, John (1833). Nixus plantarum. London: Apud Ridgway et filios.
- Lindley, John (1838). "Exogens". The Penny Cyclopaedia of the Society for the Diffusion of Useful Knowledge. vol. X Ernesti–Frustum. London: Charles Knight. pp. 120–123.
- Lindley, John (1839). "Primary Distribution of the Vegetable Garden". Botanical Register. xxv: 76–81.

A Natural System of Botany (1830–1836)

- Lindley, John (1830). An introduction to the natural system of botany: or, A systematic view of the organisation, natural affinities, and geographical distribution, of the whole vegetable kingdom: together with the uses of the most important species in medicine, the arts, and rural or domestic economy (1st ed.). London: Longman.
- Lindley, John (1836) [1830]. A natural system of botany; or, A systematic view of the organization, natural affinities, and geographical distribution of the whole vegetable kingdom: together with the uses of the most important species in medicine, the arts, and rural or domestic economy (2nd ed.). London: Longman.

The Vegetable Kingdom (1846–1853)

- Lindley, John (1846). The Vegetable Kingdom: or, The structure, classification, and uses of plants, illustrated upon the natural system (1st ed.). London: Bradbury.
- Lindley, John (1847) [1846]. The Vegetable Kingdom: or, The structure, classification, and uses of plants, illustrated upon the natural system (2nd ed.). London: Bradbury & Evans.
- Lindley, John (1853) [1846]. The Vegetable Kingdom: or, The structure, classification, and uses of plants, illustrated upon the natural system (3rd. ed.). London: Bradbury & Evans.
