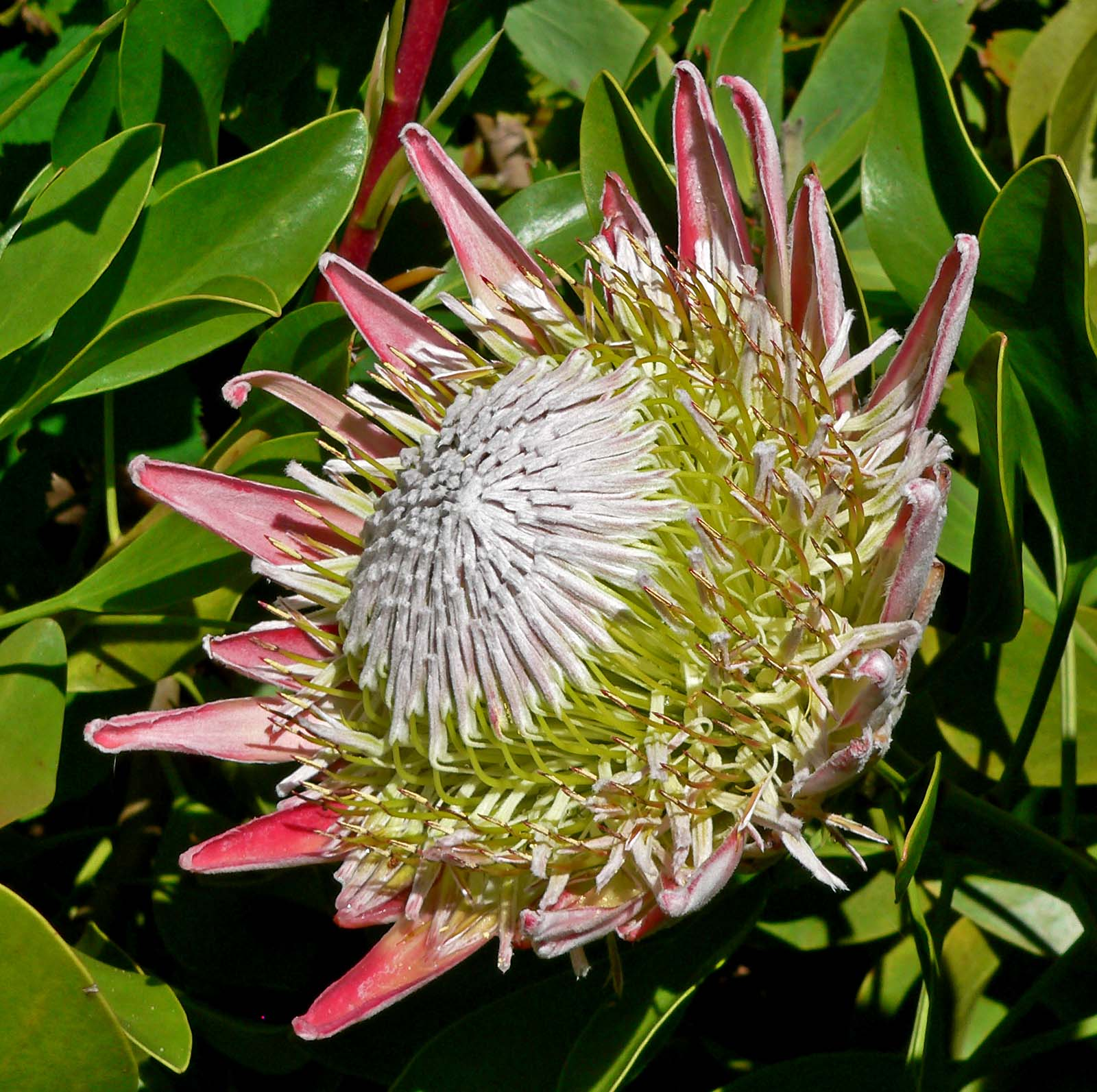
- Protea cynaroides

Scientific classification
- Kingdom: Plantae
- Clade: Tracheophytes
- Clade: Angiosperms
- Clade: Eudicots
- Order: Proteales; Juss. ex Bercht. & J.Presl

Families
- Nelumbonaceae; Platanaceae; Proteaceae; Sabiaceae

Synonyms
- synonymy: Meliosmales C. Y. Wu et al.; Nelumbonales Martius; Nelumbonanae Reveal; Nelumbonidae Takhtajan; Nelumbonineae Shipunov; Nelumbonopsida Endlicher; Platanales Martius; Proteanae Takhtajan; Proteinae Reveal; Proteopsida Bartling; Sabiales Takhtajan; Sabianae Doweld

= Proteales =

Proteales Temporal range: Early Cretaceous - recent

Order of eudicot flowering plants

Proteales is an order of flowering plants consisting of three (or four) families. The Proteales have been recognized by almost all taxonomists.

The representatives of the Proteales can be very different from each other due to their very early divergence. They possess seeds with little or no endosperm. The ovules are often atropic.

The oldest fossils of Proteales are of the nelumbonaceous genus Notocyamus from the Barremian stage of the Early Cretaceous of Brazil, 126–121 Ma (million years ago). According to molecular clock calculations, the lineage that led to Proteales split from other plants about 128 Ma or 125 Ma.

== Families ==
Within the classification system of Rolf Dahlgren, the Proteales were in the superorder Proteiflorae, also called Proteanae; The APG II system (of 2003) also recognizes this order, placing it in the clade Eudicots, with the following circumscription:

- order Proteales

- family Nelumbonaceae
- family Proteaceae [+ family Platanaceae]

with "+ ..." = optionally separate family (that may be split off from the preceding family).

The APG III system of 2009 followed this same approach, but favored the narrower circumscription of the three families, firmly recognizing three families in Proteales: Nelumbonaceae, Platanaceae, and Proteaceae. The Angiosperm Phylogeny Website, however, suggests the addition of Sabiaceae, which the APG III system did not place in any order in the eudicots, would be sensible.

The APG IV system of 2016 added family Sabiaceae to the order.

Well-known members of the Proteales include the proteas of South Africa, the banksia and macadamia of Australia, the planetree, and the sacred lotus. The origins of the order are clearly ancient, with evidence of diversification in the mid-Cretaceous, roughly over 100 million years ago. Of notable interest is the family's modern distribution; the Proteaceae is predominantly a Southern Hemisphere family, while the Platanaceae and Nelumbonaceae are Northern Hemisphere plants.

== Classification ==
The current APG IV classification represents a slight change from the APG I system of 1998, which firmly did accept family Platanaceae as being separate from the order. Under APG IV, this is the current circumscription of the order:

- order Proteales

- family Nelumbonaceae
- family Platanaceae
- family Proteaceae
- family Sabiaceae

=== Cronquist ===
The Cronquist system of 1981 recognized such an order and placed it in subclass Rosidae in class Magnoliopsida [=dicotyledons]. It used this circumscription:

- order Proteales

- family Elaeagnaceae
- family Proteaceae

=== Dahlgren; Thorne; Engler; and Wettstein ===
The Dahlgren system and Thorne system (1992) recognized such an order and placed it in superorder Proteanae in subclass Magnoliidae [=dicotyledons]. The Engler system, in its update of 1964, also recognized this order and placed it in subclass Archichlamydeae of class Dicotyledoneae. The Wettstein system, last revised in 1935, recognized this order and placed it in the Monochlamydeae in subclass Choripetalae of class Dicotyledones. These systems used the following circumscription:

- order Proteales

- family Proteaceae
