= Microspermae =

Order of orchids

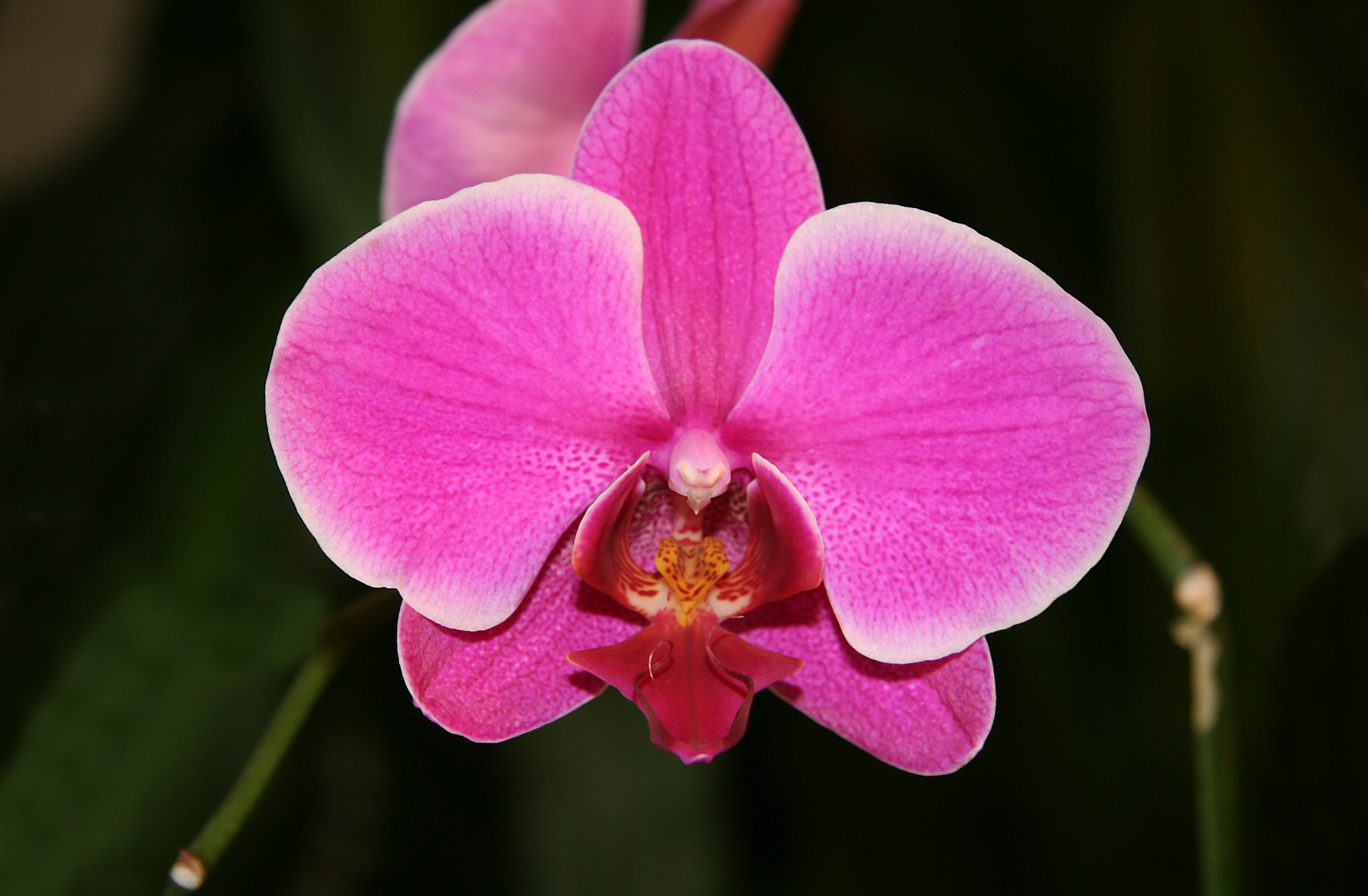
Phalaenopsis orchid

Microspermae is an order of flowering plants represented by the family Orchidaceae. It is a descriptive botanical name referring to the size of the seed; it was used for the order containing the orchids.

In taxonomical systems this name has now mostly dropped out of use, being displaced by the name Orchidales (formed from the family name Orchidaceae). The name Microspermae was used in the Bentham & Hooker and the Engler systems. The Wettstein system also used a descriptive name, but preferred Gynandrae.

== Microspermae in the Bentham & Hooker system ==
- order Microspermae
  family Hydrocharideae
  family Burmanniaceae
  family Orchideae

== Microspermae in the Engler system ==
- order Microspermae
  family Orchidaceae
