= Cormophyte =

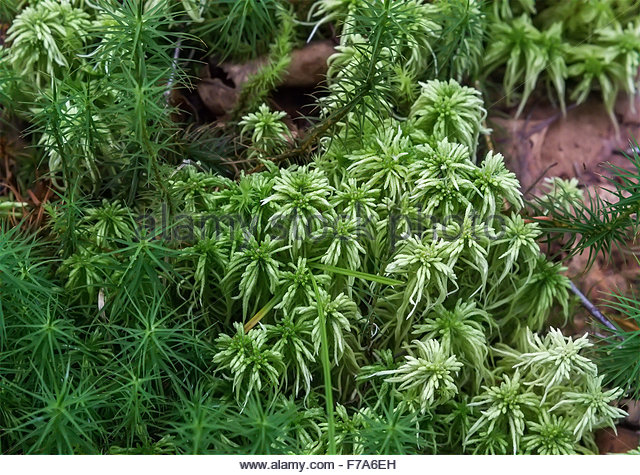

Cormophytes (Cormophyta) is a historical term seldom used today for the plants that are differentiated into roots, stems and leaves. These plants differ from thallophytes, whose body is referred to as the thallus, i.e. a simple body not differentiated into leaves and stems. Definitions have varied, notably about whether mosses and liverworts are included.

Stephan Endlicher, a 19th-century Austrian botanist, divided the vegetable kingdom in 1836 into two groups: the thallophytes were only the algae, lichens and fungi, and the cormophytes were the mosses, liverworts, ferns, Equisitaceae, club mosses and seed plants.
