= List of systems of plant taxonomy =

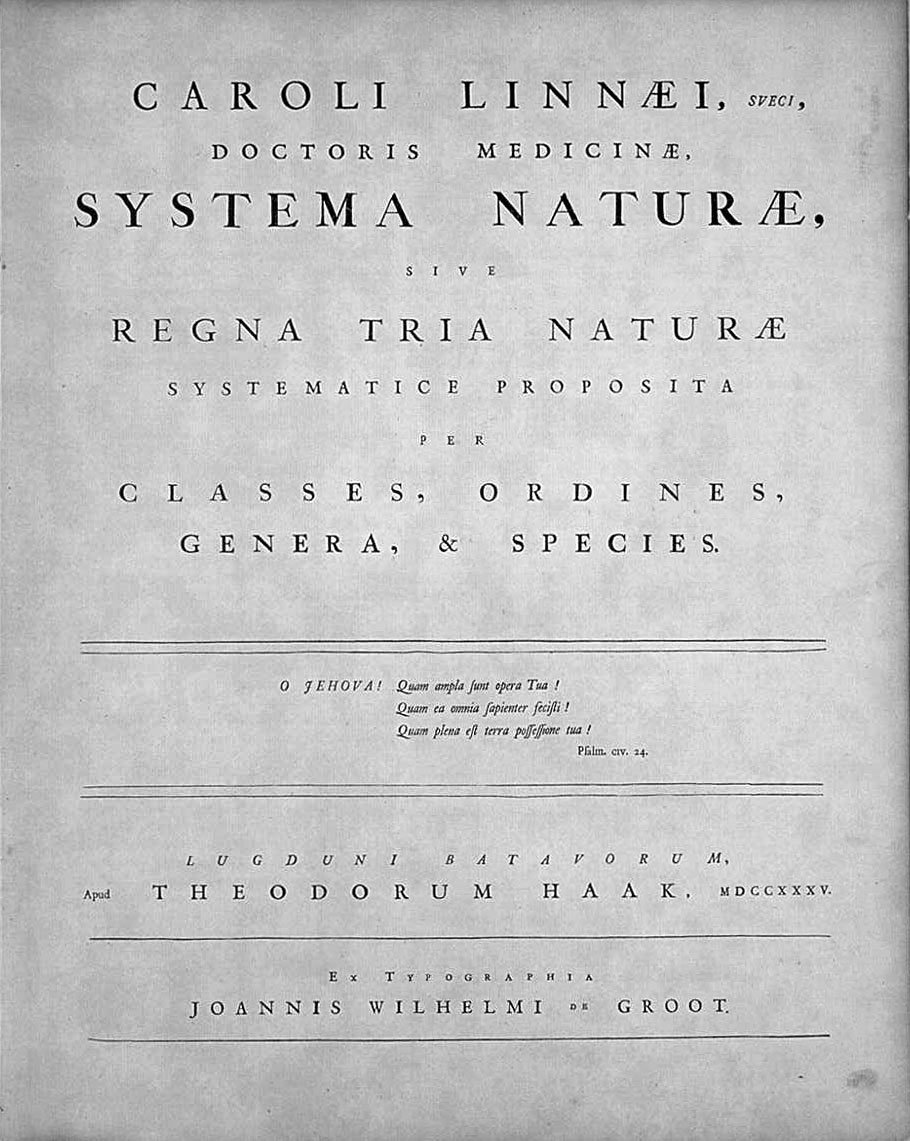
A pioneering system of plant taxonomy, Linnaeus's Systema Naturae, Leiden, 1735

This list of systems of plant taxonomy presents "taxonomic systems" used in plant classification.

A taxonomic system is a coherent whole of taxonomic judgments on circumscription and placement of the considered taxa. It is only a "system" if it is applied to a large group of such taxa (for example, all the flowering plants).

There are two main criteria for this list. A system must be taxonomic, that is deal with many plants, by their botanical names. Secondly it must be a system, i.e. deal with the relationships of plants. Although thinking about relationships of plants had started much earlier (see history of plant systematics), such systems really only came into being in the 19th century, as a result of an ever-increasing influx from all over the world of newly discovered plant species. The 18th century saw some early systems, which are perhaps precursors rather than full taxonomic systems.

A milestone event was the publication of Species Plantarum by Linnaeus which serves as the starting point of binomial nomenclature for plants, but it does not deal with relationships, beyond assigning plants into genera.

Systems are not necessarily monolithic; they often go through several stages of development, resulting in several versions. When a system is widely adopted, many authors adopt their own particular version. The Cronquist system exists in many versions.

== Chronological list of systems ==
=== Pre-Linnaean ===
- Theophrastus classification
  Historia Plantarum (Enquiry into Plants), c. 300 BC
  Causes of Plants, c. 300 BC
  Dioscorides classification
  De Materia Medica, c. 60 AD
  Albertus Magnus classification
  De Vegetabilibus, c. 1256
  Caesalpino classification
  De plantis libri XVI, 1583
  John Gerard classification
  Herball, or Generall Historie of Plantes, 1597
  Gaspard Bauhin classification
  Pinax theatri botanici, 1623
  John Ray classification
  Historia Plantarum, 1686–1704
  Tournefort classification
  Éléments de botanique, 1694

=== From Linnaeus to Darwin (pre-Darwinian) ===
- Linnaean systems
  Systema Naturae, 1st edition, 1735.
  Systema Naturae, 10th edition, 1758 (vol. 1), 1759 (vol. 2). Starting point of zoological nomenclature.
  Species Plantarum, 1753. Starting point of botanical nomenclature.
  Genera Plantarum, 1737 (1st ed.), 1753 (5th ed.).
  Philosophia Botanica, 1751.
- Adanson system
  Familles naturelles des plantes, 1763.
- de Jussieu system
  A.L. de Jussieu (1789). Genera Plantarum, secundum ordines naturales disposita juxta methodum in Horto Regio Parisiensi exaratam. apud viduam Herissant, typographum, viâ novâ B. M. sub signo Crucis aureæ.
  (available online at Gallica)
- de Candolle system
  A. P. de Candolle (1819). Théorie Élémentaire de la botanique, ou exposition des principes de la classification naturelle et de l'art de décrire et d'etudier les végétaux (2nd ed.).
  A. P. de Candolle; et al. (1824–1873). Prodromus systematis naturalis regni vegetabilis sive enumeratio contracta ordinum, generum specierumque plantarum huc usque cognitarum, juxta methodi naturalis normas digesta.
  (available online at Gallica)
- Berchtold and Presl system
  Berchtold and Presl. O Prirozenosti Rostlin 1820
- Dumortier system
  Dumortier, Barthélemy-Charles (1829). Analyse des familles des plantes: avec l'indication des principaux genres qui s'y rattachent (in French). Tournay: Casterman.
- Lindley system
  Lindley (1830). An Introduction to the Natural System of Botany.
  (available online at BHL)
  Lindley (1845). The Vegetable Kingdom.
  (available online at BHL)
- Bentham & Hooker system
  G. Bentham; J.D. Hooker (1862–1883). Genera plantarum ad exemplaria imprimis in herbariis kewensibus servata definita. 3 volumes.
  (available online at Gallica)
- Baillon system
  H. Baillon (1867–1894). Histoire des plantes. 13 volumes.

=== Post Darwinian (Phyletic) ===
- Eichler system
  August W. Eichler (1883). Syllabus der Vorlesungen über Phanerogamenkunde (3rd ed.).
- Van Tieghem system
  Van Tieghem, Philippe Édouard Léon; (1884; 2nd ed., 1891) (1891). Traité de botanique (in French). Paris: Savy.
- Engler system
  A. Engler; K. Prantl & (1887–1915; 2nd edition, 1924–). Die Natürlichen Pflanzenfamilien. W. Engelmann.
  A. Engler (1892). Syllabus der Vorlesungen über specielle und medicinisch-pharmaceutische Botanik [or, in further editions, Syllabus der Pflanzenfamilien].
- Dalla Torre & Harms system
  K.W. von Dalla Torre; H. Harms (1900–1907). Genera Siphonogamarum, ad systema Englerianum conscripta. Lipsiae, G. Engelmann.
- Bessey system
  Charles E. Bessey (1907). "A Synopsis of Plant Phyla". Univ. Nebraska Studies 7: 275–358.
  Charles E. Bessey (1915). "The phylogenetic taxonomy of flowering plants". Annals of the Missouri Botanical Garden. 2 (1/2): 109–164. Bibcode:1915AnMBG...2..109B. doi:10.2307/2990030. JSTOR 2990030.
- Wettstein system
  R. Wettstein; (in two volumes, 1901-1908; 2nd edition, 1911; 3rd edition, 1923-24; 4th edition, 1933–35) (1911). "Handbuch der systematischen Botanik". Nature. 87 (2184): 308. Bibcode:1911Natur..87..308W. doi:10.1038/087308a0. hdl:2027/chi.095529285. S2CID 3965720.
- Rendle system
  Alfred Barton Rendle. The Classification of Flowering Plants 1904, 1925
- Lotsy system
  Johannes Paulus Lotsy. Vorträge über botanische Stammesgeschichte, gehalten an der Reichsuniversität zu Leiden. Ein Lehrbuch der Pflanzensystematik. 1907–1911
- Hallier system
  Hallier, H (1912). "L'origine et le système phylétique des angiospermes exposés à l'aide de leur arbre généalogique". Archives Néerlandaises des Sciences Exactes et Naturelles, Série III. B. 1: 146–234.
- Warming system
  Warming, Eugenius (1912). Frøplanterne (Spermatofyter) (in Danish). Kjøbenhavn: Gyldendalske Boghandel Nordisk Forlag.
- Hutchinson system
  J. Hutchinson; (two volumes, 1926–1934; 2nd edition 1959; 3rd edition, 1973). The families of flowering plants, arranged according to a new system based on their probable phylogeny.
- Calestani system
  Calestani, Vittorio (1933). "Le origini e la classificazione delle Angiosperme". Archo. Bot. Sist. Fito-Geogr. Genet. 9: 274–311.
- Kimura system
  Kimura, Yojiro (1956). "Système et phylogénie des monocotyledones". Notulae Systematicae, Herbier du Muséum de Paris. 15: 137–159.
- Benson system
  Lyman David Benson. Plant Classification 1957
- Emberger system
  Chaudefaud, Marius; Emberger, Louis (1960). Traité de Botanique systématique 2 vols. Paris: Masson.
- Melchior system
  H. Melchior (1964). Adolf Engler (ed.). Syllabus der Pflanzenfamilien (12th edition, II. Band ed.). Berlin-Nikolassee, Gebr. Borntraeger. (also known as modified Engler system, in Angiospermae)
- Takhtajan system
  A. Takhtajan; (in Russian, 1966). A system and phylogeny of the flowering plants.
  A. Takhtajan; (1969, transl. from Russian by C. Jeffrey) (1969). Flowering plants: origin and dispersal. Oliver & Boyd. ISBN 978-0-05-001715-9.
  A. Takhtajan (1980). "Outline of the classification of flowering plants (Magnoliophya)". Botanical Review. 46 (3): 225–359. Bibcode:1980BotRv..46..225T. doi:10.1007/BF02861558. S2CID 30764910.
  A. Takhtajan (1997). Diversity and classification of flowering plants. Columbia University Press. ISBN 978-0-231-10098-4.
- Cronquist system
  A. Cronquist; (1968; 2nd edition 1988) (1988). The evolution and classification of flowering plants. New York Botanical Garden. ISBN 978-0-89327-332-3.
  A. Cronquist (1981). An integrated system of classification of flowering plants. Columbia University Press. ISBN 978-0-231-03880-5.
- Thorne system
  R.F. Thorne (1968). "Synopsis of a putative phylogenetic classification of flowering plants". Aliso. 6 (4): 57–66. doi:10.5642/aliso.19680604.06.
  R.F. Thorne (1983). "Proposed new alignments in the angiosperms". Nord. J. Bot. 3 (1): 85–117. Bibcode:1983NorJB...3...85T. doi:10.1111/j.1756-1051.1983.tb01447.x.
  R.F. Thorne (1992). "Classification and geography of flowering plants". Botanical Review. 58 (3): 225–348. Bibcode:1992BotRv..58..225T. doi:10.1007/BF02858611. S2CID 40348158.
  R.F. Thorne (1992). "An updated phylogenetic classification of the flowering plants". Aliso. 13 (2): 365–389. doi:10.5642/aliso.19921302.08. S2CID 85738663.
  R.F. Thorne (2000). "The classification and geography of the flowering plants: dicotyledons of the class Angiospermae". Botanical Review. 66 (4): 441–647. Bibcode:2000BotRv..66..441T. doi:10.1007/BF02869011. S2CID 43430454.
- Stebbins system
  Stebbins, G.L. (1974). Flowering plants: evolution above the species level. Cambridge, Massachusetts: Harvard University Press, . [System followed by Heywood, V.H. (ed., 1978). Flowering plants of the world. Oxford: Oxford University Press, .]
- Dahlgren system
  R.M.T. Dahlgren (1975). "A system of classification of angiosperms to be used to demonstrate the distribution of characters". Bot. Notiser. 128: 119–147.
  R.M.T. Dahlgren (1980). "A revised system of classification of angiosperms". Bot. J. Linn. Soc. 80 (2): 91–124. doi:10.1111/j.1095-8339.1980.tb01661.x.
  R.M.T. Dahlgren (1983). "General Aspects of Angiosperm Evolution and Macrosystematics". Nordic Journal of Botany. 3 (1): 119–149. Bibcode:1983NorJB...3..119D. doi:10.1111/j.1756-1051.1983.tb01448.x.
  R.M.T. Dahlgren; et al. (1985). The families of the monocotyledons: structure, evolution, and taxonomy. Springer. ISBN 978-0-387-13655-4.
  G. Dahlgren (1989). "An updated Angiosperm Classification". Botanical Journal of the Linnean Society. 100 (3): 197–203. doi:10.1111/j.1095-8339.1989.tb01717.x.
- Goldberg system
  Aaron Goldberg (1986). "Classification, Evolution and Phylogeny of the Families of Dicotyledons". Smithsonian Contributions to Botany. 58 (58): 1–314. doi:10.5479/si.0081024x.58. (available online: Full text (PDF) here) [there is also a comparison among 11 Dicotyledons systems since 1960 until 1985]
  Aaron Goldberg (1989). "Classification, Evolution and Phylogeny of the Families of Monocotyledons". Smithsonian Contributions to Botany. 71 (71): 1–73. doi:10.5479/si.0081024x.71. (available online: Full text (PDF) here)
- Kubitzki system (1990- )
  K. Kubitzki; (1990 ongoing); et al. The Families and Genera of Vascular Plants.
- Shipunov system (1991–)
  (Available online: Full text PDF )
- Reveal system (1997)
  Reveal System of Classification 1997
- Judd system (1999–2016)
  (Modified APG)
  Judd, Walter S. (2008). Plant systematics: a phylogenetic approach (3rd ed.). Sinauer Associates. ISBN 978-0-87893-407-2.
  Judd, Walter S. (2016). Plant systematics: a phylogenetic approach (4th ed.). Sinauer Associates. ISBN 978-1-60535-389-0. Archived from the original on 25 December 2016.
- APG system
  APG I (1998)
  APG (1998). "An ordinal classification for the families of flowering plants". Annals of the Missouri Botanical Garden. 85 (4): 531–553. Bibcode:1998AnMBG..85..531.. doi:10.2307/2992015. JSTOR 2992015.
  W.S. Judd & al.; (1999; 2nd edition, 2002) (2002). Plant systematics: a phylogenetic approach. W.H. Freeman. ISBN 978-0-87893-403-4.
  APG II (2003)
  APG (2003). "An update of the Angiosperm Phylogeny Group classification for the orders and families of flowering plants: APG II". Botanical Journal of the Linnean Society. 141 (4): 399–436. doi:10.1046/j.1095-8339.2003.t01-1-00158.x.
  (Available online: Abstract | Full text (HTML) | Full text (PDF))
  APG III (2009)
  APG (2009). "An update of the Angiosperm Phylogeny Group classification for the orders and families of flowering plants: APG III". Botanical Journal of the Linnean Society. 161 (2): 399–436. doi:10.1111/j.1095-8339.2009.00996.x. hdl:10654/18083.
  (Available online: )
  Chase & Reveal System (2009)
  Chase, Mark W. & Reveal, James L. (2009), "A phylogenetic classification of the land plants to accompany APG III", Botanical Journal of the Linnean Society, 161 (2): 122–127, doi:10.1111/j.1095-8339.2009.01002.x
  (Available online at doi link.)
  APG IV (2016)
  APG IV (2016). "An update of the Angiosperm Phylogeny Group classification for the orders and families of flowering plants: APG IV". Botanical Journal of the Linnean Society. 181 (1): 1–20. doi:10.1111/boj.12385.

== Other systems ==
- Bartling system ()
- Deyl system
- Endlicher system ()
- Fritsch system (algae, )
- Gundersen system
- Hallier system
- Hoek, Mann and Jahns system (algae)
- Mez system
- Novák system ()
- Pascher system (algae, )
- Pteridophyte Phylogeny Group system
- Pulle system
- Rafinesque system ()
- Rouleau system
- Smith system (cryptogams – algae, fungi, bryophytes and pteridophytes)
- Skottsberg system
- Soó system
- Strasburguer system ()
- Tippo system

== Bibliography ==
- Dahlgren, Rolf; Clifford, H. T. (1982). The monocotyledons: A comparative study. London and New York: Academic Press. ISBN 9780122006807.
- Reddy, S.M. (2007), University botany: Angiosperms, plant embryology and plant physiology, New Age International, p. 7, ISBN 978-81-224-1547-6
- Stafleu, Frans A.; Cowan, Richard S. (1976–1988). Taxonomic literature: a selective guide to botanical publications and collections with dates, commentaries and types: Taxon. Lit., ed. 2 (TL2) (2nd ed.). Utrecht: Bohn, Scheltema & Holkema. ISBN 90-313-0224-4.
