= Stebbins system =

System of angiosperm plant classification

The Stebbins system is an angiosperm plants classification drawn up by the American botanist G. Ledyard Stebbins (1906–2000). The system was published in the book Flowering plants: evolution above the species level (1974), and was followed by Vernon Heywood (b. 1927) in his Flowering plants of the world (1978).

== Classification ==
Flowering plants

- Dicotyledons
  - Magnoliidae
  - Hamamelidae
  - Caryophyllidae
  - Dilleniidae
  - Rosidae
  - Asteridae
- Monocotyledons
  - Alismatidae
  - Commelinidae
  - Arecidae
  - Liliidae
