= Eichler system =

System of plant taxonomy

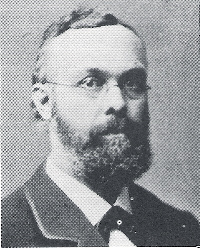
A. W. Eichler

A system of plant taxonomy, the Eichler system was the first phylogenetic (phyletic) or evolutionary system. It was developed by August W. Eichler (1839–1887), initially in his Blüthendiagramme (1875–1878) and then in successive editions of his Syllabus (1876–1890). After his death his colleague Adolf Engler (1844–1930) continued its development, and it became widely accepted.

The system was based on dividing the plant kingdom into those plants with concealed reproductive organs (non-floral), the (Cryptogamae, = hidden reproduction) and those with visible reproductive organs (floral), the (Phanerogamae, = visible reproduction). Moreover, Eichler was the first taxonomist to separate the Phanerogamae into Angiosperms and Gymnosperms and the former into Monocotyledonae and Dicotyledonae. His primary ranks were Divisions (Abtheilung), followed by orders (Reihe).

== Blüthendiagramme (1875–1878) ==
=== Volume I (1875) ===
Contents pp. VI–VIII
Synopsis:

- Division I Gymnospermae p. 54
- Division II Monocotyledoneae p. 73
- Division III Dicotyledoneae p. 187 (part)

=== Volume II (1878) ===
Contents pp. V–VIII
Synopsis:

- Division III Dicotyledoneae p. 187 (continued)

== Syllabus (Fourth edition 1886) ==
The system (here taken from the 4th edition of the Syllabus, 1886) divides plants into divisions, classes and groups. Groups were further divided into orders.

- Note: ranks translated into Latin

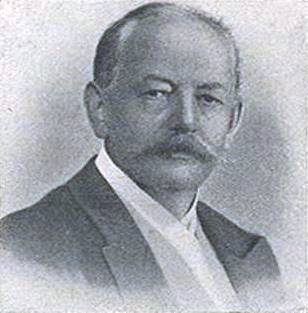
Adolf Engler

German Botanical Ranks
German	Latin	English
Abteilung	divisio	Division
Unterabteilung	subdivisio	Subdivision
Klasse	classis	Class
Reihe	ordo	Order
Unterreihe	subordo	Suborder
Fam.	familia	Family
Unterfam.	subfamilia	Subfamily
Gruppe	tribus	Tribe
Gattung	genus	Genus
Art	species	Species

Outline: p. 6. Page numbers refer to text

- A. Cryptogamae
  division I. Thallophyta
  classis I. Algae
  group I. Cyanophyceae
  group II. Diatomeae
  group III. Chlorophyceae p. 8
  group IV. Phaeophyceae
  group V. Rhodophyceae
  classis II. Fungi
  group I. Schizomycetes
  group II. Eumycetes
  group III. Lichenes
  division II. Bryophyta
  classis I. Hepaticae
  classis II. Musci
  division III. Pteridophyta p. 21
  classis I. Equisetinae
  classis II. Lycopodinae
  classis III. Filicinae
- B. Phanerogamae
  division I. Gymnospermae p. 33
  division II. Angiospermae p. 34
  classis I. Monocotyleae (7 orders) p. 34
  order I. Liliiflorae p. 34
  ordo II. Enantioblastae
  ordo III. Spadiciflorae
  ordo IV. Glumiflorae
  ordo V. Scitamineae
  ordo VI. Gynandreae
  classis II. Dicotyleae p. 39
  subclassis I. Choripetalae
  subclassis II. Sympetalae p. 58

=== Class Monocotyleae ===
- order I. Liliiflorae p. 34 (6 families)
  1. Liliaceae (3 subfamilies)
  a. Lilieae
  Tulipa Gagea Fritillaria Lilium Ornithogalum Allium Hyacinthus Asphodelus Aloë
  b. Melanthieae
  Colchicum Veratrum Tofieldia
  c. Smilaceae
  Paris Convallaria Asparagus Smilax
  2. Amaryllidaceae p. 35
  Galanthus Leucojum Narcissus Agave
  3. Juncaceae p. 35
  4. Iridaceae p. 35
  5. Haemodoraceae p. 35
  6. Dioscoreaceae p. 35
  7. Bromeliaceae p. 35
  ordo II. Enantioblastae p. 35
  ordo III. Spadiciflorae p. 36
  ordo IV. Glumiflorae p. 36
  ordo V. Scitamineae p. 38
  ordo VI. Gynandreae p. 38

== See also ==
- Phylogenetic system

== Bibliography ==
=== Works by Eichler ===
- Eichler, August W. (1875). Blüthendiagramme: construirt und erläutert. 2 vols [Floral diagrams]. Leipzig: W. Engelmann.
  - Volume I: 1875
  - Volume II: 1878
- Syllabus der Vorlesungen über Phanerogamenkunde Lipsius und Tischer, Kiel 1876.
  - Subsequent editions published as Syllabus der Vorlesungen über specielle und medicinisch-pharmaceutische Botanik, 2nd ed. 1880, 3rd ed. 1883, 4th ed. 1886, 5th 1890
    - Eichler, August W. (1880) [1876]. Syllabus der Vorlesungen über specielle und medicinisch-pharmaceutische Botanik (2nd ed.). Berlin: Borntraeger.
    - Eichler, August W. (1883) [1876]. Syllabus der Vorlesungen über specielle und medicinisch-pharmaceutische Botanik (3rd ed.). Berlin: Borntraeger.
      - Outline: p. 1 (Eichler 1883, p. 1)
    - Eichler, August W. (1886) [1876]. Syllabus der Vorlesungen über specielle und medicinisch-pharmaceutische Botanik (4th ed.). Berlin: Borntraeger.
    - Eichler, August W. (1890) [1876]. Syllabus der Vorlesungen über specielle und medicinisch-pharmaceutische Botanik (5th ed.). Berlin: Borntraeger.

=== Other ===
- Oudemans, C.A.J.A. (1896). Rangschikking der Planten. in Oudemans, C.A.J.A. & Hugo de Vries. Leerboek der plantenkunde, ten gebruike bij het hooger onderwijs. volume 2(2).
- Engler, Adolf (1903) [1892]. Syllabus der Pflanzenfamilien : eine Übersicht über das gesamte Pflanzensystem mit Berücksichtigung der Medicinal- und Nutzpflanzen nebst einer Übersicht über die Florenreiche und Florengebiete der Erde zum Gebrauch bei Vorlesungen und Studien über specielle und medicinisch-pharmaceutische Botanik (3rd ed.). Berlin: Gebrüder Borntraeger Verlag. p. 233.
- Lawrence, G. H. M. (1951). Taxonomy of vascular plants.
- Core, Earl Lemley (1955). Plant taxonomy. Prentice-Hall.
- Goldberg, Aaron (1986). "Classification, Evolution and Phylogeny of the Families of Dicotyledons". Smithsonian Contributions to Botany. 58 (58): 1–314. doi:10.5479/si.0081024X.58.
- Sharma, O. P. (2009). Plant Taxonomy (2nd ed.). Tata McGraw-Hill Education. ISBN 9781259081378.
- Stuessy, Tod F. (2009). Plant taxonomy: the systematic evaluation of comparative data (2nd ed.). New York: Columbia University Press. ISBN 978-0-231-51864-2.
