= Archegoniatae =

Archegoniatae was a higher taxonomic term that indicated those embryophytes having a female sexual organ in the form of an archegonium. The term was first introduced by the Russian botanist Ivan Nikolaevich Gorozhankin (1848–1904) in 1876 to indicate a division including bryophytes, pteridophytes and gymnosperms in contrast to the Gynoeciatae (Angiosperms) with a more complex female organ. It has also been used as a general term for mosses (bryophytes) and ferns (pteridophytes), for instance by Douglas Campbell.

In the major post-Darwinian taxonomic systems such as the Engler system it was used to divide the Embryophyta into two divisions, one the Archegoniatae (also called Zoidogamae) containing bryophytes and pteridophytes and the other the Siphonogamae containing the gymnosperms and angiosperms. Campbell indicates that there was both a sensu lato usage which included the gymnosperms, or a sensu stricto usage as in his book, applied only to bryophytes and pteridophytes.

== Bibliography ==
- The Great Soviet Encyclopedia, 3rd Edition (1970-1979). 2010 The Gale Group, Inc.
- Komarov, V. L.; Il'in, M. M., eds. (1986). Flora of the USSR. Vol.1 Archegoniatae and Embryophyta. Nauk SSSR: Botaničeskij Institut Akademii. ISBN 978-3874292214.
- Heinrich Schenck. Ueber die Phylogenie der Archegoniaten und der Characeen. Engler's Botan. Jahrbuch. Bd. XLII., p. 1, 1908).
  - The Phylogeny of the Archegoniatae (Review). W. H. L. New Phytologist Vol. 8, No. 5/6 (Jun. 30, 1909), pp. 234-236
