= Thallophyte =

Polyphyletic group of non-motile, plant-like organisms

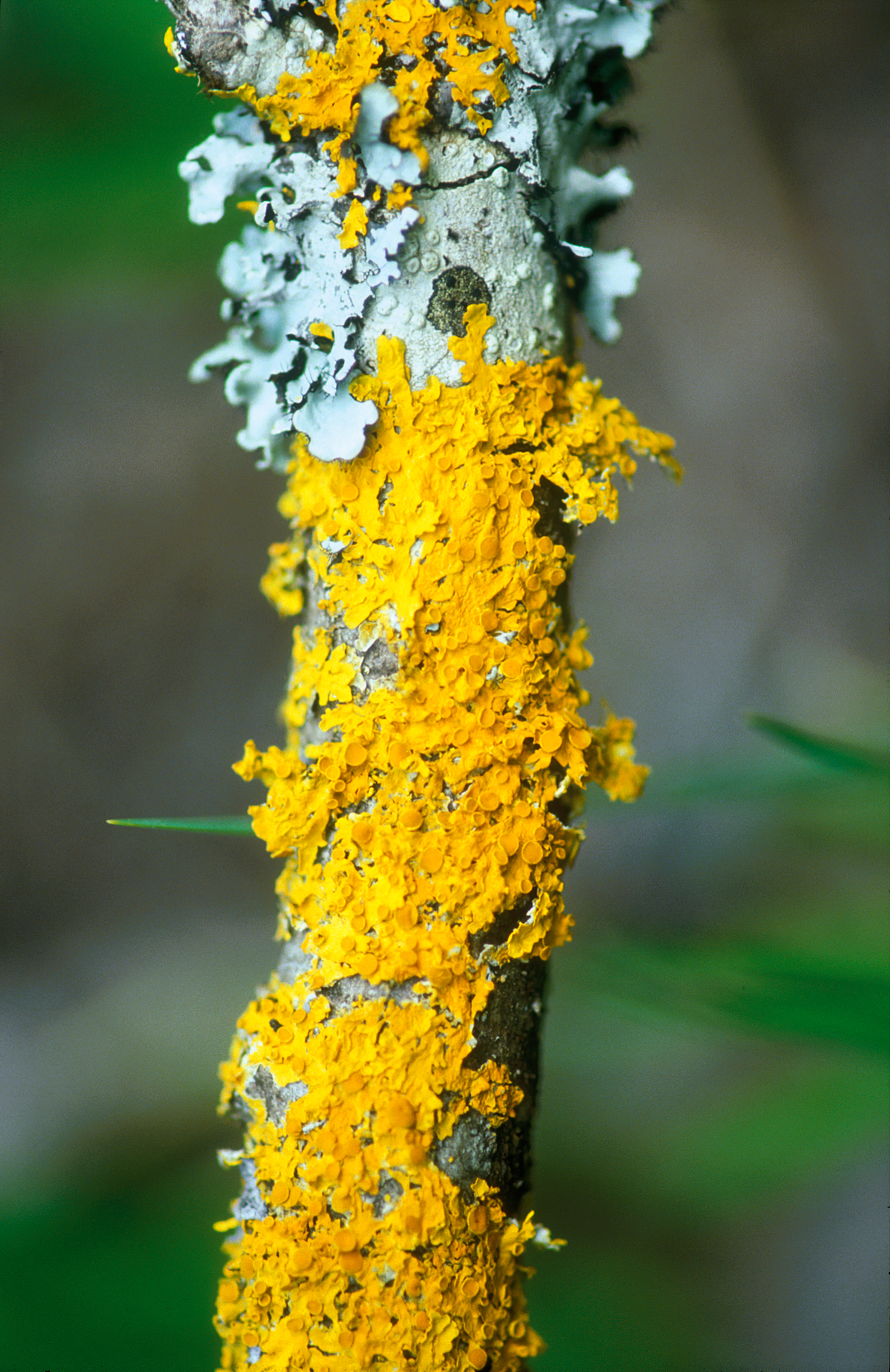
Lichens are some of the organisms included in several definitions of the Thallophyte group.

Thallophytes (Thallophyta or Thallobionta) are a polyphyletic group of non-motile organisms traditionally described as "thalloid plants", "relatively simple plants" or "lower plants". They form a division of kingdom Plantae that include lichens and algae and occasionally bryophytes, bacteria and slime moulds. Thallophytes have a hidden reproductive system and hence they are also incorporated into the similar Cryptogamae category (together with ferns), as opposed to Phanerogamae. Thallophytes are defined by having undifferentiated bodies (thalloid, pseudotissue), as opposed to cormophytes (Cormophyta) with roots and stems. Various groups of thallophytes are major contributors to marine ecosystems.

== Definitions ==
Several different definitions of the group have been used.

Thallophytes (Thallophyta or Thallobionta) are a polyphyletic group of non-mobile organisms traditionally described as "thalloid plants", "relatively simple plants" or "lower plants". Stephan Endlicher, a 19th-century Austrian botanist, separated the vegetable kingdom into the thallophytes (algae, lichens, fungi) and the cormophytes (including bryophytes and thus being equivalent to Embryophyta in this case) in 1836. This definition of Thallophyta is approximately equivalent to Protophyta, which has always been a loosely defined group.

In the Lindley system (1830–1839), Endlicher's cormophytes were divided into the thallogens (including the bryophytes), and cormogens ("non-flowering" plants with roots), as well as the six other classes. Cormogens were a much smaller group than Endlicher's cormophytes, including just the ferns (and Equisetopsida) and the plants now known as lycopodiophytes.

Thallophyta is a division of the plant kingdom including primitive forms of plant life showing a simple plant body. Including unicellular to large algae, fungi, lichens.

The first ten phyla are referred to as thallophytes. They are simple plants without roots stems or leaves.

They are non-embryophyta. These plants grow mainly in water.

== Subdivisions ==
The Thallophyta have been divided into two subdivisions:

- Myxothallophyta (myxomycetes)
- Euthallophyta (bacteria, fungi, lichens, algae)

The term Euthallophyta was originally used by Adolf Engler.

== See also ==
- Bryophyte
- Pteridophyte

== Bibliography ==
- John Lindley (1846). The vegetable kingdom; or, The structure, classification, and uses of plants, illustrated upon the natural system. Bradbury and Evans; The Biodiversity Heritage Library.
- Awasthi, D. K. (2010) [2007]. Diversity of Microbes, Fungi & Lichens (2nd ed.). Meerut: Krishna Prakashan Media.
- Rendle, A.B. (1903). "Notices of Books: Syllabus der Pflanzenfamilien 3rd ed. 1903" (Review). Journal of Botany, British and Foreign. 41: 62–63.
