= Karl Anton Eugen Prantl =

German botanist (1849–1893)

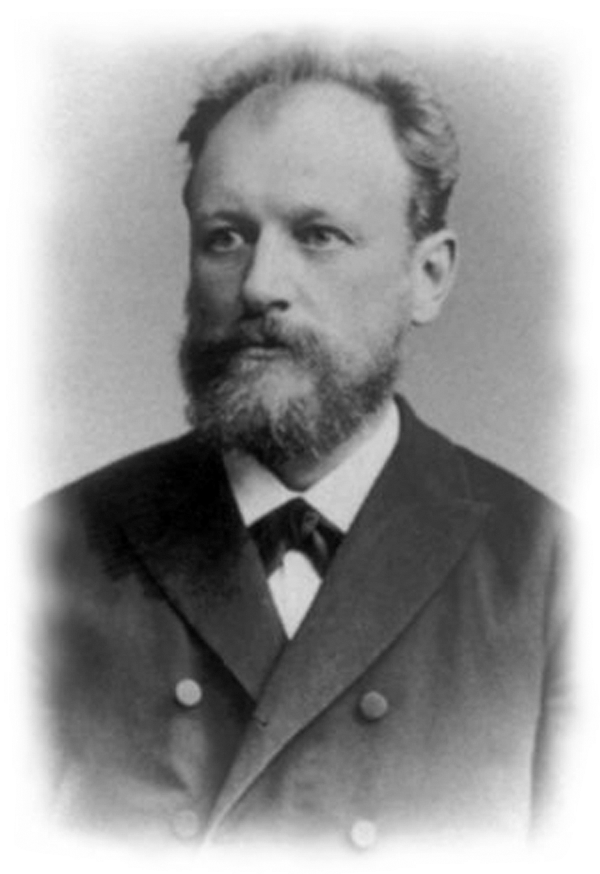
- Born: 10 September 1849; Munich, Kingdom of Bavaria
- Died: 24 February 1893 (aged 43); Breslau
- Scientific career
- Fields: Botany

Karl Anton Eugen Prantl (10 September 1849 – 24 February 1893), also known as Carl Anton Eugen Prantl, was a German botanist.

Prantl was born in Munich, Kingdom of Bavaria, and studied at the Ludwig-Maximilians-Universität München. In 1870, he graduated with the dissertation Das Inulin. Ein Beitrag zur Pflanzenphysiologie (The inulin, a contribution to the plant physiology). He worked with Carl Wilhelm von Nägeli and Julius Sachs. From 1887 on, he published Die Natürlichen Pflanzenfamilien (The Natural Plant Families) with fellow botanist Adolf Engler, who completed the work in 1915.

In 1877, he became a professor at the forest educational institution at Aschaffenburg, transferring to the University of Breslau in 1889, where he also became director of the botanical garden there. Prantl worked particularly on Cryptogams.

== Works ==
- Lehrbuch der Botanik (Textbook of Botany), 7 Eds., Leipzig 1887. English translation: An elementary textbook of botany 1881
- Untersuchungen zur Morphologie der Gefäßkryptogamen (Studies on morphology of the Vascular Cryptogams), Leipzig 1875 and 1881, 2 fascicles.
- Exkursionsflora für das Königreich Bayern (Flora of the excursion to the Bavaria kingdom), Stuttgart, 1884.
- Karl Prantl and Adolf Engler (editors): Die natürlichen Pflanzenfamilien (The natural plant families), 2 Editions, Leipzig (since 1887).
