= Scitamineae =

Order of plants

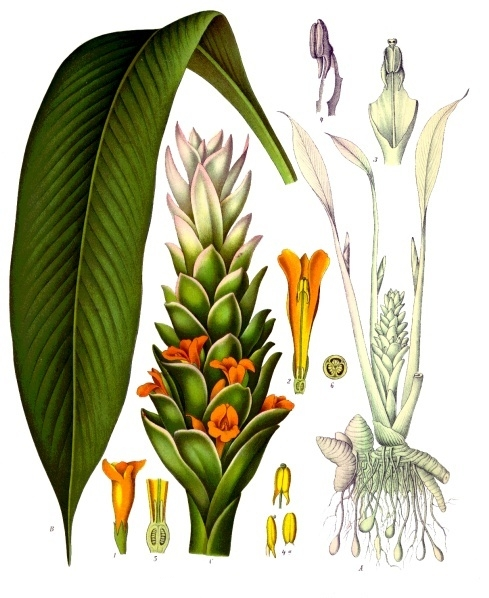
Curcuma longa (turmeric), a member of the Zingiberaceae

Scitamineae is a descriptive botanical name. Historically it has been applied to a remarkably stable group of flowering plants, now referred to as Zingiberales:

- at the rank of family in the Bentham & Hooker system (volume of 1883), placed in order Epigynae in the Monocotyledones
- at the rank of order in the Wettstein system and Engler system.

In the Wettstein system, last revised in 1935, it was circumscribed:

- order Scitamineae
  family Musaceae
  family Zingiberaceae
  family Cannaceae
  family Marantaceae

In the Engler system, update of 1964, it was circumscribed:

- order Scitamineae
  family Musaceae
  family Zingiberaceae
  family Cannaceae
  family Marantaceae
  family Lowiaceae

The Cronquist system, of 1981, also treats the plants so united as a unit, also at the rank of order, but by splitting has increased the number of families to eight, in total). However, the order is named Zingiberales and is placed in subclass Zingiberidae, which in its turn belongs to the class Liliopsida [=monocotyledons].

The APG II system, of 2003 (unchanged from the APG system, 1998), recognises this same order Zingiberales (with the same eight families) but assigns it to the clade commelinids in the monocots.

== Bibliography ==
- Tomlinson, P. B. (1 January 1962). "Phylogeny of the Scitamineae - Morphological and Anatomical Considerations". Evolution. 16 (2): 192–213. doi:10.2307/2406197. JSTOR 2406197.
