= Thorne system =

Plant taxonomy system

A system of plant taxonomy, the Thorne system of plant classification was devised by the American botanist Robert F. Thorne (1920–2015) in 1968, and he continued to issue revisions over many years (1968–2007).

Some versions of the system are available online. The Bioinformatics Working Group Center for the Study of Digital Libraries at Texas A&M University lists the March 1999 version (and other classification systems). James Reveal's course lecture notes (1999) also gives an account of the Thorne system at that time, with an extensive listing of synonyms, both nomenclatural and taxonomic, for each name in the system together with several other classification systems.

For a discussion of the various suffixes used for superorders (-florae vs. -anae), see Brummitt 1992, and Thorne 1992. In this latter paper, Thorne sets out his reasons for abandoning -florae for -anae, following contemporary practice.

== 1968 System ==
=== Monocotyledons ===
Superorders

- Superorder Alimatiflorae
- Superorder Triuridiflorae
- Superorder Liliiflorae
  Order Liliales
- Superorder Ariflorae
- Superorder Commeliniflorae

== 1992 System ==
The 1992 system lists 69 orders and 440 families

=== Summary ===
- Class Magnoliopsida [= angiosperms ]
  Subclass Magnoliidae [= dicotyledons ]
  Superorder Magnolianae
  Superorder Nymphaeanae
  Superorder Rafflesianae
  Superorder Caryophyllanae
  Superorder Theanae
  Superorder Celastranae
  Superorder Malvanae
  Superorder Violanae
  Superorder Santalanae
  Superorder Geranianae
  Superorder Rutanae
  Superorder Proteanae
  Superorder Rosanae
  Superorder Cornanae
  Superorder Asteranae
  Superorder Solananae
  Superorder Loasanae
  Superorder Myrtanae
  Superorder Gentiananae
  Subclass Liliidae [= monocotyledons ]
  Superorder Lilianae
  Superorder Hydatellanae
  Superorder Triuridanae
  Superorder Alismatanae
  Superorder Aranae
  Superorder Cyclanthanae
  Superorder Pandananae
  Superorder Arecanae
  Superorder Commelinanae

=== Magnoliidae ===
- Subclass Magnoliidae [= dicotyledons ]
  Superorder Magnolianae
  Order Magnoliales
  Family Winteraceae
  Family Illiciaceae
  Family Schisandraceae
  Family Magnoliaceae
  Family Degeneriaceae
  Family Himantandraceae
  Family Eupomatiaceae
  Family Annonaceae
  Family Aristolochiaceae
  Family Myristicaceae
  Family Canellaceae
  Family Austrobaileyaceae
  Family Amborellaceae
  Family Trimeniaceae
  Family Chloranthaceae
  Family Monimiaceae
  Family Gomortegaceae
  Family Calycanthaceae
  Family Lauraceae
  Family Hernandiaceae
  Family Lactoridaceae
  Family Saururaceae
  Family Piperaceae
  Order Ceratophyllales
  Family Ceratophyllaceae
  Order Nelumbonales
  Family Nelumbonaceae
  Order Paeoniales
  Family Paeoniaceae
  Family Glaucidiaceae
  Order Berberidales
  Family Menispermaceae
  Family Lardizabalaceae
  Family Sargentodoxaceae
  Family Berberidaceae
  Family Hydrastidaceae
  Family Ranunculaceae
  Family Circaeasteraceae
  Family Papaveraceae
  Superorder Nymphaeanae
  Order Nymphaeales
  Family Cabombaceae
  Family Nymphaeaceae
  Superorder Rafflesianae
  Order Rafflesiales
  Family Hydnoraceae
  Family Rafflesiaceae
  Superorder Caryophyllanae
  Order Caryophyllales
  Family Caryophyllaceae
  Family Portulacaceae
  Family Hectorellaceae
  Family Basellaceae
  Family Didiereaceae
  Family Cactaceae
  Family Phytolaccaceae
  Family Petiveriaceae
  Family Agdestidaceae
  Family Barbeuiaceae
  Family Achatocarpaceae
  Family Stegnospermataceae
  Family Nyctaginaceae
  Family Aizoaceae
  Family Halophytaceae
  Family Molluginaceae
  Family Chenopodiaceae
  Family Amaranthaceae
  Superorder Theanae
  Order Theales
  Family Dilleniaceae
  Family Actinidiaceae
  Family Paracryphiaceae
  Family Stachyuraceae
  Family Theaceae
  Family Asteropeiaceae
  Family Tetrameristaceae
  Family Pellicieraceae
  Family Chrysobalanaceae
  Family Symplocaceae
  Family Caryocaraceae
  Family Marcgraviaceae
  Family Oncothecaceae
  Family Aquifoliaceae
  Family Phellinaceae
  Family Sphenostemonaceae
  Family Sarraceniaceae
  Family Pentaphylacaceae
  Family Clethraceae
  Family Cyrillaceae
  Family Ochnaceae
  Family Quiinaceae
  Family Scytopetalaceae
  Family Medusagynaceae
  Family Strasburgeriaceae
  Family Ancistrocladaceae
  Family Dioncophyllaceae
  Family Nepenthaceae
  Family Bonnetiaceae
  Family Clusiaceae
  Family Elatinaceae
  Family Lecythidaceae
  Order Ericales
  Family Ericaceae
  Family Epacridaceae
  Family Empetraceae
  Order Fouquieriales
  Family Fouquieriaceae
  Order Styracales
  Family Ebenaceae
  Family Lissocarpaceae
  Family Sapotaceae
  Family Styracaceae
  Order Primulales
  Family Theophrastaceae
  Family Myrsinaceae
  Family Primulaceae
  Family Plumbaginaceae
  Order Polygonales
  Family Polygonaceae
  Superorder Celastranae
  Order Celastrales
  Family Celastraceae
  Family Goupiaceae
  Family Lophopyxidaceae
  Family Stackhousiaceae
  Family Corynocarpaceae
  Superorder Malvanae
  Order Malvales
  Family Sterculiaceae
  Family Huaceae
  Family Elaeocarpaceae
  Family Plagiopteraceae
  Family Tiliaceae
  Family Monotaceae
  Family Dipterocarpaceae
  Family Sarcolaenaceae
  Family Sphaerosepalaceae
  Family Bombacaceae
  Family Malvaceae
  Order Urticales
  Family Ulmaceae
  Family Moraceae
  Family Cecropiaceae
  Family Barbeyaceae
  Family Urticaceae
  Family Cannabaceae
  Order Rhamnales
  Family Rhamnaceae
  Family Elaeagnaceae
  Order Euphorbiales
  Family Euphorbiaceae
  Family Aextoxicaceae
  Family Simmondsiaceae
  Family Dichapetalaceae
  Family Gonystylaceae
  Family Thymelaeaceae
  Superorder Violanae
  Order Violales
  Family Bixaceae
  Family Cochlospermaceae
  Family Cistaceae
  Family Violaceae
  Family Flacourtiaceae
  Family Physenaceae
  Family Lacistemataceae
  Family Salicaceae
  Family Dipentodontaceae
  Family Peridiscaceae
  Family Scyphostegiaceae
  Family Passifloraceae
  Family Turneriaceae
  Family Malesherbiaceae
  Family Achariaceae
  Family Caricaceae
  Family Tamaricaceae
  Family Frankeniaceae
  Family Cucurbitaceae
  Family Begoniaceae
  Family Datiscaceae
  Order Brassicales
  Family Resedaceae
  Family Capparaceae
  Family Brassicaceae
  Family Salvadoraceae
  Family Gyrostemonaceae
  Order Batales
  Family Bataceae
  Superorder Santalanae
  Order Santalales
  Family Olacaceae
  Family Opiliaceae
  Family Medusandraceae
  Family Santalaceae
  Family Misodendraceae
  Family Loranthaceae
  Family Eremolepidaceae
  Family Viscaceae
  Order Balanophorales
  Family Balanophoraceae
  Family Cynomoriaceae
  Superorder Geranianae
  Order Linales
  Family Humiriaceae
  Family Ctenolophonaceae
  Family Hugoniaceae
  Family Ixonanthaceae
  Family Linaceae
  Family Erythroxylaceae
  Family Zygophyllaceae
  Family Balanitaceae
  Order Rhizophorales
  Family Rhizophoraceae
  Order Geraniales
  Family Oxalidaceae
  Family Geraniaceae
  Family Balsaminaceae
  Family Tropaeolaceae
  Family Limnanthaceae
  Order Polygalales
  Family Malpighiaceae
  Family Trigoniaceae
  Family Vochysiaceae
  Family Polygalaceae
  Family Krameriaceae
  Superorder Rutanae
  Order Rutales
  Family Rutaceae
  Family Rhabdodendraceae
  Family Cneoraceae
  Family Simaroubaceae
  Family Picramniaceae
  Family Ptaeroxylaceae
  Family Meliaceae
  Family Burseraceae
  Family Anacardiaceae
  Family Leitneriaceae
  Family Tepuianthaceae
  Family Coriariaceae
  Family Sapindaceae
  Family Sabiaceae
  Family Melianthaceae
  Family Akaniaceae
  Family Bretschneideraceae
  Family Moringaceae
  Family Surianaceae
  Family Connaraceae
  Family Fabaceae
  Superorder Proteanae
  Order Proteales
  Family Proteaceae
  Superorder Rosanae
  Order Hamamelidales
  Family Trochodendraceae
  Family Eupteleaceae
  Family Cercidiphyllaceae
  Family Platanaceae
  Family Hamamelidaceae
  Order Casuarinales
  Family Casuarinaceae
  Order Balanopales
  Family Buxaceae
  Family Didymelaceae
  Family Daphniphyllaceae
  Family Balanopaceae
  Order Bruniales
  Family Roridulaceae
  Family Bruniaceae
  Family Geissolomataceae
  Family Grubbiaceae
  Family Myrothamnaceae
  Family Hydrostachyaceae
  Order Juglandales
  Family Rhoipteleaceae
  Family Juglandaceae
  Family Myricaceae
  Order Betulales
  Family Ticodendraceae
  Family Betulaceae
  Family Nothofagaceae
  Family Fagaceae
  Order Rosales
  Family Rosaceae
  Family Neuradaceae
  Family Crossosomataceae
  Family Anisophylleaceae
  Order Saxifragales
  Family Tetracarpaeaceae
  Family Crassulaceae
  Family Cephalotaceae
  Family Penthoraceae
  Family Saxifragaceae
  Family Francoaceae
  Family Grossulariaceae
  Family Vahliaceae
  Family Eremosynaceae
  Family Lepuropetalaceae
  Family Parnassiaceae
  Family Stylidiaceae
  Family Droseraceae
  Family Greyiaceae
  Family Diapensiaceae
  Order Podostemales
  Family Podostemaceae
  Order Cunoniales
  Family Cunoniaceae
  Family Davidsoniaceae
  Family Staphyleaceae
  Superorder Cornanae
  Order Hydrangeales
  Family Hydrangeaceae
  Family Escalloniaceae
  Family Carpodetaceae
  Family Griseliniaceae
  Family Alseuosmiaceae
  Family Montiniaceae
  Family Brexiaceae
  Family Columelliaceae
  Family Desfontainiaceae
  Order Cornales
  Family Vitaceae
  Family Gunneraceae
  Family Haloragaceae
  Family Cornaceae
  Family Curtisiaceae
  Family Alangiaceae
  Family Garryaceae
  Family Aucubaceae
  Family Aralidiaceae
  Family Eucommiaceae
  Family Icacinaceae
  Family Metteniusaceae
  Family Cardiopteridaceae
  Family Peripterygiaceae
  Order Pittosporales
  Family Pittosporaceae
  Family Byblidaceae
  Family Tremandraceae
  Order Araliales
  Family Helwingiaceae
  Family Torricelliaceae
  Family Araliaceae
  Family Hydrocotylaceae
  Family Apiaceae
  Order Dipsacales
  Family Caprifoliaceae
  Family Adoxaceae
  Family Valerianaceae
  Family Triplostegiaceae
  Family Dipsacaceae
  Family Morinaceae
  Superorder Asteranae
  Order Asterales
  Family Calyceraceae
  Family Asteraceae
  Order Campanulales
  Family Menyanthaceae
  Family Pentaphragmataceae
  Family Sphenocleaceae
  Family Campanulaceae
  Family Goodeniaceae
  Superorder Solananae
  Order Solanales
  Family Solanaceae
  Family Duckeodendraceae
  Family Goetzeaceae
  Family Nolanaceae
  Family Convolvulaceae
  Family Hydrophyllaceae
  Family Boraginaceae
  Family Hoplestigmataceae
  Family Lennoaceae
  Family Tetrachondraceae
  Family Polemoniaceae
  Superorder Loasanae
  Order Loasales
  Family Loasaceae
  Superorder Myrtanae
  Order Myrtales
  Family Lythraceae
  Family Alzateaceae
  Family Rhynchocalycaceae
  Family Penaeaceae
  Family Oliniaceae
  Family Trapaceae
  Family Crypteroniaceae
  Family Melastomataceae
  Family Combretaceae
  Family Onagraceae
  Family Myrtaceae
  Superorder Gentiananae
  Order Gentianales
  Family Loganiaceae
  Family Rubiaceae
  Family Dialypetalanthaceae
  Family Apocynaceae
  Family Gentianaceae
  Family Saccifoliaceae
  Order Scrophulariales
  Family Oleaceae
  Family Buddlejaceae
  Family Stilbaceae
  Family Bignoniaceae
  Family Pedaliaceae
  Family Martyniaceae
  Family Myoporaceae
  Family Scrophulariaceae
  Family Gesneriaceae
  Family Globulariaceae
  Family Plantaginaceae
  Family Lentibulariaceae
  Family Acanthaceae
  Family Callitrichaceae
  Family Hippuridaceae
  Family Verbenaceae
  Family Phrymaceae
  Family Symphoremataceae
  Family Nesogenaceae
  Family Avicenniaceae
  Family Lamiaceae

=== Liliidae ===
- Subclass Liliidae [= monocotyledons ]
  Superorder Lilianae
  Order Liliales
  Family Melanthiaceae
  Family Campynemataceae
  Family Alstroemeriaceae
  Family Colchicaceae
  Family Liliaceae
  Family Trilliaceae
  Family Iridaceae
  Order Burmanniales
  Family Burmanniaceae
  Family Corsiaceae
  Order Asparagales
  Family Asparagaceae
  Family Luzuriagaceae
  Family Asphodelaceae
  Family Aphyllanthaceae
  Family Phormiaceae
  Family Tecophilaeaceae
  Family Lanariaceae
  Family Hemerocallidaceae
  Family Asteliaceae
  Family Hanguanaceae
  Family Agavaceae
  Family Hostaceae
  Family Blandfordiaceae
  Family Dasypogonaceae
  Family Xanthorrhoeaceae
  Family Ixioliriaceae
  Family Hyacinthaceae
  Family Alliaceae
  Family Amaryllidaceae
  Family Hypoxidaceae
  Family Velloziaceae
  Family Cyanastraceae
  Family Eriospermaceae
  Order Dioscoreales
  Family Philesiaceae
  Family Ripogonaceae
  Family Petermanniaceae
  Family Smilacaceae
  Family Dioscoreaceae
  Family Trichopodaceae
  Family Stemonaceae
  Family Taccaceae
  Order Orchidales
  Family Orchidaceae
  Superorder Hydatellanae
  Order Hydatellales
  Family Hydatellaceae
  Superorder Triuridanae
  Order Triuridales
  Family Triuridaceae
  Superorder Alismatanae
  Order Alismatales
  Family Butomaceae
  Family Alismataceae
  Family Hydrocharitaceae
  Order Potamogetonales
  Family Aponogetonaceae
  Family Scheuchzeriaceae
  Family Juncaginaceae
  Family Potamogetonaceae
  Family Posidoniaceae
  Family Cymodoceaceae
  Family Zannichelliaceae
  Family Zosteraceae
  Superorder Aranae
  Order Acorales
  Family Acoraceae
  Order Arales
  Family Araceae
  Family Lemnaceae
  Superorder Cyclanthanae
  Order Cyclanthales
  Family Cyclanthaceae
  Superorder Pandananae
  Order Pandanales
  Family Pandanaceae
  Superorder Arecanae
  Order Arecales
  Family Arecaceae
  Superorder Commelinanae
  Order Bromeliales
  Family Bromeliaceae
  Order Philydrales
  Family Philydraceae
  Family Pontederiaceae
  Family Haemodoraceae
  Order Typhales
  Family Typhaceae
  Order Zingiberales
  Family Musaceae
  Family Strelitziaceae
  Family Lowiaceae
  Family Heliconiaceae
  Family Zingiberaceae
  Family Costaceae
  Family Cannaceae
  Family Marantaceae
  Order Commelinales
  Family Rapateaceae
  Family Xyridaceae
  Family Commelinaceae
  Family Mayacaceae
  Family Eriocaulaceae
  Order Juncales
  Family Thurniaceae
  Family Juncaceae
  Family Cyperaceae
  Order Poales
  Family Flagellariaceae
  Family Joinvilleaceae
  Family Restionaceae
  Family Ecdeiocoleaceae
  Family Centrolepidaceae
  Family Poaceae

== 2007 System ==
The 2007 system lists 12 subclasses, 35 superorders, 87 orders, 40 suborders, and 472 families. It uses the suffixes given in the following example.

Class Magnoliopsida ("Angiospermae") - 12 subclasses

- Subclass Magnoliidae
  - Superorder: Magnolianae
    - Order: Magnoliales
      - SubOrder: Magnoliineae
        - Family: Magnoliaceae
          - SubFamily: Magnolioideae
            - Tribe: Magnolieae

Subclasses (12)

- 1. Chloranthidae
- 2. Magnoliidae [= dicotyledons]
- 3. Alismatidae
- 4. Liliidae - 3 superorders
  - Pandananae
  - Dioscoreanae
  - Lilianae - 3 orders
    - Liliales - 12 families
      - Corsiaceae Becc., 1878
      - Campynemataceae Dumort., 1829
      - Melanthiaceae Batsch ex Borkh., 1797
      - Trilliaceae Chevall., 1827
      - Petermanniaceae Hutch., 1934
      - Luzuriagaceae Lotsy, 1911 (incl. Drymophila R. Br.)
      - Alstroemeriaceae Dumort., 1829
      - Colchicaceae DC., 1804
      - Rhipogonaceae Conran & Clifford, 1985
      - Philesiaceae Dumort., 1829
      - Smilacaceae Vent., 1799
      - Liliaceae Juss., 1789
    - Orchidales
    - Iridales
- 5. Commelinidae
- 6. Ranunculidae
- 7. Hamamelididae
- 8. Caryophyllidae
- 9. Rosidae
- 10. Malvidae
- 11. Asteridae
- 12. Lamiidae

Note: Monocotyledons are represented here by 3 separate subclasses 3–5

== Bibliography ==
- Reveal, James (22 November 1998). "Lists of the Flowering Plant Taxa Accepted by Cronquist, Dahlgren, Reveal, Takhtajan & Thorne". Vascular Plant Family Nomenclature. University of Maryland: Norton-Brown Herbarium.
- Reveal, James L (29 March 1999a). "An updated classification of the Monocotyledoneae by Robert F Thorne". Plant Biology. University of Maryland: Norton-Brown Herbarium.
- Reveal, James L (1999b). "Thorne System of Angiosperm Classification". Plant systematics.org. University of Maryland: Norton-Brown Herbarium.
- Reveal, James L (1999c). "PBIO250 Lecture Notes. Plant Taxonomy: Systems of Vascular Plant Classification". Plant systematics.org. University of Maryland: Norton-Brown Herbarium.
- Brummitt, R.K. (1992). Vascular plant families and genera : a listing of the genera of vascular plants of the world according to their families, as recognised in the Kew Herbarium, with an analysis of relationships of the flowering plant families according to eight systems of classification. Kew: Royal Botanic Gardens. ISBN 9780947643430.
- Singh, Gurcharan (2019) [2004]. Plant Systematics: An Integrated Approach (4th ed.). CRC Press. ISBN 978-1-00-057677-1.

=== Works by Thorne ===
- Thorne, R.F. (1968). "Synopsis of a putative phylogenetic classification of flowering plants". Aliso. 6 (4): 57–66. doi:10.5642/aliso.19680604.06.
- Thorne, Robert F (1976). "A Phylogenetic Classification of the Angiospermae". In Hecht, M.K.; Steere, W.C.; Wallace, B. (eds.). Evolutionary Biology. Vol. 9. Springer. pp. 35–106. doi:10.1007/978-1-4615-6950-3_2. ISBN 978-1-4615-6952-7. LCCN 67-11961.
- Thorne, Robert F (1977). "Some Realignments in the Angiospermae". In Kubitzki, Klaus (ed.). Flowering Plants: Evolution and Classification of Higher Categories Symposium, Hamburg, September 8–12, 1976. Plant Systematics and Evolution. Vol. Supplement 1. Vienna: Springer. pp. 299–319. doi:10.1007/978-3-7091-7076-2_19. ISBN 978-3-211-81434-5.
- Thorne, Robert F. (February 1983). "Proposed new realignments in the angiosperms". Nordic Journal of Botany. 3 (1): 85–117. Bibcode:1983NorJB...3...85T. doi:10.1111/j.1756-1051.1983.tb01447.x.
- Thorne, Robert F (1992a). "Classification and geography of flowering plants". Botanical Review. 58 (3): 225–348. Bibcode:1992BotRv..58..225T. doi:10.1007/BF02858611. S2CID 40348158.
- Thorne, Robert F (1992b). "An updated phylogenetic classification of the flowering plants". Aliso. 13 (2): 365–389. doi:10.5642/aliso.19921302.08.
- Thorne, Robert F (2000). "The classification and geography of the flowering plants: dicotyledons of the class Angiospermae". Botanical Review. 66 (4): 441–647. Bibcode:2000BotRv..66..441T. doi:10.1007/BF02869011. S2CID 43430454.
- Thorne, Robert F.; Reveal, James L. (April 2007). "An Updated Classification of the Class Magnoliopsida ("Angiospermae")". The Botanical Review. 73 (2): 67–181. doi:10.1663/0006-8101(2007)73[67:AUCOTC]2.0.CO;2. S2CID 24415895.
