= Liliopsida =

Class of flowering plants

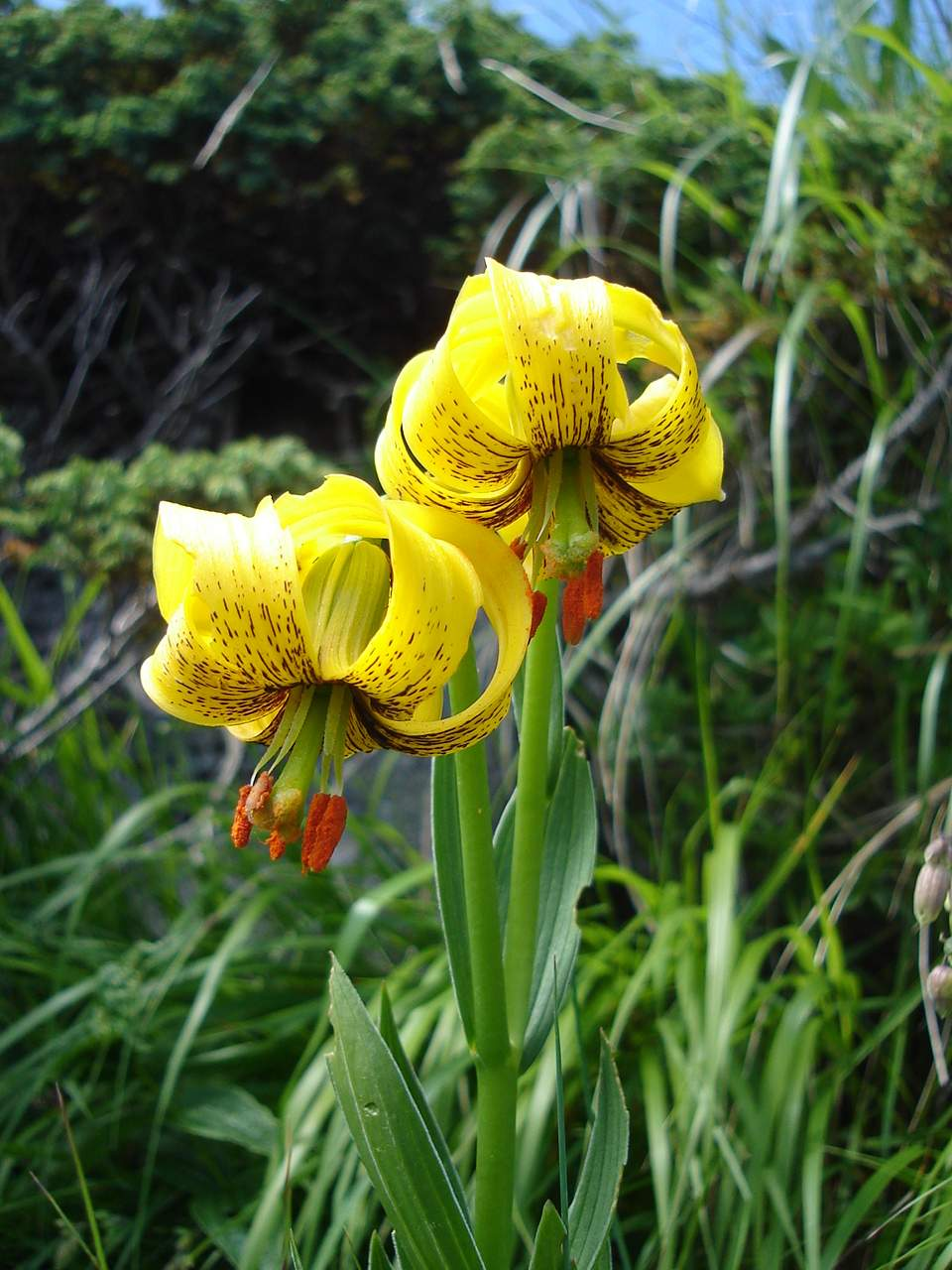
Lilium jankae

Liliopsida Batsch (synonym: Liliatae) is a botanical name for the class containing the family Liliaceae (or lily family). It is considered synonymous (or nearly synonymous) with the name monocotyledon. Publication of the name is credited to Scopoli (in 1760): see author citation (botany). This name is formed by replacing the termination -aceae in the name Liliaceae by the termination -opsida (Art 16 of the ICBN).

Although in principle it is true that circumscription of this class will vary with the taxonomic system being used, in practice this name is very strongly linked to the Cronquist system, and the allied Takhtajan system. These two are the only major systems to use the name, and in both these systems it refers to the group more widely known as the monocotyledons. Earlier systems referred to this group by the name Monocotyledones, with Monocotyledoneae an earlier spelling (these names may be used in any rank). Systems such as the Dahlgren and Thorne systems (more recent than the Takhtajan and Cronquist systems) refer to this group by the name Liliidae (a name in the rank of subclass). Modern systems, such as the APG and APG II systems refer to this group by the name monocots (a name for a clade). Therefore, in practice the name Liliopsida will almost surely refer to the usage as in the Cronquist system.

In summary the monocotyledons were named:

- Monocotyledoneae in the de Candolle system and the Engler system.
- Monocotyledones in the Bentham & Hooker system and the Wettstein system
- class Liliatae and later Liliopsida in the Takhtajan
- class Liliopsida in the Cronquist system (also in the Reveal system).
- subclass Liliidae in the Dahlgren system and the Thorne system (1992)
- clade monocots in the APG system, the APG II system and the APG III system.

Each of the systems mentioned above use their own internal taxonomy for the group.

== Liliopsida in the Takhtajan system ==
The Takhtajan system used this internal taxonomy:

- class Liliopsida [ = monocotyledons]
  subclass Liliidae
  superorder Lilianae
  superorder Dioscoreanae
  subclass Commelinidae
  superorder Bromelianae
  superorder Pontederianae
  superorder Zingiberanae
  superorder Commelinanae
  superorder Hydatellanae
  superorder Juncanae
  superorder Poaceae
  subclass Arecidae
  superorder Arecanae
  subclass Alismatidae
  superorder Alismatanae
  subclass Triurididae
  superorder Triuridanae
  subclass Aridae'
  superorder Aranae
  superorder Cyclanthanae
  superorder Pandananae
  superorder Typhanae

== Liliopsida in the Cronquist system ==
The internal taxonomy in the Cronquist system is:

- class Liliopsida [ = monocotyledons]
  subclass Alismatidae
  order Cyclanthales
  order Arales
  subclass Commelinidae
  order Commelinales
  order Eriocaulales
  order Restionales
  order Juncales
  order Cyperales
  order Hydatellales
  order Typhales
  subclass Zingiberidae
  order Bromeliales
  order Zingiberales
  subclass Liliidae
  order Liliales
  order Orchidales

== Liliopsida in the Reveal system ==
The internal taxonomy in the Reveal system is:

- class 3. Liliopsida
  subclass 1. Alismatidae
  superorder 1. Butomanae
  superorder 2. Alismatanae
  subclass 2. Triurididae
  subclass 3. Aridae
  superorder 1. Acoranae
  superorder 2. Aranaea
  superorder 3. Cyclanthanae
  superorder 4. Pandananae
  subclass 4. Liliidae
  subclass 5. Arecidae
  superorder 1. Arecanae
  subclass 6. Commelinidae
  superorder 1. Bromelianae
  superorder 2. Pontederianae
  superorder 3. Commelinanae
  superorder 4. Hydatellanae
  superorder 5. Typhanae
  superorder 6. Juncanae
  subclass 7. Zingiberidae
  superorder 1. Zingiberanae

== Bibliography ==
- Clifford, H. T. (1977). Quantitative studies of inter-relationships amongst the Liliatae. pp. 77–96. in Kubitzki (1977)
- Takhtajan, Armen Leonovich (1966). "Lilianae". Система и филогения цветкорых растений (Sistema i filogeniia tsvetkovykh rastenii) [Systema et Phylogemia Magnoliophytorum] (in Russian). trans. C Jeffrey, as Flowering plants: Origin and dispersal, Edinburgh : Oliver and Boyd, 1969. Moscow: Наука. p. 473. ISBN 978-0-05-001715-9.
- A. Takhtajan (1980). "Outline of the classification of flowering plants (Magnoliophya)". Botanical Review. 46 (3): 225–359. Bibcode:1980BotRv..46..225T. doi:10.1007/BF02861558. S2CID 30764910.
- Takhtajan, Armen Leonovich (2009). Flowering Plants. Springer. ISBN 978-1-4020-9609-9.
- Singh, Gurcharan (2004). "Armen Takhtajan". Plant Systematics: An Integrated Approach. Science Publishers. pp. 269–277. ISBN 978-1-57808-351-0.
- Takhtajan, Armen (1991). Evolutionary trends in flowering plants. New York: Columbia Univ. Press. ISBN 9780231073288.
- Kubitzki, Klaus, ed. (1977). Flowering Plants : Evolution and classification of higher categories. Symposium, Hamburg, September 8–12, 1976. Plant Systematics & Evolution - Supplementum 1. Wien: Springer. p. 416. ISBN 9783211814345.
