= Plant taxonomy =

Scientific study of identifying, classifying, describing, and naming plants

Plant taxonomy is the science that finds, identifies, describes, classifies, and names plants. It is one of the main branches of taxonomy—the science that finds, describes, classifies, and names living organisms.

Plant taxonomy is closely allied to plant systematics, and there is no sharp boundary between the two. In practice, "plant systematics" involves relationships between plants and their evolution, especially at the higher levels, whereas "plant taxonomy" deals with the actual handling of plant specimens.The precise relationship between taxonomy and systematics, however, has changed along with the goals and methods employed.

Plant taxonomy is well known for being turbulent, and traditionally not having any close agreement on circumscription and placement of taxa. See the list of systems of plant taxonomy.

== Background ==
Classification systems serve the purpose of grouping organisms by characteristics common to each group. Plants are distinguished from animals by various traits: they have cell walls made of cellulose, polyploidy, and they exhibit sedentary growth. Where animals have to eat organic molecules, plants are able to change energy from light into organic energy by the process of photosynthesis. The basic unit of classification is species, a group able to breed amongst themselves and bearing mutual resemblance, a broader classification is the genus. Several genera make up a family, and several families an order.

=== History of classification ===
The botanical term angiosperm, or flowering plant, comes from the Greek angeíon (ἀγγεῖον; 'bottle, vessel') and spérma (σπέρμα; 'seed'); in 1690, the term Angiospermae was coined by Paul Hermann, albeit in reference to only a small subset of the species that are known as angiosperms, today. Hermann's Angiospermae included only flowering plants possessing seeds enclosed in capsules, distinguished from his Gymnospermae, which were flowering plants with achenial or schizo-carpic fruits (the whole fruit, or each of its pieces, being here regarded as a seed and naked). The terms Angiospermae and Gymnospermae were used by Carl Linnaeus in the same sense, albeit with restricted application, in the names of the orders of his class Didynamia.

The terms angiosperms and gymnosperm fundamentally changed meaning in 1827, when Robert Brown determined the existence of truly-naked ovules in the Cycadeae and Coniferae. The term gymnosperm was, from then-on, applied to seed plants with naked ovules, and the term angiosperm to seed plants with enclosed ovules. However, for many years after Brown's discovery, the primary division of the seed plants was seen as between monocots and dicots, with gymnosperms as a small subset of the dicots.

In 1851, Hofmeister discovered the changes occurring in the embryo-sac of flowering plants, and determined the correct relationships of these to the Cryptogamia. This fixed the position of Gymnosperms as a class distinct from Dicotyledons, and the term Angiosperm then, gradually, came to be accepted as the suitable designation for the whole of the flowering plants (other than Gymnosperms), including the classes of Dicotyledons and Monocotyledons. This is the sense in which the term is used, today.

In most taxonomies, the flowering plants are treated as a coherent group; the most popular descriptive name has been Angiospermae, with Anthophyta (lit. 'flower-plants') a second choice (both unranked). The Wettstein system and Engler system treated them as a subdivision (Angiospermae). The Reveal system also treated them as a subdivision (Magnoliophytina), but later split it to Magnoliopsida, Liliopsida, and Rosopsida. The Takhtajan system and Cronquist system treat them as a division (Magnoliophyta). The Dahlgren system and Thorne system (1992) treat them as a class (Magnoliopsida). The APG system of 1998, and the later 2003 and 2009 revisions, treat the flowering plants as an unranked clade without a formal Latin name (angiosperms). A formal classification was published alongside the 2009 revision in which the flowering plants rank as a subclass (Magnoliidae).

The internal classification of this group has undergone considerable revision. The Cronquist system, proposed by Arthur Cronquist in 1968 and published in its full form in 1981, is still widely used but is no longer believed to accurately reflect phylogeny. A consensus about how the flowering plants should be arranged has recently begun to emerge through the work of the Angiosperm Phylogeny Group (APG), which published an influential reclassification of the angiosperms in 1998. Updates incorporating more recent research were published as the APG II system in 2003, the APG III system in 2009, and the APG IV system in 2016.

Traditionally, the flowering plants are divided into two groups,

- Dicotyledoneae or Magnoliopsida
- Monocotyledoneae or Liliopsida

to which the Cronquist system ascribes the classes Magnoliopsida (from "Magnoliaceae") and Liliopsida (from "Liliaceae"). Other descriptive names allowed by Article 16 of the ICBN include Dicotyledones or Dicotyledoneae, and Monocotyledones or Monocotyledoneae, which have a long history of use. In plain English, their members may be called "dicotyledons" ("dicots") and "monocotyledons" ("monocots"). The Latin behind these names refers the observation that the dicots most often have two cotyledons, or embryonic leaves, within each seed. The monocots usually have only one, but the rule is not absolute either way. From a broad diagnostic point of view, the number of cotyledons is neither a particularly handy, nor a reliable character.

Recent studies, as per the APG, show that the monocots form a monophyletic group (a clade), but that the dicots are paraphyletic; nevertheless, the majority of dicot species fall into a clade with the eudicots (or tricolpates), with most of the remaining going into another major clade with the magnoliids (containing about 9,000 species). The remainder includes a paraphyletic grouping of early-branching taxa known collectively as the basal angiosperms, plus the families Ceratophyllaceae and Chloranthaceae.

== Plantae, the Plant Kingdom ==
The plant kingdom is traditionally divided according to the following:

Latin	Common	No. of species	Notes
Bryophyta	Mosses	approx. 25,000	No vascular system, distinctive vegetative structures, spores produced for reproduction require damp conditions for survival, many of them are important to the early stages of soil formation.
Pteridophyta	Ferns	approx. 13,000	Identifiable root, leaf and stem systems but still produce spores instead of seed.
Gymnosperms	Non-flowering seed plant	approx. 1,000	They are a group of seed producing plants, which include Coniferophyta, Ginkgophyta, Cycadophyta and Gnetophyta.
Angiosperms	Flowering plants	approx. 300,000	They are divided into two main classes the monocotyledons and dicotyledons, produce seeds that are protected by fruits.

== Identification, classification and description of plants ==
Three goals of plant taxonomy are the identification, classification and description of plants. The distinction between these three goals is important and often overlooked.

Plant identification is a determination of the identity of an unknown plant by comparison with previously collected specimens or with the aid of books or identification manuals. The process of identification connects the specimen with a published name. Once a plant specimen has been identified, its name and properties are known.

Plant classification is the placing of known plants into groups or categories to show some relationship. Scientific classification follows a system of rules that standardizes the results, and groups successive categories into a hierarchy. For example, the family to which the lilies belong is classified as follows:

- Kingdom: Plantae
- Division: Magnoliophyta
- Class: Liliopsida
- Order: Liliales
- Family: Liliaceae

The classification of plants results in an organized system for the naming and cataloging of future specimens, and ideally reflects scientific ideas about inter-relationships between plants. The set of rules and recommendations for formal botanical nomenclature, including plants, is governed by the International Code of Nomenclature for algae, fungi, and plants abbreviated as ICN.

Plant description is a formal description of a newly discovered species, and takes place only after significant scientific work to determine that a species is in fact new to science. New descriptions are usually published in the form of a scientific paper using ICN guidelines. The names of these plants can then be registered to the International Plant Names Index along with other validly published names.

== Classification systems ==
These include;

- APG system (angiosperm phylogeny group)
  - APG II system (angiosperm phylogeny group II)
  - APG III system (angiosperm phylogeny group III)
  - APG IV system (angiosperm phylogeny group IV)
- Bessey system (a system of plant taxonomy)
- Cronquist system (taxonomic classification of flowering plants)
- Melchior system

== Online databases ==
- Plants of the World Online (POWO)
- World Flora Online (WFO)
- Ecocrop
- EPPO Code
- GRIN

See Category: Online botany databases

== See also ==
- American Society of Plant Taxonomists
- Biophysical environment
- Botanical nomenclature
- Citrus taxonomy
- Environmental protection
- Herbarium
- History of plant systematics
- International Association for Plant Taxonomy
- Taxonomy of cultivated plants

== Sources ==
- APG (2003). "An update of the Angiosperm Phylogeny Group classification for the orders and families of flowering plants: APG II". Botanical Journal of the Linnean Society. 141 (4): 399–436. doi:10.1046/j.1095-8339.2003.t01-1-00158.x.
- APG (2009). "An update of the Angiosperm Phylogeny Group classification for the orders and families of flowering plants: APG III". Botanical Journal of the Linnean Society. 161 (2): 105–121. doi:10.1111/j.1095-8339.2009.00996.x. hdl:10654/18083.
- Chase, Mark W.; Reveal, James L. (2009). "A phylogenetic classification of the land plants to accompany APG III". Botanical Journal of the Linnean Society. 161 (2): 122–127. doi:10.1111/j.1095-8339.2009.01002.x.
