= Liliidae =

Subclass of flowering plants

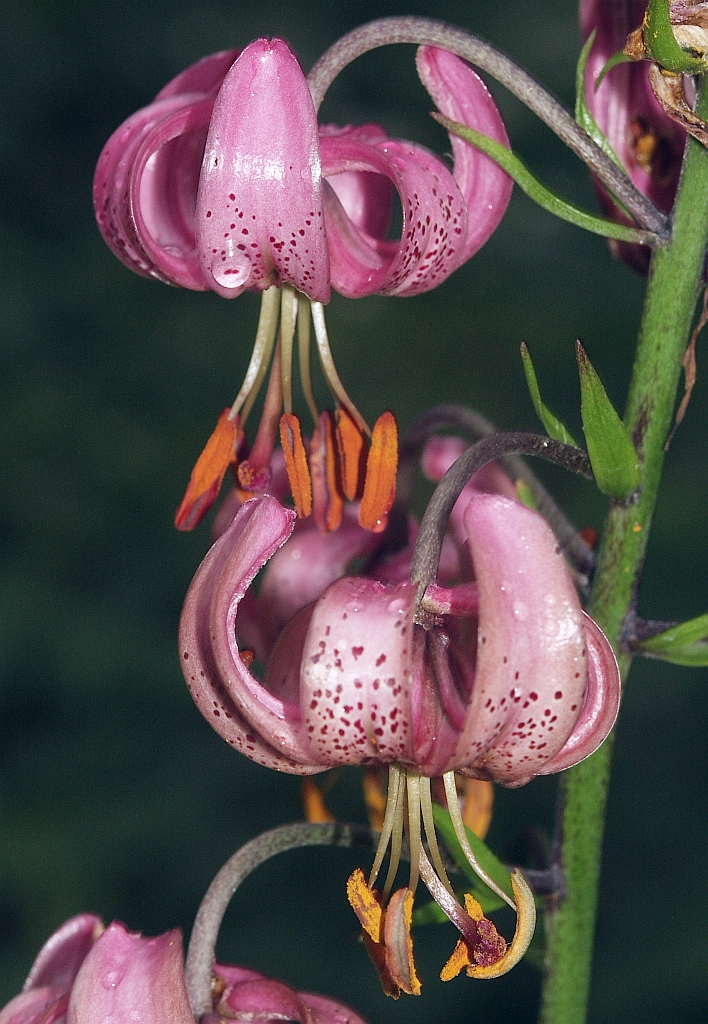
Lilium martagon

Liliidae is a botanical name at the rank of subclass. Circumscription of the subclass will vary with the taxonomic system being used (there are many such systems); the only requirement being that it includes the family Liliaceae.

== Liliidae in Takhtajan system ==
The Takhtajan system treats this as one of six subclasses within class Liliopsida (= monocotyledons). This subclass consists of:

- subclass Liliidae
  superorder Lilianae
  order Melanthiales
  order Colchicales
  order Trilliales
  order Liliales
  order Alstroemeriales
  order Iridales
  order Tecophilaeales
  order Burmanniales
  order Hypoxidales
  order Orchidales
  order Amaryllidales
  order Asparagales
  order Xanthorrhoeales
  order Hanguanales
  superorder Dioscoreanae
  order Stemonales
  order Smilacales
  order Dioscoreales
  order Taccales

== Liliidae in Cronquist system ==
The Cronquist system treats this as one of five subclasses within class Liliopsida (= monocotyledons), and it consists of:

- subclass Liliidae
  order Liliales
  order Orchidales

== Liliidae in Dahlgren and Thorne systems ==
In the Dahlgren system and the Thorne system (1992) this is an important name: this subclass comprises the monocotyledons (in APG II these are the monocots).

=== Dahlgren (1985) ===
- subclass Liliidae [= monocotyledons]
  superorder Alismatanae
  superorder Triuridanae
  superorder Aranae
  superorder Lilianae
  superorder Bromelianae
  superorder Zingiberanae
  superorder Commelinanae
  superorder Arecanae
  superorder Cyclanthanae
  superorder Pandananae

=== Thorne (1992) ===
(in the version of the system as depicted by Reveal)

- subclass Liliidae [= monocotyledons ]
  superorder Lilianae
  superorder Hydatellanae
  superorder Triuridanae
  superorder Aranae
  superorder Cyclanthanae
  superorder Pandananae
  superorder Arecanae
  superorder Commelinanae

== Liliidae in APG II system ==
The APG and APG II systems do not use formal botanical names above the rank of order, and names such as Liliopsida and Liliidae have no place in these systems.
