= Takhtajan system =

System of plant classification developed by the Russian scientist Armen Takhtajan

A system of plant taxonomy, the Takhtajan system of plant classification was published by Armen Takhtajan, in several versions from the 1950s onwards. It is usually compared to the Cronquist system. It admits paraphyletic groups.

== Systems ==
The first classification was published in Russian in 1954, and came to the attention of the rest of the world after publication of an English translation in 1958 as Origin of Angiospermous Plants. Further versions appeared in 1959 (Die Evolution der Angiospermen) and 1966 (Sistema i filogeniia tsvetkovykh rastenii). The latter popularised Takhtajan's system when it appeared in English in 1969 (Flowering plants: Origin and dispersal). A further revision appeared in 1980.

=== 1966 system ===
- Magnoliophyta (Angiospermae) p. 51
  - Class: Magnoliatae (Dicotyledones) p. 51
  - Class: Liliatae (Monocotyledones) p. 461
    - Subclass A: Alismidae p. 461
    - Subclass B: Liliidae p. 473 (was nom. nov.)
      - Superorder Lilianae p. 473 (was nom. nov.)
        - Order Liliales p. 473
          - Family Liliaceae p. 474
          - Family Xanthorrhoeaceae p. 476
          - Family Aphyllanthaceae p. 476
          - Family Alliaceae p. 477
          - Family Agavaceae p. 478
          - Family Amaryllidaceae p. 480
          - Family Alstroemeriaceae p. 481
          - Family Haemodoraceae p. 482
          - Family Hypoxidaceae p. 483
          - Family Velloziaceae p. 483
          - Family Philesiaceae p. 484
          - Family Tecophilaeaceae p. 484
          - Family Cyanastraceae p. 485
          - Family Asparagaceae p. 486
          - Family Smilacaceae p. 487
          - Family Stemonaceae p. 487
          - Family Dioscoreaceae p. 488
          - Family Taccaceae p. 489
          - Family Phylydraceae p. 491
          - Family Pontederiaceae p. 490
        - Order Bromeliales p. 492
        - Order Iridales p. 494
        - Order Zingiberales p. 498
        - Order Orchidales p. 505
      - Superorder Juncanae p. 510
    - Subclass C: Commelinidae p. 461
    - Subclass D: Arecidae p. 525

=== 1997 system ===
As published in Diversity and Classification of Flowering Plants

- Division Magnoliophyta (2 classes, 17 subclasses, 71 superorders, 232 orders, 589 families
  - Class Magnoliopsida Brongn. (1843) (Dicotyledons) 11 subclasses, 55 superorders, 175 orders, 458 families
    - Subclass Magnoliidae Novak ex Takht. (1967)
    - Subclass Nymphaeidae J.W. Walker ex Takht. (1997)
    - Subclass Nelumbonidae Takht. (1997)
    - Subclass Ranunculidae Takht. ex Reveal (1992)
    - Subclass Caryophyllidae Takht. (1967)
    - Subclass Hamamelididae Takht. (1967)
    - Subclass Dilleniidae Takht. ex Reveal & Tahkt. (1993)
    - Subclass Rosidae Takht. (1967)
    - Subclass Cornidae Frohne & U. Jensen ex Reveal (1994)
    - Subclass Asteridae Takht. (1967)
    - Subclass Lamiidae Takht. ex Reveal (1993)
  - Class Liliopsida Batsch (1802) (Monocotyledons) 6 subclasses, 16 superorders, 57 orders, 131 families
    - Subclass Liliidae Takht. (1967)
      - Superorder Lilianae Takht. (1967) 14 orders
        - Order Melanthiales R. Dahlgren ex Reveal (1992)
        - Order Colchicales Dumort. (1829)
        - Order Trilliales Takht. (1996)
        - Order Liliales Perleb (1826)
          - Family Liliaceae Juss., nom. cons. (1789)
          - Family Medeolaceae (S. Wats.) Takht. (1987)
        - Order Alstroemeriales Hutch. (1934)
        - Order Iridales Raf. (1815)
        - Order Tecophilaeales Traub ex Reveal (1993)
        - Order Burmanniales Heintze (1927)
        - Order Hypoxidales Takht., nom. inval. (1997)
        - Order Orchidales Raf. (1815)
        - Order Amaryllidales Bromhead (1840)
        - Order Asparagales Bromhead (1838)
        - Order Xanthorrhoeales Takth., nom. inval. (1997)
        - Order Hanguanales R. Dahlgren ex Reveal (1992)
      - Superorder Dioscoreanae Takht. ex Reveal & Doweld (1999)
    - Subclass Commelinidae Takht. (1967)
    - Subclass Arecidae Takht. (1967)
    - Subclass Alismatidae Takht. (1967)
    - Subclass Triurididae Takht. ex Reveal (1992)
    - Subclass Aridae Takht. (1997)

=== 2009 system ===
As published in Flowering Plants

- Phylum Magnoliophyta (flowering plants) Cronquist, Takht. & Zimmerm. ex Reveal (1996)
  - Class Magnoliopsida Brongn. (1843) (Dicotyledons) p. 7
    - Subclass I. Magnoliidae p. 11
      - Superorder Nymphaeanae
      - Superorder Magnolianae
      - Superorder Lauranae
      - Superorder Piperanae
      - Superorder Rafflesianae
    - Subclass II. Ranunculidae p. 69
      - Superorder Proteanae
      - Superorder Ranunculanae
    - Subclass III. Hamamelididae p. 101
      - Superorder Hamamelidanae
      - Superorder Juglandanae
    - Subclass IV. Caryophyllidae p. 129
      - Superorder Caryophyllanae
      - Superorder Polygonanae
      - Superorder Nepenthanae
    - Subclass V. Dilleniidae p. 167
      - Superorder Dillenianae
      - Superorder Ericanae
      - Superorder Violanae
      - Superorder Capparanae
      - Superorder Malvanae
      - Superorder Euphorbianae
    - Subclass VI. Rosidae p. 293
      - Superorder Rosanae
      - Superorder Myrtanae
      - Superorder Fabanae
      - Superorder Rutanae
      - Superorder Celastranae
      - Superorder Santalanae
      - Superorder Balanophoranae
      - Superorder Rhamnanae
    - Subclass VII. Asteridae p. 435
      - Superorder Cornanae
      - Superorder Asperanae
    - Subclass VIII. Lamiidae p. 511
      - Superorder Lamianae
  - Class Liliopsida Scop. (1760) (Monocotyledons) p. 595
    - Subclass I: Alismatidae p. 589
      - Superorder Petrosavianae
      - Superorder Alismatanae
      - Superorder Aranae
    - Subclass II: Liliidae Takht. (1966) p. 625
      - Superorder Lilianae Takht. (1966)
        - Order Melanthiales R. Dahlgren ex Reveal (1992)
        - Order Trilliales Takht. (1996)
        - Order Liliales Perleb (1826)
          - 1. Family Campynemataceae
          - 2. Family Colchicaceae
          - 3. Family Tricyrtidaceae
          - 4. Family Scoliopaceae p. 634
          - 5. Family Calochortaceae p. 634
          - 6. Family Liliaceae Juss., nom. cons. (1789) p. 634
          - 7. Family Medeolaceae (S. Wats.) Takht. (1987) p. 634
        - Order Burmanniales
        - Order Alstroemeriales Hutch. (1934)
        - Order Smilacales
        - Order Orchidales
        - Order Iridales
        - Order Amaryllidales
        - Order Asparagales
      - Superorder Pandananae
      - Superorder Dioscoreanae Takht., nom. inval. (1997)
      - Superorder Arecanae
    - Subclass III: Arecidae p. 693
      - Superorder Arecanae
    - Subclass IV: Commelinidae p. 699
      - Superorder Bromelianae
      - Superorder Zingiberanae
      - Superorder Commelinanae
      - Superorder Juncanae
      - Superorder Poanae

== Bibliography ==
- Cronquist, Arthur; Takhtajan, Armen; Zimmermann, Walter (April 1966). "On the Higher Taxa of Embryobionta". Taxon. 15 (4): 129–134. doi:10.2307/1217531. JSTOR 1217531.
- Singh, Gurcharan (2004). "Armen Takhtajan". Plant Systematics: An Integrated Approach. Science Publishers. pp. 269–277. ISBN 1-57808-351-6.
- Reveal, James (22 November 1998). "Lists of the Flowering Plant Taxa Accepted by Cronquist, Dahlgren, Reveal, Takhtajan & Thorne". Vascular Plant Family Nomenclature. University of Maryland: Norton-Brown Herbarium.
- Reveal, James L (5 Nov 1997). "Takhtajan System of Classification" (pbio 250 Lecture Notes). Plant Systematics. University of Maryland: Norton-Brown Herbarium.
- Brands, SJ. "A. Takhtajan, 1997". The Taxonomicon. Zwaag, The Netherlands: Universal Taxonomic Services.

Works by Takhtajan

- Takhtajan, Armen Leonovich (1966). Система и филогения цветкорых растений (Sistema i filogeniia tsvetkovykh rastenii) [Systema et Phylogemia Magnoliophytorum] (in Russian). Moscow: Наука. ISBN 0-05-001715-2. Translated by C Jeffrey, as Flowering plants: Origin and dispersal, Edinburgh : Oliver and Boyd, 1969.
- Takhtajan, A. (1980). "Outline of the classification of flowering plants (Magnoliophya)". Botanical Review. 46 (3): 225–359. Bibcode:1980BotRv..46..225T. doi:10.1007/BF02861558. S2CID 30764910.
- Takhtajan, A. (1987). Sistema Magnoliofitov (Systema Magnoliophytorum) (in Russian). Leningrad: Nauka.
  - Schmid, Rudolf (May 1988). "Takhtajan's Latest System of Classification for the Angiosperms". Taxon (Review). 37 (2): 422–424. doi:10.2307/1222164. JSTOR 1222164.
- Takhtajan, Armen (1991). Evolutionary trends in flowering plants. New York: Columbia Univ. Press. ISBN 9780231073288.
- Takhtajan, Armen (2009). Flowering Plants (Electronic ed.). Springer. doi:10.1007/978-1-4020-9609-9. ISBN 978-1-4020-9609-9. Full access available to users of The Wikipedia Library.
- Takhtajan, Armen Leonovich (1997). Diversity and Classification of Flowering Plants. Columbia University Press. ISBN 978-0-231-10098-4.
