= Arecidae =

Subclass of flowering plants

Arecidae is a botanical name at the rank of subclass. Circumscription of the subclass will vary with the taxonomic system being used (there are many such systems); the only requirement being that it includes the family Arecaceae.

== Arecidae in the Takhtajan system ==
The Takhtajan system used this name for a subclass in the class Liliopsida (=monocotyledons).

- subclass Arecidae
  superorder Arecanae
  order Arecales
  family Arecaceae (or Palmae)
  order Cyclanthales
  family Cyclanthaceae
  order Arales
  family Araceae
  family Lemnaceae
  order Pandanales
  family Pandanaceae
  order Typhales
  family Sparganiaceae
  family Typhaceae

== Arecidae in the Cronquist system ==
The Cronquist system (1981) used this name for a subclass in the class Liliopsida (=monocotyledons), with the circumscription:

- subclass Arecidae
  order Arecales
  family Arecaceae (or Palmae)
  order Cyclanthales
  family Cyclanthaceae
  order Pandanales
  family Pandanaceae
  order Arales
  family Acoraceae
  family Araceae
  family Lemnaceae

== APG II system ==
The APG II system does not use formal botanical names above the rank of order; it assigns the plants included in this subclass by Cronquist in various taxa throughout the clade monocots. In other words, by today's standards Cronquist's subclass was not a "good" group.
