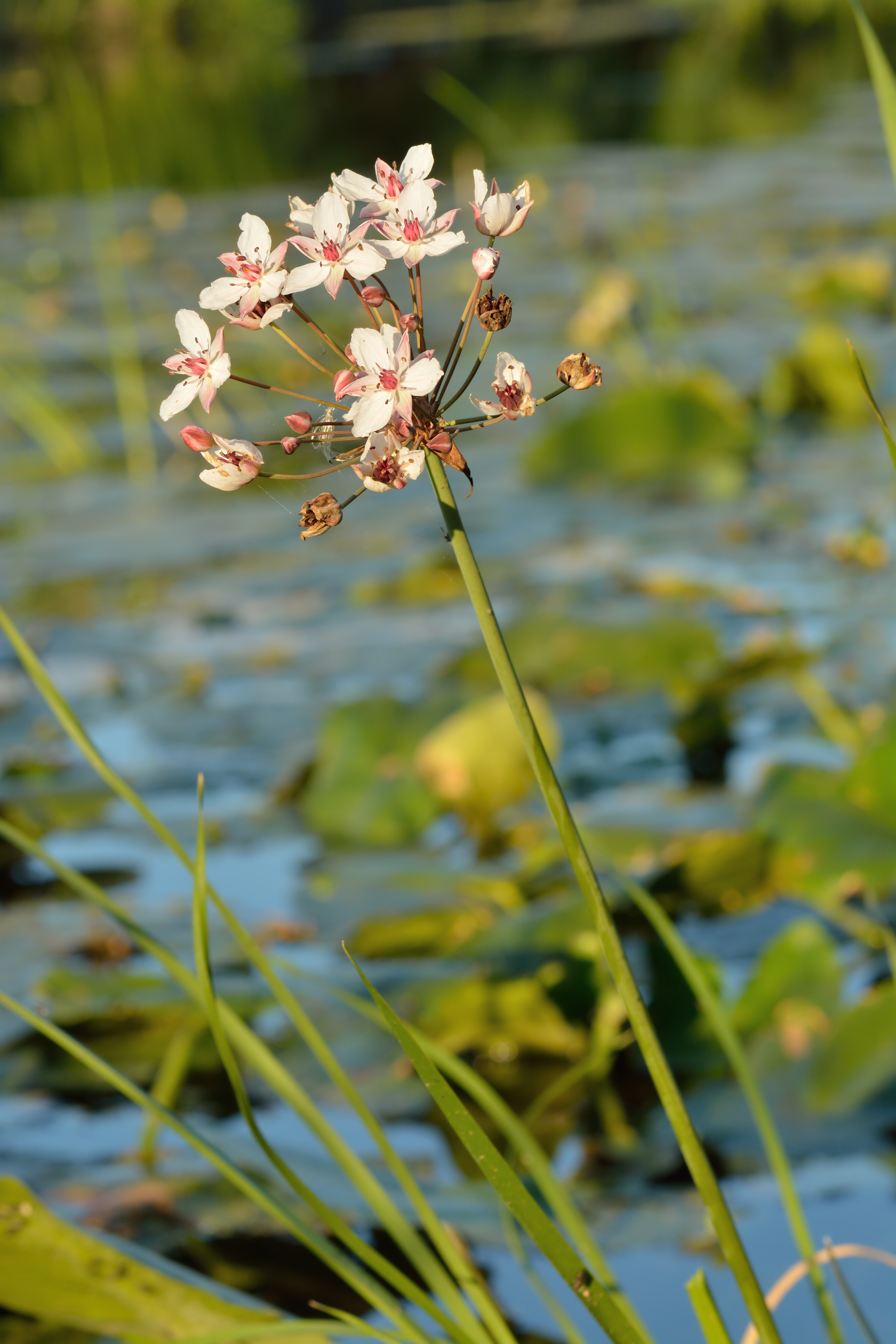
- Butomus umbellatus

Scientific classification
- Kingdom: Plantae
- Clade: Embryophytes
- Clade: Tracheophytes
- Clade: Spermatophytes
- Clade: Angiosperms
- Clade: Monocots
- Order: Alismatales
- Family: Butomaceae; Mirb.
- Genus: Butomus; L.

Type species
- Butomus umbellatus L.

Species
- See text
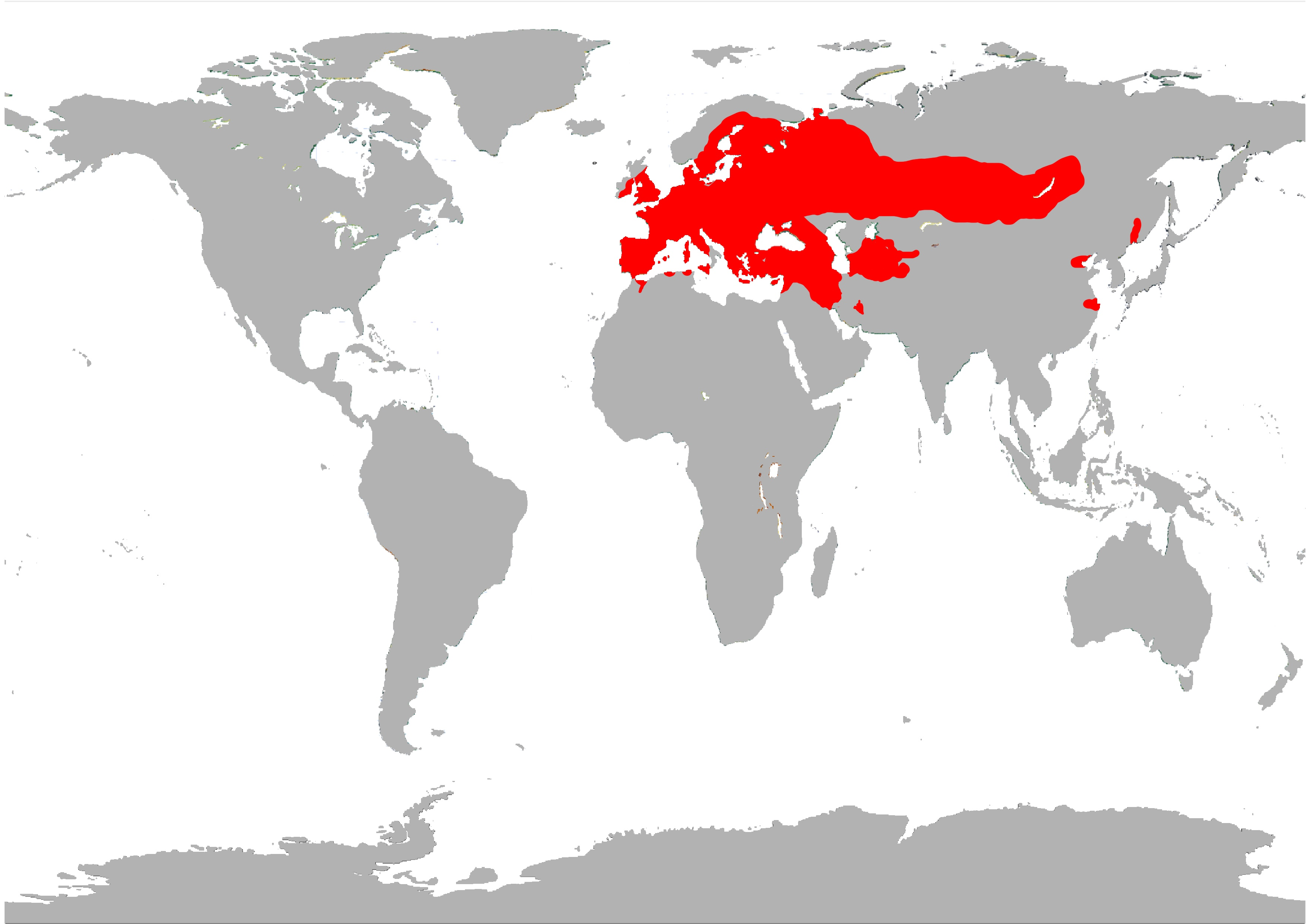

= Butomus =

Flowering rush

Genus of flowering plants

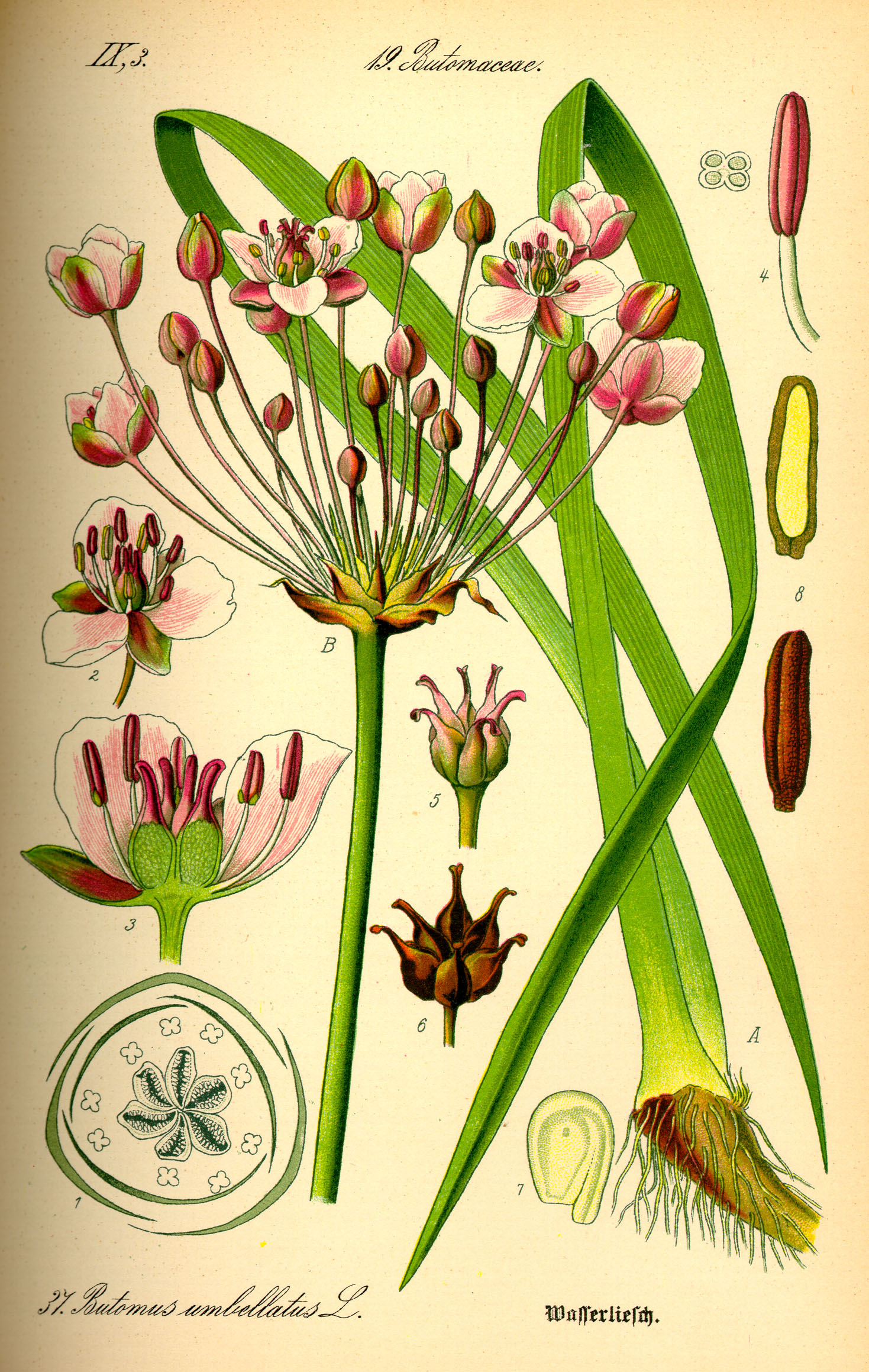
Butomus umbellatus

Butomus is the only known genus in the plant family Butomaceae, native to Europe and Asia. It is considered invasive in some parts of the United States.

== Taxonomy ==
The Butomaceae family has been recognized by most taxonomists as a plant family; it is sometimes called the "flowering-rush family".

The APG II system, of 2003 (unchanged from the APG system, 1998), also recognizes such a family, and places it in the order Alismatales, in the clade monocots. At the ranks of family and order, this is the same placement as in the Cronquist system. However, Cronquist assumed a much smaller order and assigned the order to subclass Alismatidae, in class Liliopsida [=monocotyledons].

== Species ==
The family counts one species, Butomus umbellatus, or two according to some authorities.

- Butomus junceus Turcz. (synonym Butomus umbellatus var. junceus (Turcz.) Micheli) – Siberia, Mongolia, and Tajikistan
- Butomus umbellatus L. - China, Central Asia, Indian subcontinent, Middle East, Russia, Europe; naturalized in North America
