= Sparganiaceae =

Family of plants

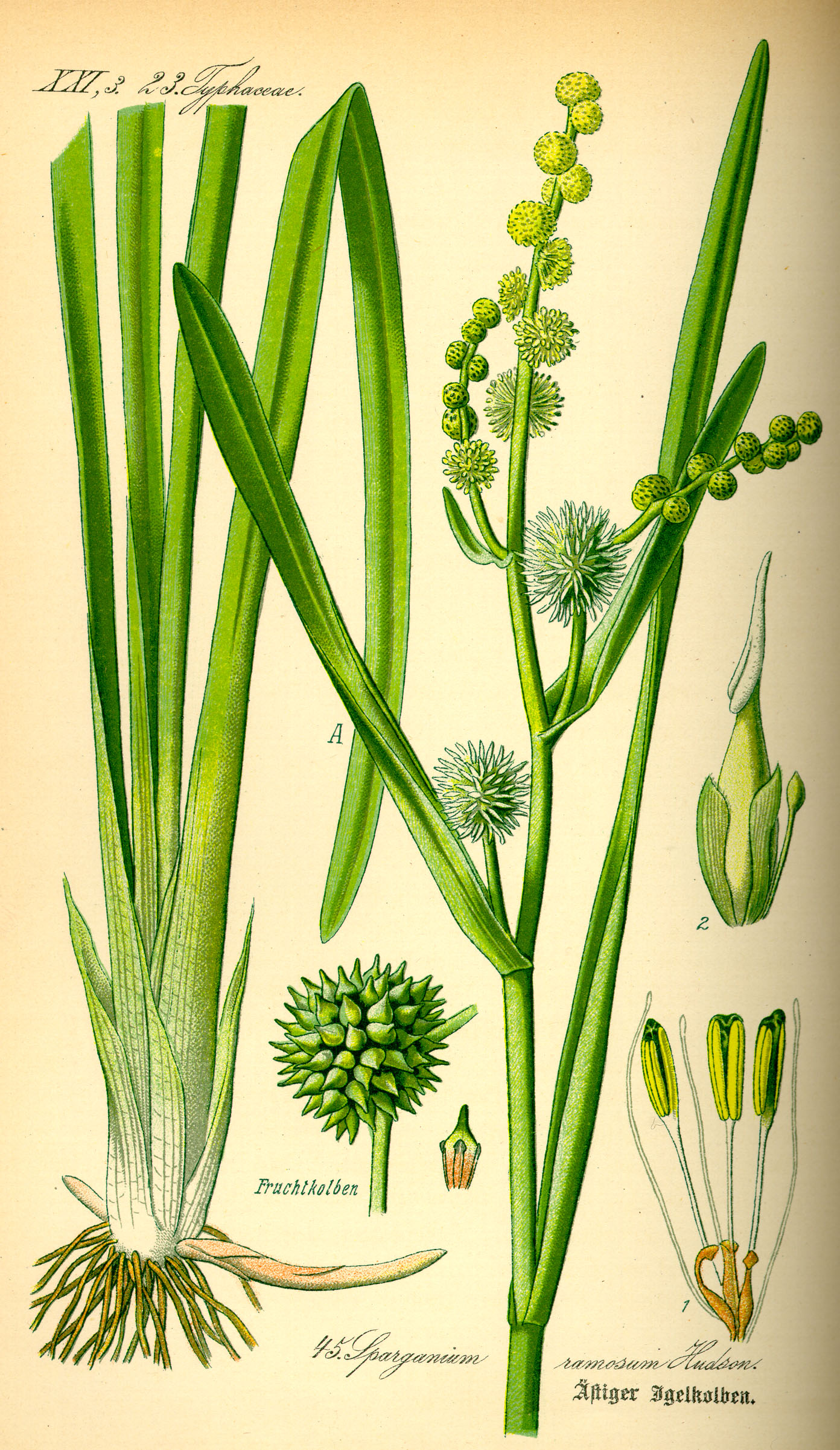
Sparganium erectum

Sparganiaceae is a family of flowering plants. Such a family was previously recognized by most taxonomists.

The APG II system, of 2003 (unchanged from the APG system, 1998), also recognizes this family, and assigns it to the order Poales in the clade commelinids, in the monocots. The family consists of only one genus Sparganium of fewer than two dozen species, perennial plants of wet habitats. By the APG III system of 2009, Sparganium had been found to be fairly closely related to Typha, and so was placed with that genus in family Typhaceae.

The Cronquist system, of 1981, also recognized such a family and placed it in the order Typhales in the subclass Commelinidae in class Liliopsida in division Magnoliophyta.

The Wettstein system, last updated in 1935, placed the family in order Pandanales.
