= Hydrocharitales =

Order of flowering plants

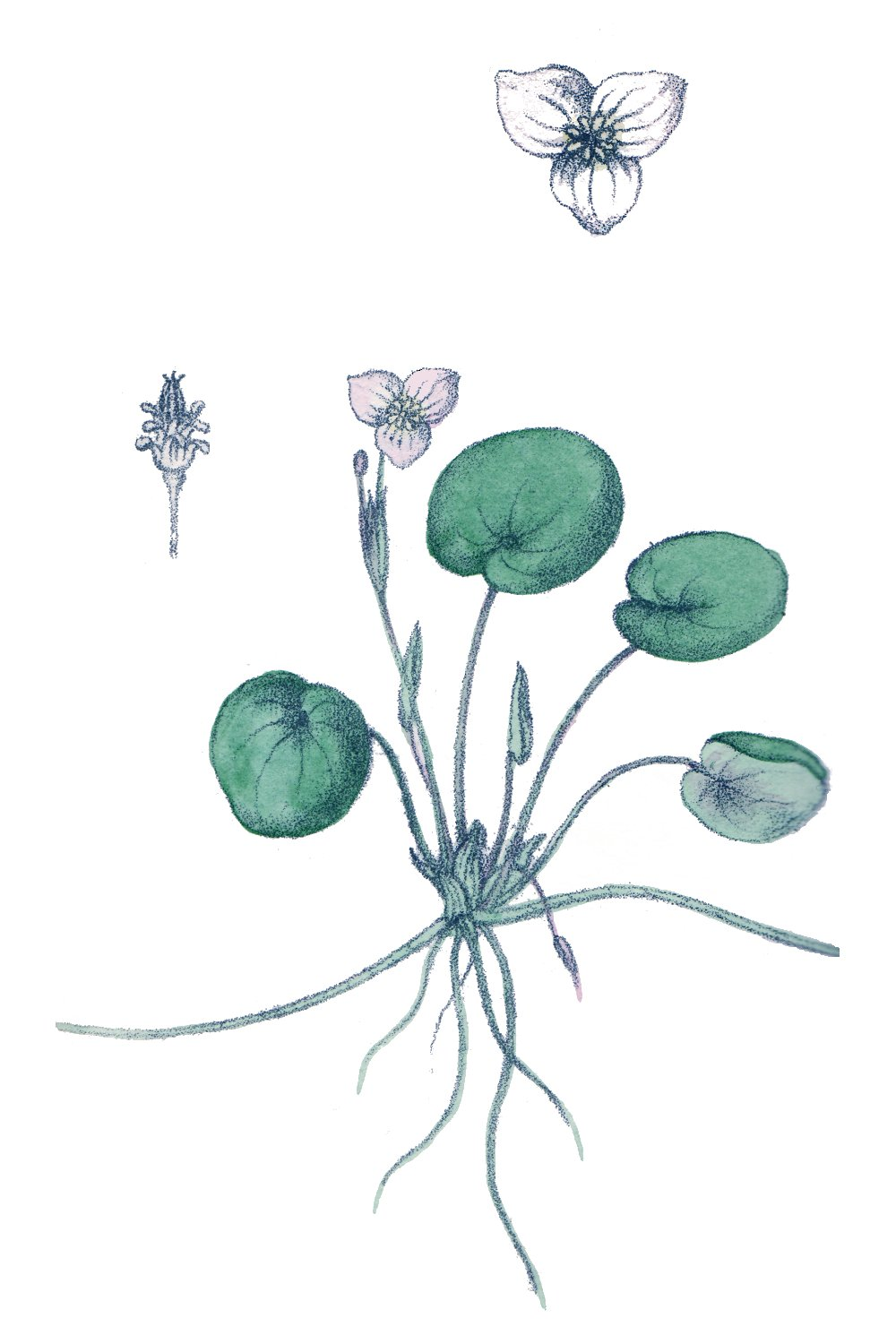
Hydrocharis morsus-ranae, a member of the family Hydrocharitaceae

Hydrocharitales is a botanical name of an order of flowering plants. The Cronquist system (1981) used this name for an order in subclass Alismatidae, with this circumscription:

- order Hydrocharitales
  family Hydrocharitaceae

The APG II system, used here, assigns most of the plants involved to the expanded order Alismatales, in the clade monocots.
