= Zingiberidae =

Subclass of flowering plants

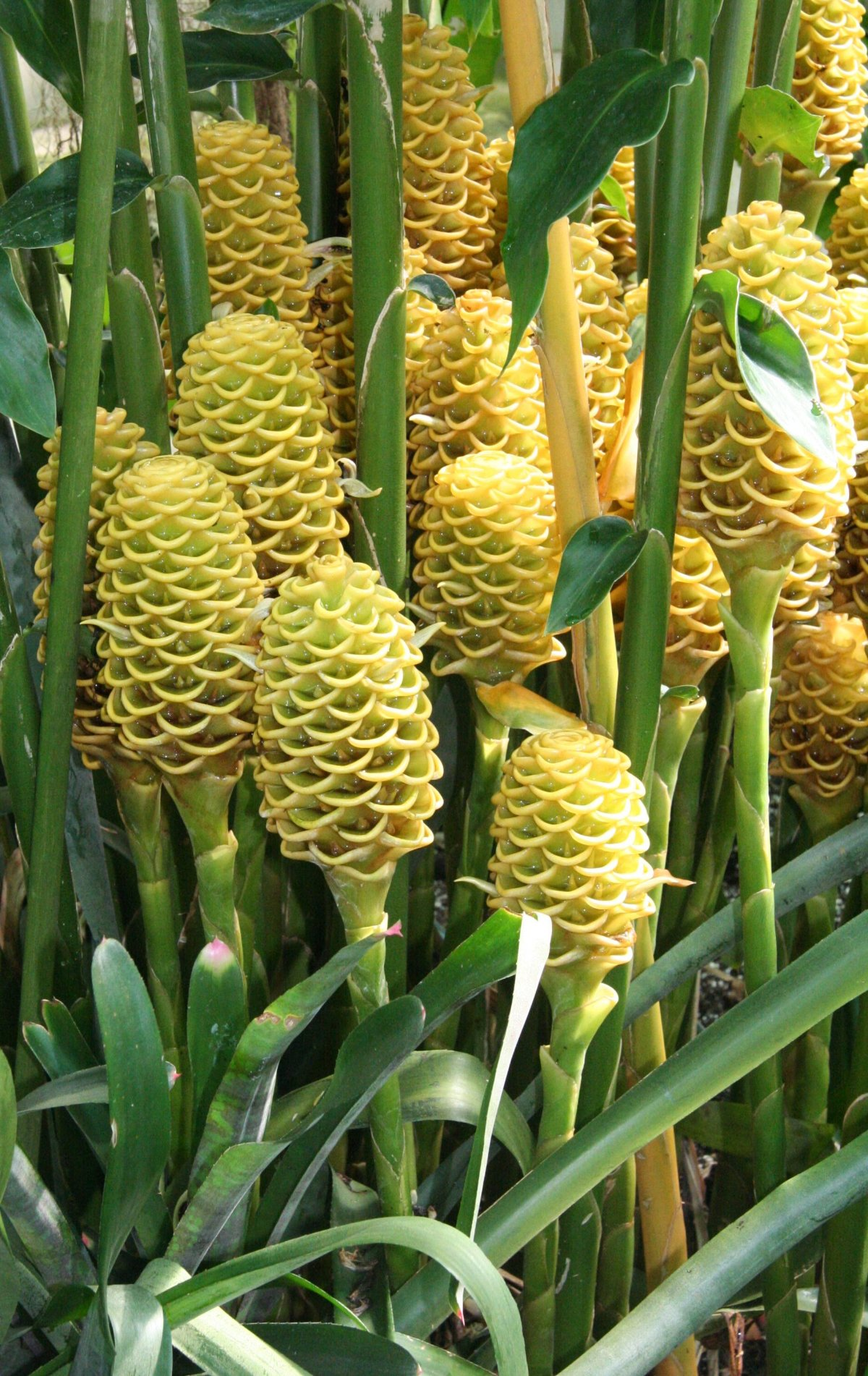
Zingiber spectabile

Zingiberidae is a botanical name at the rank of subclass. Circumscription of the subclass will vary with the taxonomic system being used (there are many such systems); the only requirement being that it includes the family Zingiberaceae.

== Cronquist system ==
The Cronquist system (1981) treats this as one of four subclasses in class Liliopsida (=monocotyledons). It consists of:

- subclass Zingiberidae
  order Zingiberales
  order Bromeliales

== APG II system ==
The APG II system does not use formal botanical names above the rank of order. The plants involved here are assigned to order Zingiberales and Poales, both monocots.
