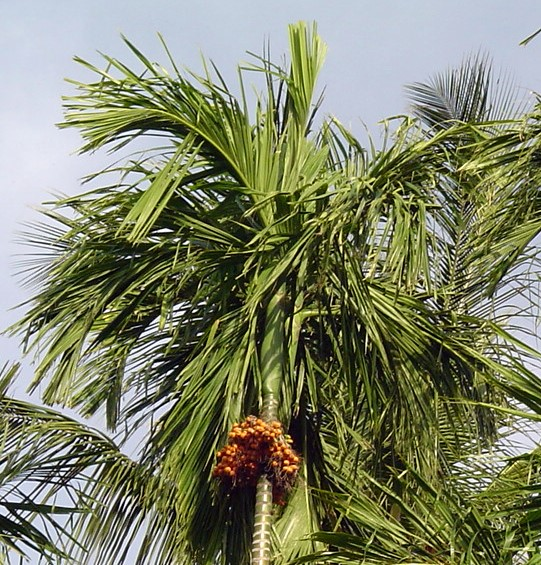
- Areca catechu

Scientific classification
- Kingdom: Plantae
- Clade: Tracheophytes
- Clade: Angiosperms
- Clade: Monocots
- Clade: Commelinids
- Order: Arecales; Bromhead

Families
- Arecaceae; Dasypogonaceae

Diversity
- 206 genera

= Arecales =

Arecales Temporal range: 80–0 Ma Late Cretaceous - Recent

Order of flowering plants

Arecales is an order of flowering plants. The order has been widely named as such only for the past few decades; until then, the accepted name for the order including these plants was Principes. The order includes palms and relatives.

== Taxonomy ==
The APG IV system of 2016 places Dasypogonaceae in this order, after studies showing Dasypogonaceae as sister to Arecaceae. However, this decision has been called into question.

=== Historical taxonomical systems ===
The Cronquist system of 1981 assigned the order to the subclass Arecidae in the class Liliopsida (= monocotyledons).

The Thorne system (1992) and the Dahlgren system assigned the order to the superorder Areciflorae, also called Arecanae in the subclass Liliidae (= monocotyledons), with the single family Arecaceae.

The APG II system of 2003 recognised the order and placed it in the clade commelinids in the monocots and uses this circumscription:

- order Arecales
  family Arecaceae, alternative name Palmae

This was unchanged from the APG system of 1998, although it used the spelling "commelinoids" instead of commelinids.

==== Principes ====
In plant taxonomy, Principes is a botanical name, meaning "the first". It was used in the Engler system for an order in the Monocotyledones and later in the Kubitzki system. This order included one family only, the Palmae (alternate name Arecaceae). As the rules for botanical nomenclature provide for the use of such descriptive botanical names above the rank of family it is quite allowed to use this name even today, but in practice most systems prefer the name Arecales.

Following this, Principes became the name of the journal of the International Palm Society, becoming Palms in 1999.
