= Callitrichales =

Order of flowering plants

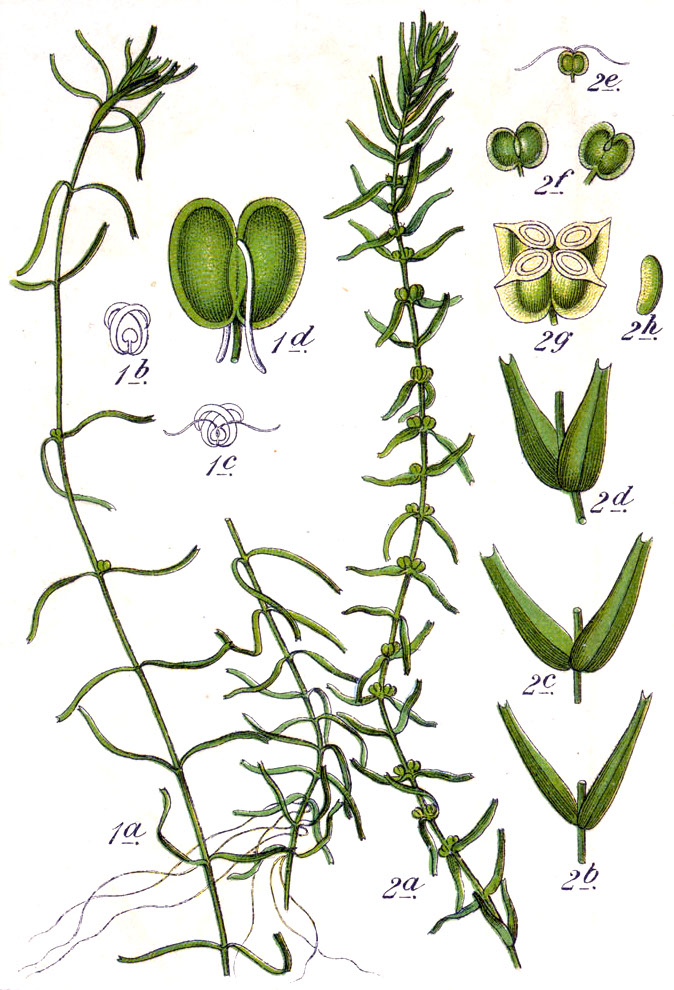
Callitriche hermaphroditica, a member of the Callitrichaceae

Callitrichales is a proposed order of flowering plants. As circumscribed by American botanist Arthur Cronquist in the Cronquist system (1981), the order included three families:

- Hippuridaceae
- Callitrichaceae
- Hydrostachyaceae

A feature is the single stamen in the flower.

The order is not recognized by the Angiosperm Phylogeny Group; the family Hydrostachyaceae is placed in the order Cornales and the plants making up the other two families are included in the family Plantaginaceae.
