= Najadales =

Order of flowering plants

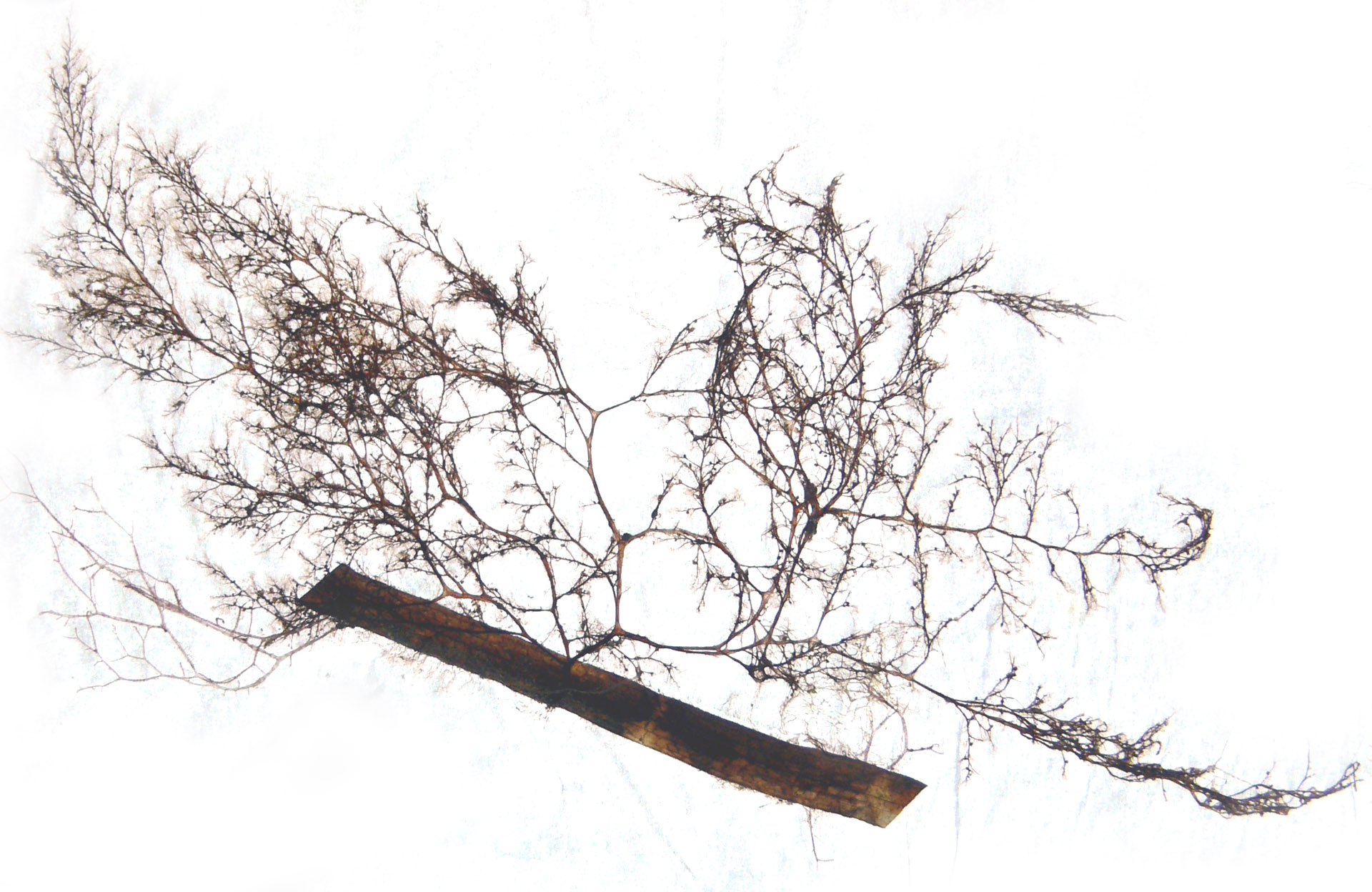
Member of the Zosteraceae

Najadales is the botanical name of an order of flowering plants. A well-known system that used this name is the Cronquist system (1981), which used this name for an order in subclass Alismatidae with this circumscription:

- order Najadales
  - family Aponogetonaceae
  - family Scheuchzeriaceae
  - family Juncaginaceae
  - family Potamogetonaceae
  - family Ruppiaceae
  - family Najadaceae
  - family Zannichelliaceae
  - family Posidoniaceae
  - family Cymodoceaceae
  - family Zosteraceae

The APG II system, used here, assigns the plants involved to the expanded order Alismatales, in the clade 'monocots'.
