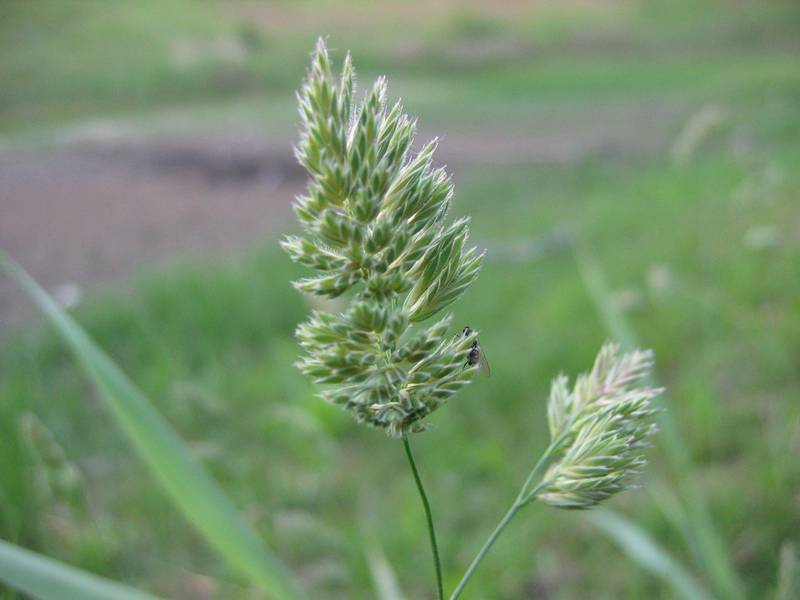
- Cock's-foot grass (Dactylis glomerata)

Scientific classification
- Kingdom: Plantae
- Clade: Tracheophytes
- Clade: Angiosperms
- Clade: Monocots
- Clade: Commelinids

Orders
- Arecales; Commelinales; Poales; Zingiberales

Diversity
- About 1,420 genera

= Commelinids =

Commelinids Temporal range: Late Cretaceous–recent

Clade of monocot flowering plants

In plant taxonomy, commelinids (originally commelinoids) is a clade of flowering plants within the monocots, distinguished by having cell walls containing UV-fluorescent ferulic acid. Well-known commelinids include palms and relatives (order Arecales), dayflowers, spiderworts, kangaroo paws, and water hyacinth (order Commelinales), grasses, bromeliads, pineapples, rushes, and sedges (order Poales), ginger, cardamom, turmeric, galangal, bananas, plantains, and bird of paradise flower (order Zingiberales).

The commelinids are the only clade that the APG IV system has informally named within the monocots. The remaining monocots are a paraphyletic unit. Also known as the commelinid monocots it forms one of three groupings within the monocots, and the final branch; the other two groups are the alismatid monocots and the lilioid monocots.

== Taxonomy and phylogeny ==
The commelinids constitute a well-supported clade within the monocots, and this clade has been recognized in all four APG classification systems. It consists of four orders:

- Arecales (palms)
- Commelinales (spiderwort, water hyacinth)
- Poales (grasses, rushes, bromeliads)
- Zingiberales (gingers, banana)

Phylogenetic tree showing position of the commelinids within the monocots

- monocots 131
  - - - Acorales
      - - Alismatales
        - 122
          - Petrosaviales
          - - 120
              - Dioscoreales 115
              - Pandanales 91
            - - Liliales 121
              - 121
                - Asparagales 120
                - commelinids 118
                  - Arecales
                  - Poales
                  - - Commelinales
                    - Zingiberales

As of APG IV (2016) the family Dasypogonaceae is no longer directly placed under commelinids but instead a family of order Arecales.

== Historical taxonomy ==
The commelinids were first recognized as a formal group in 1967 by Armen Takhtajan, who named them the Commelinidae and assigned them to a subclass of Liliopsida (monocots). The name was also used in the 1981 Cronquist system. However, by the release of his 1980 system of classification, Takhtajan had merged this subclass into a larger one, and no longer considered it to be a clade.

=== Takhtajan system ===
The Takhtajan system treated this as one of six subclasses within the class Liliopsida (=monocotyledons). It consisted of the following:

subclass Commelinidae
superorder Bromelianae
order Bromeliales
order Velloziales
superorder Pontederianae
order Philydrales
order Pontederiales
order Haemodorales
superorder Zingiberanae
order Musales
order Lowiales
order Zingiberales
order Cannales
superorder Commelinanae
order Commelinales
order Mayacales
order Xyridales
order Rapateales
order Eriocaulales
superorder Hydatellanae
order Hydatellales
superorder Juncanae
order Juncales
order Cyperales
superorder Poanae
order Flagellariales
order Restionales
order Centrolepidales
order Poales

=== Cronquist system ===
The Cronquist system treated this as one of four subclasses within the class Liliopsida. It consisted of the following:

subclass Commelinidae
order Commelinales
order Eriocaulales
order Restionales
order Juncales
order Cyperales
order Hydatellales
order Typhales

=== APG system ===
The APG II system does not use formal botanical names above the rank of order; most of the members were assigned to the clade commelinids in the monocots (its predecessor, the APG system used the clade commelinoids).

== See also ==
- List of commelinid families

== Bibliography ==
- APG IV (2016). "An update of the Angiosperm Phylogeny Group classification for the orders and families of flowering plants: APG IV". Botanical Journal of the Linnean Society. 181 (1): 1–20. doi:10.1111/boj.12385.
- Barrett, Craig F.; Baker, William J.; Comer, Jason R.; Conran, John G.; Lahmeyer, Sean C.; Leebens-Mack, James H.; Li, Jeff; Lim, Gwynne S.; Mayfield-Jones, Dustin R.; Perez, Leticia; Medina, Jesus; Pires, J. Chris; Santos, Cristian; Wm. Stevenson, Dennis; Zomlefer, Wendy B.; Davis, Jerrold I. (January 2016). "Plastid genomes reveal support for deep phylogenetic relationships and extensive rate variation among palms and other commelinid monocots". New Phytologist. 209 (2): 855–870. Bibcode:2016NewPh.209..855B. doi:10.1111/nph.13617. PMID 26350789.
- Dahlgren, R. M. T.; Clifford, H. T.; Yeo, P. F. (1985). The Families of the Monocotyledons: Structure, Evolution, and Taxonomy. Berlin: Springer-Verlag. ISBN 978-3-540-13655-2.
- Harris, P.J.; Hartley, R.D. (1976). "Detection of bound ferulic acid in cell walls of the Gramineae by ultraviolet fluorescence microscopy". Nature. 259 (5543): 508–510. Bibcode:1976Natur.259..508H. doi:10.1038/259508a0. S2CID 4272319.
