= Juncales =

Order of flowering plants

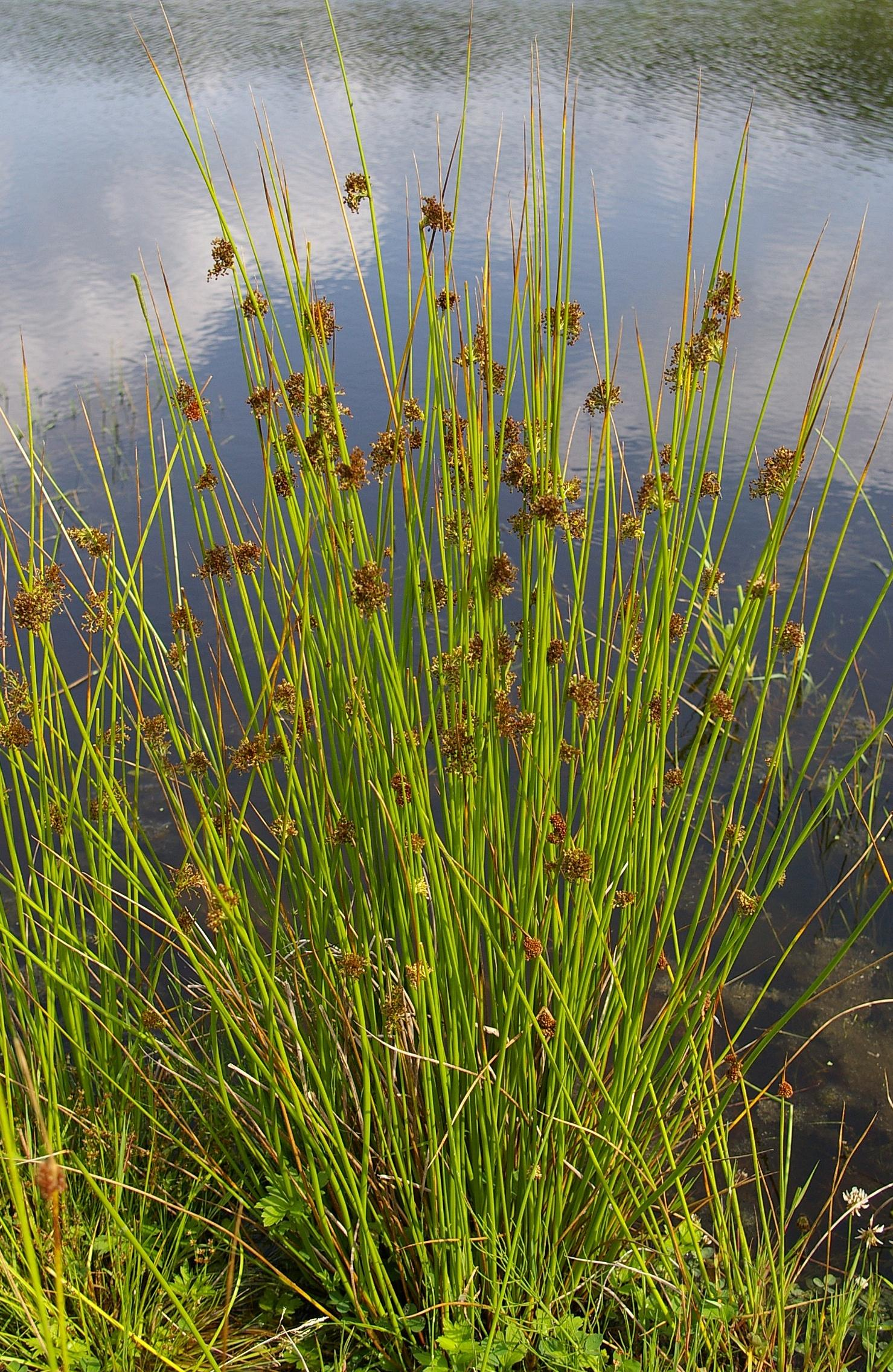
Juncus effusus

Juncales is an order of flowering plants. In the Engler system (update, of 1964) and in the Cronquist system (of 1981, which placed this order in subclass Commelinidae) it is circumscribed as:

- order Juncales
  family Juncaceae
  family Thurniaceae

However, the Thorne system (1992) accepts it as consisting of :

- order Juncales
  family Prioniaceae
  family Thurniaceae
  family Juncaceae
  family Cyperaceae

The APG II system, used here, assigns the plants involved to the order Poales.
