= Restionales =

Order of plants

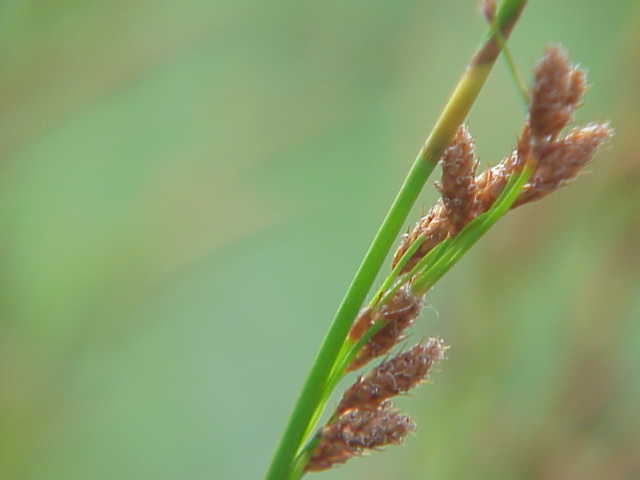
Restio tetraphyllus

Restionales is an order of flowering plants. In the Cronquist system (of 1981) it is used for an order (in subclass Commelinidae) and circumscribed as:

- order Restionales
  family Flagellariaceae
  family Joinvilleaceae
  family Restionaceae
  family Centrolepidaceae

The APG II system (2003) assigns the plants involved to the order Poales.
