= Alismatidae =

Subclass of flowering plants

Alismatidae is a botanical name at the rank of subclass. Circumscription of the subclass will vary with the taxonomic system being used (there are many such systems); the only requirement being that it includes the family Alismataceae. It is a relatively new name: earlier systems, such as the Engler and Wettstein systems, used the name Helobiae for a comparable unit.

== Alismatidae in the Takhtajan system ==
The Takhtajan system treats this as one of six subclasses within the class Liliopsida (=monocotyledons). It consists of:

- subclass Alismatidae
  superorder Alismatanae
  order Butomales
  order Hydrocharitales
  order Najadales
  order Alismatales
  order Aponogetonales
  order Juncaginales
  order Potamogetonales
  order Posidoniales
  order Cymodoceales
  order Zosterales

== Alismatidae in the Cronquist system ==
The Cronquist system treats this as one of four subclasses within the class Liliopsida (=monocotyledons). It consists of (1981):

- subclass Alismatidae
  order Alismatales
  order Hydrocharitales
  order Najadales
  order Triuridales

This subclass comprises less than five hundred species total: many of these are aquatic or semiaquatic plants (see Alismatidae info).

== APG II system ==
The APG II system does not use formal botanical names above the rank of order; it assigns most of the plants involved to the (expanded) order Alismatales, in the clade 'monocots', although the plants in Cronquist's order Triuridales are assigned to quite different placements.
