= Cronquist system =

System of flowering plant classification

The Cronquist system is a taxonomic classification system of flowering plants. It was developed by Arthur Cronquist in a series of monographs and texts, including The Evolution and Classification of Flowering Plants (1968; 2nd edition, 1988) and An Integrated System of Classification of Flowering Plants (1981) (see Bibliography).

Cronquist's system places flowering plants into two broad classes, Magnoliopsida (dicotyledons) and Liliopsida (monocotyledons). Within these classes, related orders are grouped into subclasses. While the scheme was widely used, in either the original form or in adapted versions, many botanists now use the Angiosperm Phylogeny Group classification for the orders and families of flowering plants, first developed in 1998. The system as laid out in Cronquist's An Integrated System of Classification of Flowering Plants (1981) counts 64 orders and 321 families in class Magnoliopsida and 19 orders and 65 families in class Liliopsida.

== The Evolution and Classification of Flowering Plants 1968 (monocots) ==
Class Liliatae (Monocotyledoneae)

- Subclass Alismatidae (4 orders)
  - Order Alismatales
  - Order Hydrocharitales
  - Order Najadales
  - Order Triuridales
- Subclass Commelinidae (8 orders)
  - Order Commelinales
  - Order Eriocaulales
  - Order Restionales
  - Order Juncales
  - Order Cyperales
  - Order Typhales
  - Order Bromeliales
  - Order Zingiberales
- Subclass Arecidae (4 orders)
  - Order Arecales
  - Order Cyclanthales
  - Order Pandanales
  - Order Arales
- Subclass Liliidae (2 orders)
  - Order Liliales
    - Family Philydraceae
    - Family Pontederiaceae
    - Family Liliaceae (Alluaceae, Alstroemeriaceae, Aphyllanthaceae, Amaryllidaceae, Asparagaceae, Colchicaceae, Hypoxidaceae, Melanthiaceae, Petermanniaceae, Philesiaceae, Ruscaceae, Trilliaceae)
    - Family Iridaceae
    - Family Agavaceae
    - Family Xanthorrhoeaceae
    - Family Velloziaceae
    - Family Haemodoraceae (Tecophilaeceae)
    - Family Taccaceae
    - Family Cyanastraceae
    - Family Stemonaceae (Roxburghiaceae)
    - Family Smilacaceae
    - Family Dioscoreaceae (Stenomeridaceae, Trichopodaceae)
  - Order Orchidales
    - Family Geosiridaceae
    - Family Burmanniaceae (Thismiaceae)
    - Family Corsiaceae
    - Family Orchidaceae (Apostasiaceae)

== An Integrated System of Classification of Flowering Plants 1981 ==
=== Class Magnoliopsida (dicotyledons) ===
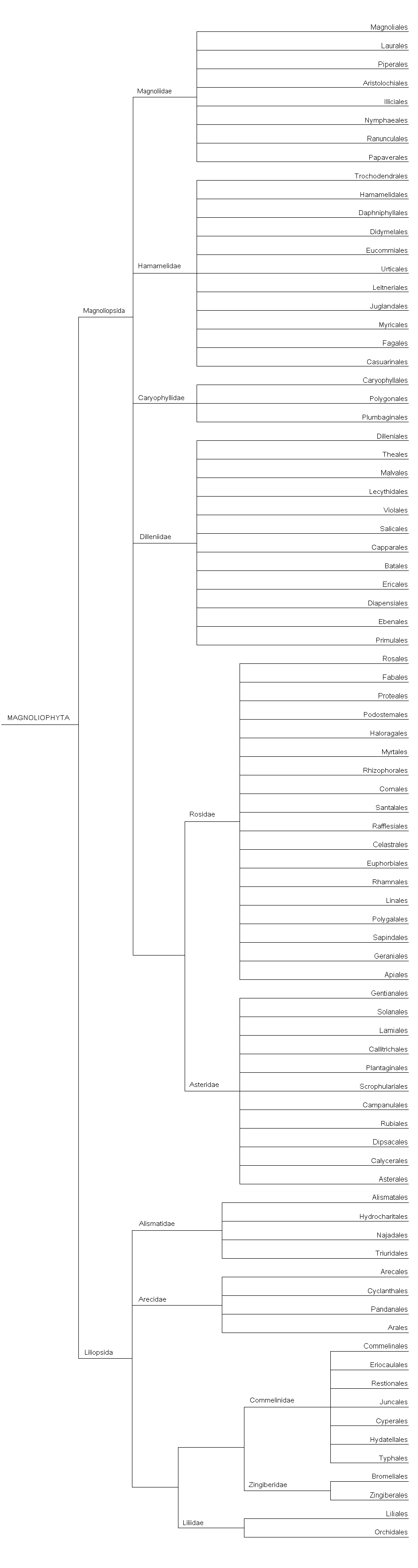
Cronquist system diagram

1. Subclass Magnoliidae (mostly basal dicots)
  1. Order Magnoliales
    1. Winteraceae
    2. Degeneriaceae
    3. Himantandraceae
    4. Eupomatiaceae
    5. Austrobaileyaceae
    6. Magnoliaceae (magnolia family)
    7. Lactoridaceae
    8. Annonaceae
    9. Myristicaceae
    10. Canellaceae
  2. Order Laurales
    1. Amborellaceae
    2. Trimeniaceae
    3. Monimiaceae
    4. Gomortegaceae
    5. Calycanthaceae
    6. Idiospermaceae (now part of Calycanthaceae)
    7. Lauraceae (laurel family)
    8. Hernandiaceae
  3. Order Piperales
    1. Chloranthaceae
    2. Saururaceae
    3. Piperaceae (pepper family)
  4. Order Aristolochiales
    1. Aristolochiaceae
  5. Order Illiciales
    1. Illiciaceae
    2. Schisandraceae
  6. Order Nymphaeales
    1. Nelumbonaceae (lotus family)
    2. Nymphaeaceae (waterlily family)
    3. Barclayaceae
    4. Cabombaceae
    5. Ceratophyllaceae
  7. Order Ranunculales
    1. Ranunculaceae (buttercup family)
    2. Circaeasteraceae
    3. Berberidaceae
    4. Sargentodoxaceae
    5. Lardizabalaceae
    6. Menispermaceae
    7. Coriariaceae
    8. Sabiaceae
  8. Order Papaverales
    1. Papaveraceae (poppy family)
    2. Fumariaceae
2. Subclass Hamamelidae [sic: correctly Hamamelididae]
  1. Order Trochodendrales
    1. Tetracentraceae
    2. Trochodendraceae
  2. Order Hamamelidales
    1. Cercidiphyllaceae
    2. Eupteleaceae
    3. Platanaceae
    4. Hamamelidaceae
    5. Myrothamnaceae
  3. Order Daphniphyllales
    1. Daphniphyllaceae
  4. Order Didymelales
    1. Didymelaceae
  5. Order Eucommiales
    1. Eucommiaceae
  6. Order Urticales
    1. Barbeyaceae
    2. Ulmaceae
    3. Cannabaceae (cannabis family)
    4. Moraceae (mulberry family)
    5. Cecropiaceae
    6. Urticaceae
  7. Order Leitneriales
    1. Leitneriaceae
  8. Order Juglandales
    1. Rhoipteleaceae
    2. Juglandaceae
  9. Order Myricales
    1. Myricaceae
  10. Order Fagales
    1. Balanopaceae
    2. Ticodendraceae
    3. Fagaceae
    4. Nothofagaceae
    5. Betulaceae
  11. Order Casuarinales
    1. Casuarinaceae
3. Subclass Caryophyllidae
  1. Order Caryophyllales
    1. Phytolaccaceae
    2. Achatocarpaceae
    3. Nyctaginaceae
    4. Aizoaceae
    5. Didiereaceae
    6. Cactaceae (cactus family)
    7. Chenopodiaceae
    8. Amaranthaceae
    9. Portulacaceae
    10. Basellaceae
    11. Molluginaceae
    12. Caryophyllaceae
  2. Order Polygonales
    1. Polygonaceae
  3. Order Plumbaginales
    1. Plumbaginaceae
4. Subclass Dilleniidae
  1. Order Dilleniales
    1. Dilleniaceae
    2. Paeoniaceae
  2. Order Theales
    1. Ochnaceae
    2. Sphaerosepalaceae
    3. Sarcolaenaceae
    4. Dipterocarpaceae
    5. Caryocaraceae
    6. Theaceae (tea family)
    7. Actinidiaceae (kiwi family)
    8. Scytopetalaceae
    9. Pentaphylacaceae
    10. Tetrameristaceae
    11. Pellicieraceae
    12. Oncothecaceae
    13. Marcgraviaceae
    14. Quiinaceae
    15. Elatinaceae
    16. Paracryphiaceae
    17. Medusagynaceae
    18. Clusiaceae
  3. Order Malvales
    1. Elaeocarpaceae
    2. Tiliaceae
    3. Sterculiaceae
    4. Bombacaceae
    5. Malvaceae (mallow family)
  4. Order Lecythidales
    1. Lecythidaceae
  5. Order Nepenthales
    1. Sarraceniaceae
    2. Nepenthaceae
    3. Droseraceae
  6. Order Violales
    1. Flacourtiaceae
    2. Peridiscaceae
    3. Bixaceae
    4. Cistaceae (rock rose family)
    5. Huaceae
    6. Lacistemataceae
    7. Scyphostegiaceae
    8. Stachyuraceae
    9. Violaceae (violet family)
    10. Tamaricaceae (tamarix family)
    11. Frankeniaceae
    12. Dioncophyllaceae
    13. Ancistrocladaceae
    14. Turneraceae
    15. Malesherbiaceae
    16. Passifloraceae (passionflower family)
    17. Achariaceae
    18. Caricaceae (papaya family)
    19. Fouquieriaceae
    20. Hoplestigmataceae
    21. Cucurbitaceae (squash family)
    22. Datiscaceae
    23. Begoniaceae
    24. Loasaceae
  7. Order Salicales
    1. Salicaceae
  8. Order Capparales
    1. Tovariaceae
    2. Capparaceae
    3. Brassicaceae (mustard family)
    4. Moringaceae
    5. Resedaceae
  9. Order Batales
    1. Gyrostemonaceae
    2. Bataceae
  10. Order Ericales
    1. Cyrillaceae
    2. Clethraceae
    3. Grubbiaceae
    4. Empetraceae
    5. Epacridaceae
    6. Ericaceae
    7. Pyrolaceae
    8. Monotropaceae
  11. Order Diapensiales
    1. Diapensiaceae
  12. Order Ebenales
    1. Sapotaceae
    2. Ebenaceae
    3. Styracaceae
    4. Lissocarpaceae
    5. Symplocaceae
  13. Order Primulales
    1. Theophrastaceae
    2. Myrsinaceae
    3. Primulaceae (primula family)
5. Subclass Rosidae
  1. Order Rosales
    1. Brunelliaceae
    2. Connaraceae
    3. Eucryphiaceae
    4. Cunoniaceae
    5. Davidsoniaceae
    6. Dialypetalanthaceae
    7. Pittosporaceae
    8. Byblidaceae
    9. Hydrangeaceae
    10. Columelliaceae
    11. Grossulariaceae
    12. Greyiaceae
    13. Bruniaceae
    14. Anisophylleaceae
    15. Alseuosmiaceae
    16. Crassulaceae
    17. Cephalotaceae
    18. Saxifragaceae
    19. Rosaceae (rose family)
    20. Neuradaceae
    21. Crossosomataceae
    22. Chrysobalanaceae
    23. Surianaceae
    24. Rhabdodendraceae
  2. Order Fabales
    1. Mimosaceae (mimosa family)
    2. Caesalpiniaceae
    3. Fabaceae (legume/pea family)
  3. Order Proteales
    1. Elaeagnaceae
    2. Proteaceae
  4. Order Podostemales
    1. Podostemaceae
  5. Order Haloragales
    1. Haloragaceae
    2. Gunneraceae
  6. Order Myrtales
    1. Sonneratiaceae
    2. Lythraceae
    3. Penaeaceae
    4. Crypteroniaceae
    5. Thymelaeaceae
    6. Trapaceae
    7. Myrtaceae (myrtle family)
    8. Punicaceae
    9. Onagraceae
    10. Oliniaceae
    11. Melastomataceae
    12. Combretaceae
    13. Alzateaceae
    14. Memecylaceae
    15. Rhyncocalycaceae
  7. Order Rhizophorales
    1. Rhizophoraceae
  8. Order Cornales
    1. Alangiaceae
    2. Nyssaceae
    3. Cornaceae
    4. Garryaceae
  9. Order Santalales
    1. Medusandraceae
    2. Dipentodontaceae
    3. Olacaceae
    4. Opiliaceae
    5. Santalaceae
    6. Misodendraceae
    7. Loranthaceae
    8. Viscaceae
    9. Eremolepidaceae
    10. Balanophoraceae
  10. Order Rafflesiales
    1. Hydnoraceae
    2. Mitrastemonaceae
    3. Rafflesiaceae (rafflesia family)
  11. Order Celastrales
    1. Geissolomataceae
    2. Celastraceae
    3. Hippocrateaceae
    4. Stackhousiaceae
    5. Salvadoraceae
    6. Aquifoliaceae
    7. Icacinaceae
    8. Aextoxicaceae
    9. Cardiopteridaceae
    10. Corynocarpaceae
    11. Dichapetalaceae
    12. Tepuianthaceae
  12. Order Euphorbiales
    1. Buxaceae (box family)
    2. Simmondsiaceae
    3. Pandaceae
    4. Euphorbiaceae
  13. Order Rhamnales
    1. Rhamnaceae
    2. Leeaceae
    3. Vitaceae (grape family)
  14. Order Linales
    1. Erythroxylaceae
    2. Humiriaceae
    3. Ixonanthaceae
    4. Hugoniaceae
    5. Linaceae
  15. Order Polygalales
    1. Malpighiaceae
    2. Vochysiaceae
    3. Trigoniaceae
    4. Tremandraceae
    5. Polygalaceae
    6. Xanthophyllaceae
    7. Krameriaceae
  16. Order Sapindales
    1. Staphyleaceae
    2. Melianthaceae
    3. Bretschneideraceae
    4. Akaniaceae
    5. Sapindaceae
    6. Hippocastanaceae
    7. Aceraceae
    8. Burseraceae
    9. Anacardiaceae (cashew family)
    10. Julianiaceae
    11. Simaroubaceae
    12. Cneoraceae
    13. Meliaceae
    14. Rutaceae (citrus family)
    15. Zygophyllaceae
  17. Order Geraniales
    1. Oxalidaceae
    2. Geraniaceae
    3. Limnanthaceae
    4. Tropaeolaceae
    5. Balsaminaceae
  18. Order Apiales
    1. Araliaceae
    2. Apiaceae (carrot family)
6. Subclass Asteridae
  1. Order Gentianales
    1. Loganiaceae
    2. Retziaceae
    3. Gentianaceae
    4. Saccifoliaceae
    5. Apocynaceae
    6. Asclepiadaceae
  2. Order Solanales
    1. Duckeodendraceae
    2. Nolanaceae
    3. Solanaceae (nightshade/tomato family)
    4. Convolvulaceae
    5. Cuscutaceae
    6. Menyanthaceae
    7. Polemoniaceae
    8. Hydrophyllaceae
    9. Retziaceae
  3. Order Lamiales
    1. Lennoaceae
    2. Boraginaceae
    3. Verbenaceae
    4. Lamiaceae (mint family)
  4. Order Callitrichales
    1. Hippuridaceae
    2. Callitrichaceae
    3. Hydrostachyaceae
  5. Order Plantaginales
    1. Plantaginaceae
  6. Order Scrophulariales
    1. Buddlejaceae
    2. Oleaceae (olive family)
    3. Scrophulariaceae
    4. Globulariaceae
    5. Myoporaceae
    6. Orobanchaceae
    7. Gesneriaceae
    8. Acanthaceae
    9. Pedaliaceae
    10. Bignoniaceae
    11. Mendonciaceae
    12. Lentibulariaceae
  7. Order Campanulales
    1. Pentaphragmataceae
    2. Sphenocleaceae
    3. Campanulaceae (bell flower family)
    4. Stylidiaceae
    5. Donatiaceae
    6. Brunoniaceae
    7. Goodeniaceae
  8. Order Rubiales
    1. Rubiaceae (coffee family)
    2. Theligonaceae
  9. Order Dipsacales
    1. Caprifoliaceae
    2. Adoxaceae
    3. Valerianaceae
    4. Dipsacaceae
  10. Order Calycerales
    1. Calyceraceae
  11. Order Asterales
    1. Asteraceae (sunflower family)

=== Class Liliopsida (monocotyledons) ===
1. Subclass Alismatidae
  1. Order Alismatales
    1. Butomaceae
    2. Limnocharitaceae
    3. Alismataceae
  2. Order Hydrocharitales
    1. Hydrocharitaceae
  3. Order Najadales
    1. Aponogetonaceae
    2. Scheuchzeriaceae
    3. Juncaginaceae
    4. Potamogetonaceae
    5. Ruppiaceae
    6. Najadaceae
    7. Zannichelliaceae
    8. Posidoniaceae
    9. Cymodoceaceae
    10. Zosteraceae
  4. Order Triuridales
    1. Petrosaviaceae
    2. Triuridaceae
2. Subclass Arecidae
  1. Order Arecales
    1. Arecaceae (palm family)
  2. Order Cyclanthales
    1. Cyclanthaceae
  3. Order Pandanales
    1. Pandanaceae (pandan family)
  4. Order Arales
    1. Acoraceae
    2. Araceae
    3. Lemnaceae
3. Subclass Commelinidae
  1. Order Commelinales
    1. Rapateaceae
    2. Xyridaceae
    3. Mayacaceae
    4. Commelinaceae
  2. Order Eriocaulales
    1. Eriocaulaceae
  3. Order Restionales
    1. Flagellariaceae
    2. Joinvilleaceae
    3. Restionaceae
    4. Centrolepidaceae
  4. Order Juncales
    1. Juncaceae
    2. Thurniaceae
  5. Order Cyperales
    1. Cyperaceae
    2. Poaceae (grass family)
  6. Order Hydatellales
    1. Hydatellaceae
  7. Order Typhales
    1. Sparganiaceae
    2. Typhaceae
4. Subclass Zingiberidae
  1. Order Bromeliales
    1. Bromeliaceae
  2. Order Zingiberales
    1. Strelitziaceae
    2. Heliconiaceae
    3. Musaceae
    4. Lowiaceae
    5. Zingiberaceae (ginger family)
    6. Costaceae
    7. Cannaceae
    8. Marantaceae
5. Subclass Liliidae
  1. Order Liliales
    1. Philydraceae
    2. Pontederiaceae
    3. Haemodoraceae
    4. Cyanastraceae
    5. Liliaceae (lily family)
    6. Iridaceae (iris family)
    7. Velloziaceae
    8. Aloeaceae (aloe family)
    9. Agavaceae
    10. Xanthorrhoeaceae
    11. Hanguanaceae
    12. Taccaceae
    13. Stemonaceae
    14. Smilacaceae
    15. Dioscoreaceae
  2. Order Orchidales
    1. Geosiridaceae
    2. Burmanniaceae
    3. Corsiaceae
    4. Orchidaceae (orchid family)

== Bibliography ==
- Texas A and M University Bioinformatics Working Group : Cronquist System Archived 2014-12-11 at the Wayback Machine
- Reveal, James (4 October 1998). "Cronquist Family Names and Synonymy". Indices Nominum Supragenericorum Plantarum Project. University of Maryland: Norton-Brown Herbarium.
- Reveal, James (22 November 1998). "Lists of the Flowering Plant Taxa Accepted by Cronquist, Dahlgren, Reveal, Takhtajan & Thorne". Vascular Plant Family Nomenclature. University of Maryland: Norton-Brown Herbarium.

=== Work by Cronquist ===
- Cronquist, Arthur. (1957). Outline of a new system of families and orders of dicotyledons. Bull. Jard. Bot. Etat Brux. 27: 13–40.
- Cronquist, Arthur (October 1960). "The divisions and classes of plants". The Botanical Review. 26 (4): 425–482. Bibcode:1960BotRv..26..425C. doi:10.1007/BF02940572. S2CID 43144314.
- Cronquist, Arthur (September 1965). "The Status of the General System of Classification of Flowering Plants". Annals of the Missouri Botanical Garden. 52 (3): 281–303. Bibcode:1965AnMBG..52..281C. doi:10.2307/2394794. JSTOR 2394794.
- Cronquist, Arthur; Takhtajan, Armen; Zimmermann, Walter (April 1966). "On the Higher Taxa of Embryobionta". Taxon. 15 (4): 129–134. Bibcode:1966Taxon..15..129C. doi:10.2307/1217531. JSTOR 1217531.
- Cronquist, A (1981). An integrated system of classification of flowering plants. New York: Columbia University Press. ISBN 9780231038805.
- Cronquist, A (1968). The evolution and classification of flowering plants (1st ed.). Boston: Houghton Mufflin Company.
- Cronquist, A (1988) [1968]. The evolution and classification of flowering plants (2nd ed.). Bronx, NY: New York Botanical Garden. ISBN 9780893273323.
  - Excerpt: Classification. 7 pp.
