= Orchidales =

Order of orchids

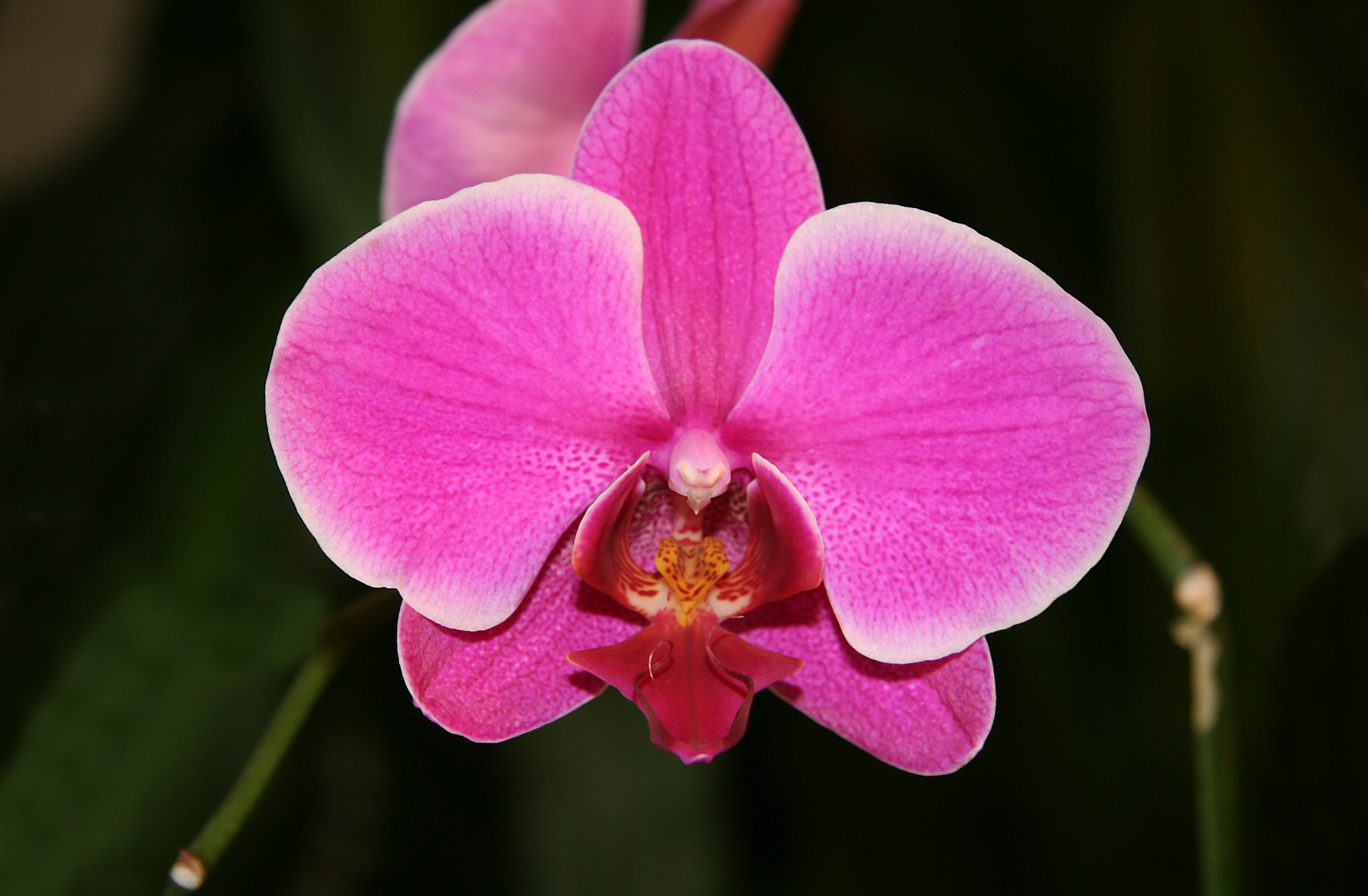
Phalaenopsis orchid

Orchidales is an order of flowering plants. In taxonomical systems, this is a relatively recent name as early systems used descriptive botanical names for the order containing the orchids. The Bentham & Hooker and the Engler systems had the orchids in order Microspermae while the Wettstein system treats them as order Gynandrae (a descriptive name referring to the stamens). In taxonomical systems these two descriptive names have now mostly dropped out of use.

Circumscription of the order will vary with the taxonomic system being used. Although mostly the order will consist of the orchids only (usually in one family only, but sometimes divided into more families, as in the Dahlgren system, see below), sometimes other families are added:

== Circumscription in the Takhtajan system ==
Takhtajan system:

- order Orchidales
  family Orchidaceae

== Circumscription in the Cronquist system ==
Cronquist system (1981):

- order Orchidales
  family Geosiridaceae
  family Burmanniaceae
  family Corsiaceae
  family Orchidaceae

== Circumscription in the Dahlgren system ==
Dahlgren system:

- order Orchidales
  family Neuwiediaceae
  family Apostasiaceae
  family Cypripediaceae
  family Orchidaceae

== Circumscription in the Thorne system ==
Thorne system (1992):

- order Orchidales
  family Orchidaceae

== Circumscription in the Wettstein system ==
Wettstein system

- order Gynandrae
  family Orchideae

== APG system ==
The order is not recognized in the APG II system, which assigns the orchids to order Asparagales.

== See also ==
- Taxonomy of the orchid family
