= Triuridales =

Extinct order of flowering plants

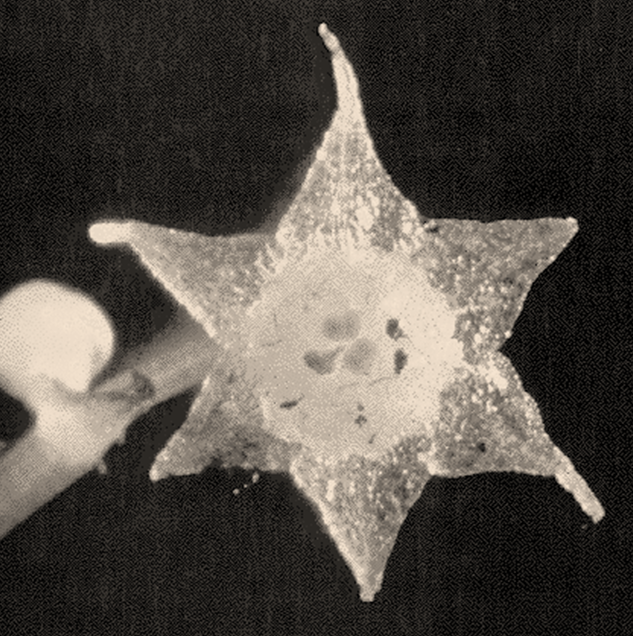

Triuridales was an order of flowering plants that was used in the Cronquist system, in the subclass Alismatidae. It used the following circumscription:

- order Triuridales
  family Petrosaviaceae
  family Triuridaceae

In the classification system of Dahlgren the Triuridales contained the single family Triuridaceae and was the sole order in the superorder Triuridiflorae (also called Triuridanae).

The APG II system leaves the first of these two families unassigned in the clade monocots while the second is moved to order Pandanales. In the APG III and APG IV systems the second is placed in the monotypic order Petrosaviales.
