= Typhales =

Order of flowering plants

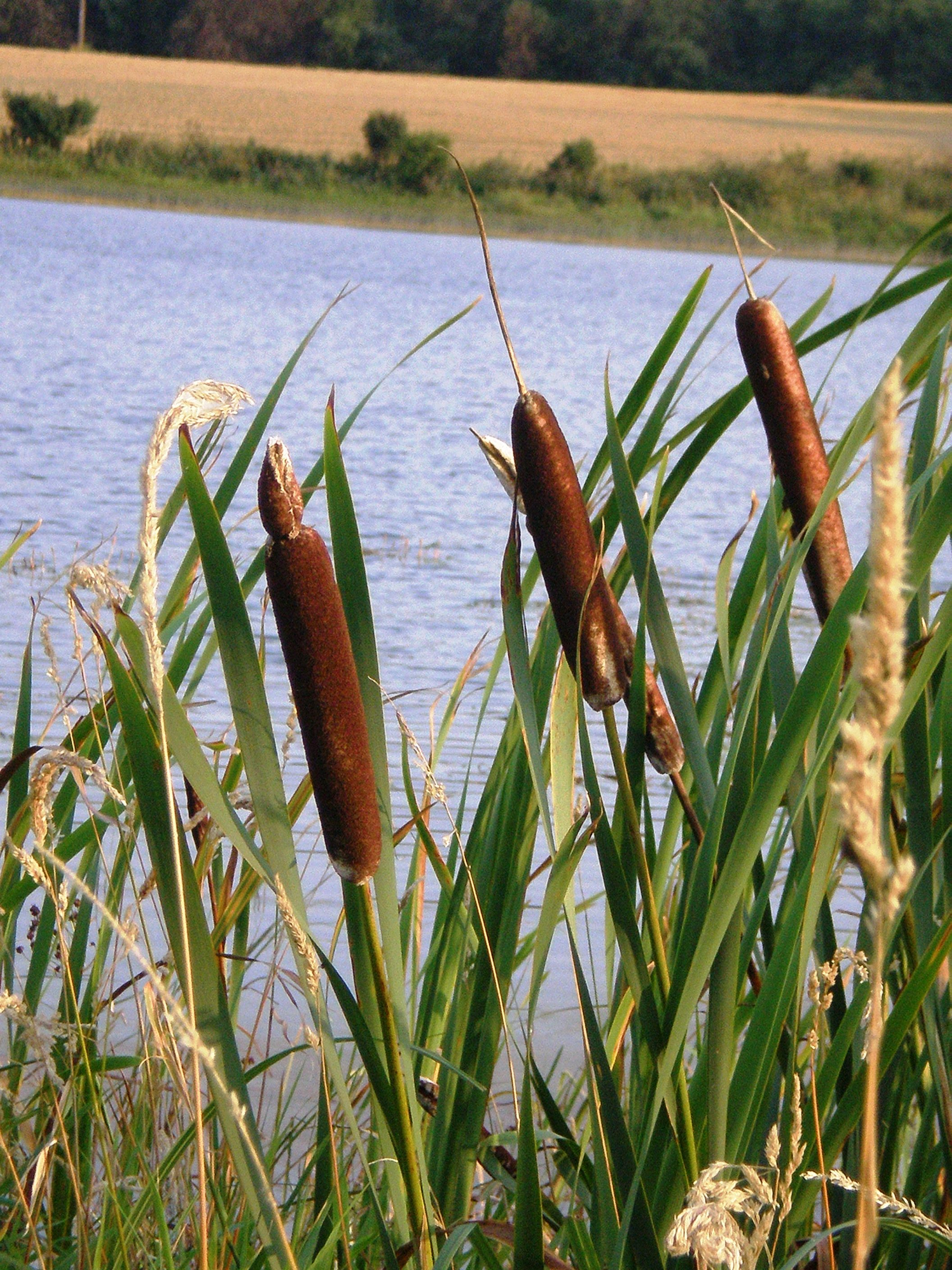
Typha latifolia

Typhales is a botanical name for an order of flowering plants. In the Cronquist system the name was used for an order placed in the subclass Commelinidae. The order consisted of (1981):

- order Typhales
  family Sparganiaceae
  family Typhaceae

The APG IV system, used here, assigns the plants involved to the order Poales.
