= Arales =

Order of flowering plants

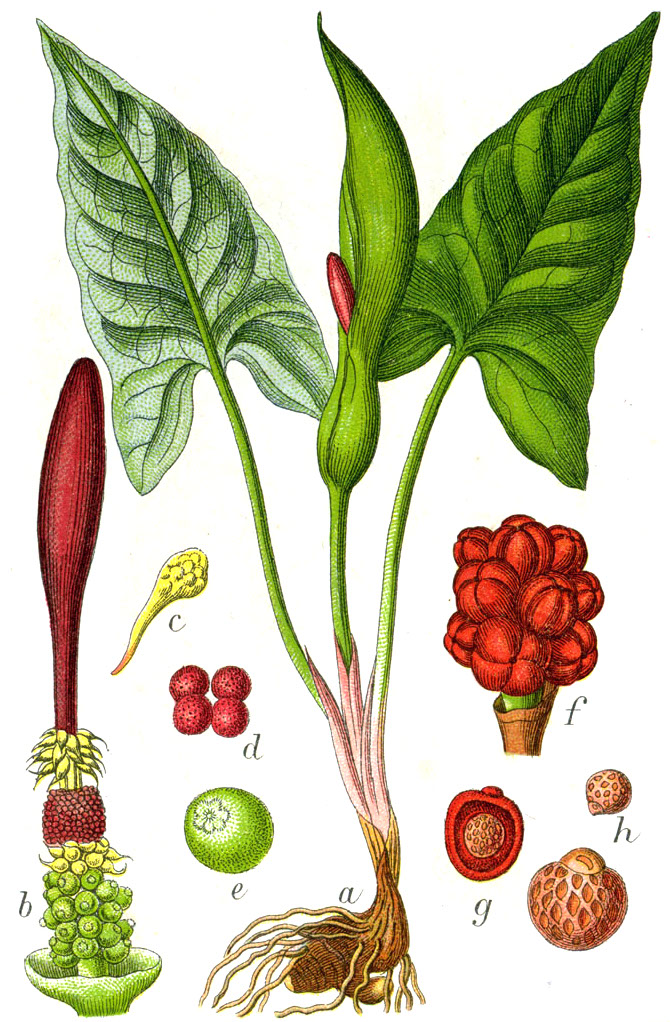
Arum maculatum

Arales is an order of flowering plants. The name was used in the Cronquist system for an order placed in subclass Arecidae, circumscribed as (1981):

- order Arales
  family Acoraceae
  family Araceae
  family Lemnaceae

In the classification system of Dahlgren the Arales were in the superorder Ariflorae (also called Aranae), but did not include Acoraceae as a separate family. Instead, Acorus, its only genus, was included in the Araceae. Arales was the only order included in the Ariflorae.

The APG II system elevates the first of these three families to become an order Acorales of its own (consisting of the single genus, Acorus) and unites the last two of these families into the one family Araceae, assigning this to the order Alismatales.
