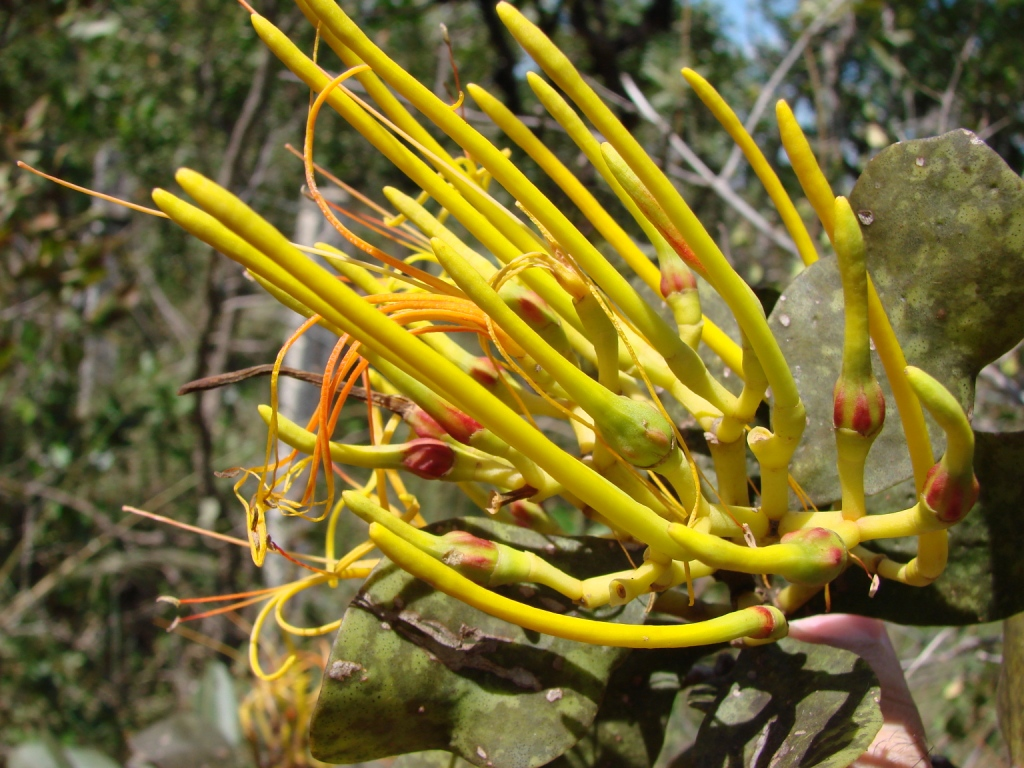
- Psittacanthus robustus

Scientific classification
- Kingdom: Plantae
- Clade: Embryophytes
- Clade: Tracheophytes
- Clade: Spermatophytes
- Clade: Angiosperms
- Clade: Eudicots
- Order: Santalales
- Family: Loranthaceae
- Genus: Psittacanthus; Mart.

Species
- See text

= Psittacanthus =

Genus of parasitic flowering plants

Psittacanthus, also parrot-flower, is a plant genus in the family Loranthaceae. It is a type of mistletoe native from central Mexico southwards to Central America and parts of South America.

It differs from most other Loranthaceae genera by its large flowers and bulky haustorial connections to its host, and by its large fruits. Its flowers frequently "light up the host tree in brilliant hues of red or red and yellow".

== Life cycle ==
From inoculation of a branch with the seed to production of new seed on the plant requires about five years. Psittacanthus is dispersed by birds feeding on fruits and defecating on branches. Once the mistletoe is established, it flowers yearly. A five-year study of Psittacanthus calyculatus on Pinus gordoniana found that only five months after the sticky seed has inoculated the host tree, the first true leaves are produced. In the May of the fourth year after infection, the shoots start to produce flower bud full flowering and pollination occurring in November and December. Hummingbirds and passerines are thought to be the pollinators. Fruit maturation takes about a year and occurs from November to February of the fifth year. The long life cycle means that infestations may be relatively easily controlled when trees are to be harvested for forestry.

== Accepted species ==
The following species are placed in this genus:

1. Psittacanthus acinarius (Mart.) Mart.
2. Psittacanthus amazonicus (Ule) Kuijt
3. Psittacanthus americanus (L.) Mart.
4. Psittacanthus angustifolius Kuijt
5. Psittacanthus auriculatus (Oliv.) Eichler
6. Psittacanthus bicalyculatus (Mart. ex Schult. & Schult.f.) Mart.
7. Psittacanthus biternatus (Hoffmanns.) G.Don
8. Psittacanthus brachynema Eichler
9. Psittacanthus brasiliensis (Desr.) G.Don
10. Psittacanthus breedlovei Kuijt
11. Psittacanthus calcaratus A.C.Sm.
12. Psittacanthus calyculatus (DC.) G.Don
13. Psittacanthus cardiphyllus (Willd. ex Schult. & Schult.f.) Eichler
14. Psittacanthus chanduyensis Eichler
15. Psittacanthus cinctus (Mart.) Mart.
16. Psittacanthus circulatus Rizzini
17. Psittacanthus clusiifolius Eichler
18. Psittacanthus coccineus Pacz.
19. Psittacanthus cordatus (Hoffmanns. ex Schult. & Schult.f.) G.Don
20. Psittacanthus cordiae K.Krause
21. Psittacanthus costanensis Steyerm.
22. Psittacanthus crassifolius Mart.
23. Psittacanthus cucullaris (Lam.) G.Don
24. Psittacanthus dichrous (Mart. ex Schult. & Schult.f.) Mart.
25. Psittacanthus dilatatus A.C.Sm.
26. Psittacanthus divaricatus (Kunth) G.Don
27. Psittacanthus eucalyptifolius (Kunth) G.Don
28. Psittacanthus gracilipes Rizzini
29. Psittacanthus grandifolius Mart.
30. Psittacanthus hamulifer Kuijt
31. Psittacanthus irwinii Rizzini
32. Psittacanthus julianus Rizzini
33. Psittacanthus karwinskyanus (Schult. & Schult.f.) Eichler
34. Psittacanthus kerberi Engl.
35. Psittacanthus krameri Kuijt
36. Psittacanthus krausei J.F.Macbr.
37. Psittacanthus lasianthus Sandwith
38. Psittacanthus gigas
39. Psittacanthus lasserianus Rizzini
40. Psittacanthus linearis (Killip) J.F.Macbr.
41. Psittacanthus macrantherus Eichler
42. Psittacanthus martinicensis (C.Presl) Eichler
43. Psittacanthus mayanus Standl. & Steyerm.
44. Psittacanthus melinonii (Tiegh.) Engl.
45. Psittacanthus mexicanus (C.Presl ex Schult. & Schult.f.) G.Don
46. Psittacanthus microphyllus Kuijt
47. Psittacanthus mirandensis Rizzini
47. Psittacanthus montis-neblinae Rizzini
48. Psittacanthus nodosissimus Rizzini
49. Psittacanthus nudus (Ant.Molina) Kuijt & Feuer
50. Psittacanthus oblongifolius (Rusby) Kuijt
51. Psittacanthus palmeri (S.Watson) Barlow & Wiens
52. Psittacanthus pangui Kuijt
53. Psittacanthus paxianus (Patsch.) Kuijt
54. Psittacanthus peculiaris A.C.Sm.
55. Psittacanthus peronopetalus Eichler
56. Psittacanthus pinicola Kuijt
57. Psittacanthus ramiflorus (Moc. & Sessé ex DC.) G.Don
58. Psittacanthus rhynchanthus (Benth.) Kuijt
59. Psittacanthus robustus (Mart.) Marloth
60. Psittacanthus scheryi Woodson
61. Psittacanthus schiedeanus (Schltdl. & Cham.) G.Don
62. Psittacanthus sonorae (S.Watson) Kuijt
63. Psittacanthus subalatus K.Krause
64. Psittacanthus truncatus Kuijt
65. Psittacanthus tumbecensis (Killip) J.F.Macbr.
66. Psittacanthus wiensii Kuijt
67. Psittacanthus zonatus (Diels) Kuijt

== Etymology ==
Psittacanthos comes from the Greek psittakos (parrot), and the Greek anthos (flower), possibly chosen, according to Don, because of the bright colours.
