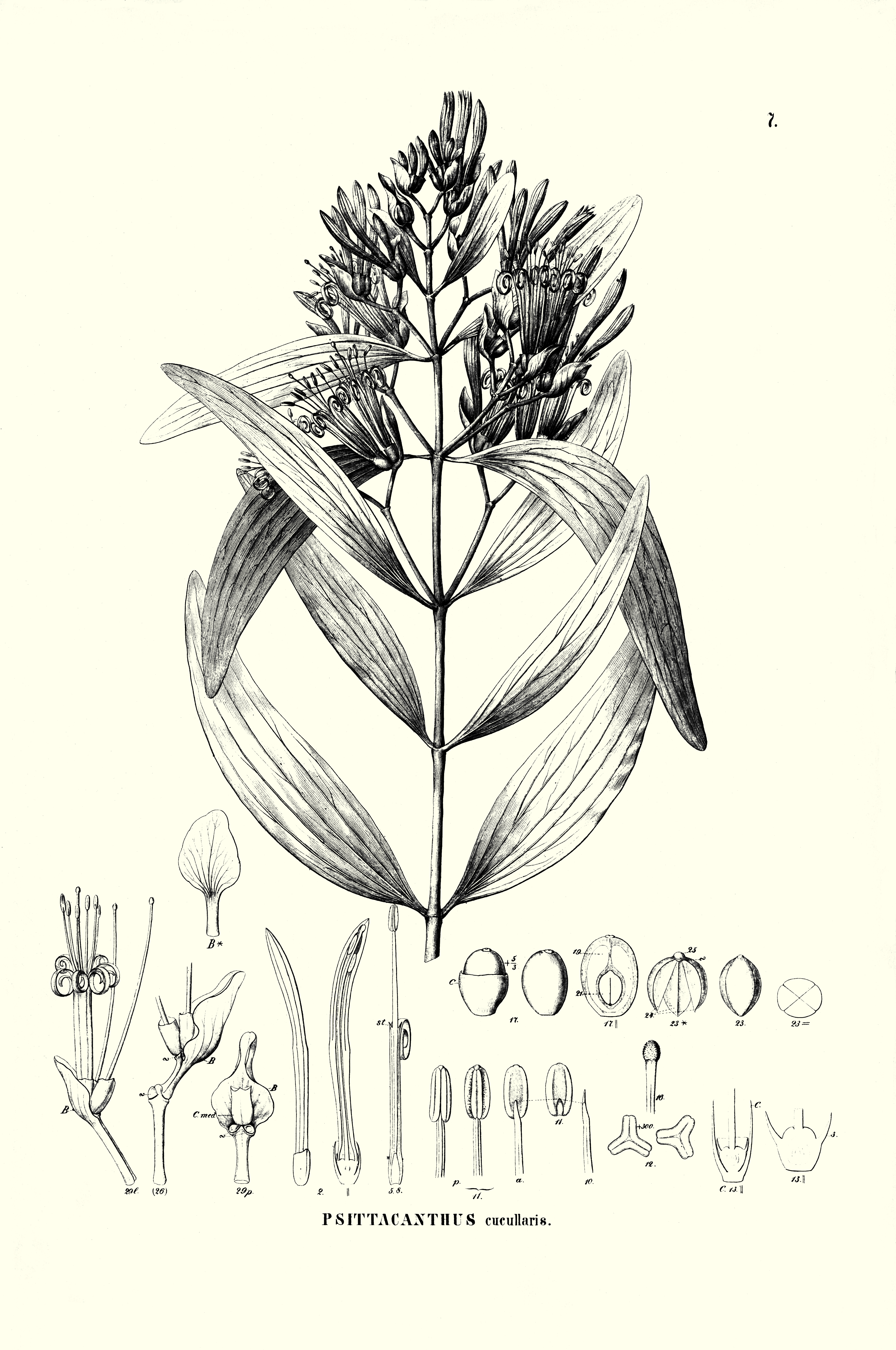

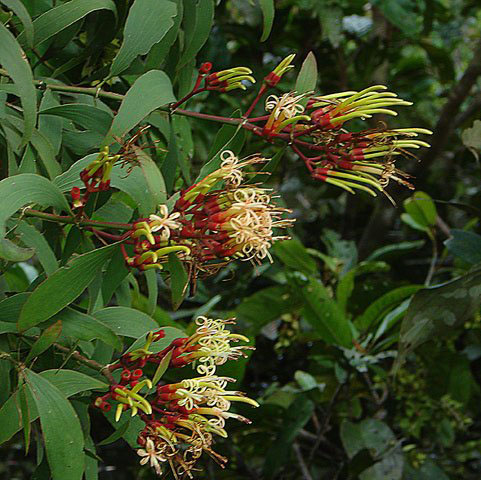

Scientific classification
- Kingdom: Plantae
- Clade: Tracheophytes
- Clade: Angiosperms
- Clade: Eudicots
- Order: Santalales
- Family: Loranthaceae
- Genus: Psittacanthus
- Species: P. cucullaris

Binomial name
- Psittacanthus cucullaris (Lam.) G.Don

Synonyms
- Apodina cupulifer (Kunth) Tiegh.; Arthraxon falcifrons (Mart.) Tiegh.; Hyphipus bracteata Raf.; Loranthus bracteatus Rich.; Loranthus cucullaris Lam.; Loranthus cupulifer Kunth; Loranthus falcifrons Mart.; Loranthus membranaceus Willd. ex Schult. & Schult.f.; Loranthus nitidus Willd. ex Eichler; Psittacanthus cupulifer (Kunth) G.Don; Psittacanthus falcifrons (Mart.) Mart.

= Psittacanthus cucullaris =

Species of mistletoe

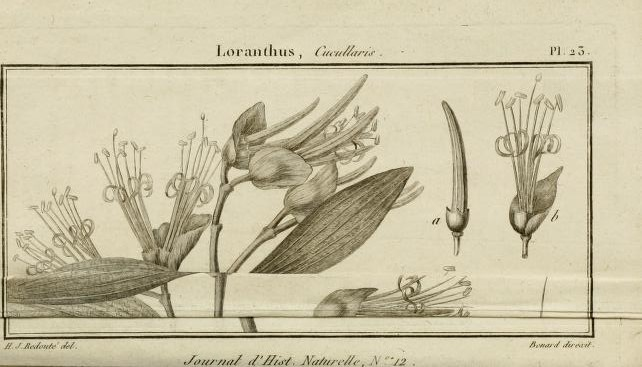
Pl 23 from Lamarck (1792)

Psittacanthus cucullaris is a species of mistletoe in the family Loranthaceae, and is native to Costa Rica, Bolivia, Colombia, Ecuador, French Guiana, Peru, Suriname, Venezuela and Brazil.

== Description ==
Psittacanthus cucullaris is a hemiparasite. The young stems grow upright, while adult stems are pendulous. In cross-section the young stems are ellipsoidal to circular and about 0.5–1 cm in diameter and 6–8 cm long, while adult branches have a circular cross-section which is up to 2 cm in diameter. The opposite and decurrent leaves are leathery and 15–20 cm long by 5–7 cm wide. They are falcate or ovate with an acute base and an acute or rounded apex. The petiole is 0.5 cm long with 3-5 obvious major ribs. Terminal and lateral racemose inflorescences occur at the apex of the branches. The greenish or red ovate flower bracts are persistent and 2.2 cm long by 1.8 cm wide. The flowers occur in sessile triads, with a main and secondary peduncle of the inflorescence which is 1–2 cm long. There is a pink or red dome beneath the flower which covers the calyx and base of the flower. The flower buds are 4.5-5.0 cm long, and straight with an acute apex. The petals are red, orange or yellow at the base and yellow or greenish at the apex. There are two forms of stamens. The anthers are 2.5-3.0 mm long and brown and the straight stylus is 4.0-4.5 cm long. The fruits are ovoid and 10–15 mm long by 9–12 mm wide, and are green when immature and black or purple when ripe and their base is encircled by the pink, orange or red subfloral dome. The seeds are 7–12 mm long by 5–7 mm wide and have 3-4 cotyledons.

It is easily recognized by the spiky leaves, the terminal and axillary inflorescences at the apex of the branches, the bracts that subtend the triads with sessile flowers, the revolute subfloral domes that surround the caliculum and the base of the flowers, which persist in the fruit.

== Habitat ==
In Brazil, it grows in the Amazon rainforest, the Central Brazilian savanna, and the Pantanal.

== Taxonomy ==
Psittacanthus cucullaris was first described by Jean-Baptiste Lamarck in 1792 as Loranthus cucullaris, and in 1834, George Don assigned it to the new genus Psittacanthus.

== Etymology ==
Psittacanthus comes from the Greek psittakos (parrot), and the Greek anthos (flower), chosen according to Don, possibly because of the bright colours. The species epithet, cucullaris, comes from the Latin, cucullus ("covering", "hood"), and the adjective, cucullaris, refers to the bracts which "cover" (hood) the inflorescence and the fruit, so both flower and fruit are "hooded".
