= Psittacanthus biternatus =

Scientific classification
- Kingdom: Plantae
- Clade: Tracheophytes
- Clade: Angiosperms
- Clade: Eudicots
- Order: Santalales
- Family: Loranthaceae
- Genus: Psittacanthus
- Species: P. biternatus

Binomial name
- Psittacanthus biternatus (Hoffmanns.) G.Don

Synonyms
- Loranthus biternatus Hoffmanns. Loranthus pohlii A.DC. Psittacanthus glaucocoma Eichler; Psittacanthus leiternetus (Hoffmanns.) Blume; Glossidea biternata (Hoffmanns.) Tiegh. Glossidea glaucocoma (Eichler) Tiegh.

Species of mistletoe

Psittacanthus biternatus is a species of mistletoe in the family Loranthaceae, which is native to Brazil, Venezuela, and Colombia.

== Description ==
Kuijt describes Psittacanthus biternatus as having:

- paired leaves are broadly obovate (egg shaped) to nearly round, with obtuse bases and apices rounded, with petioles 8–10 mm long, with often obscure palmate to pinnate venation;
- branches and stems are circular in cross-section;
- the inflorescence is axillary only;
- the peduncles of the inflorescence, of the triad, and the pedicel of the flower are all 6–7 mm long, and are red;
- the straight or nearly straight buds are about 4 cm long;
- all parts (including the inflorescence and buds) have short dense papillae (nipple like structures);
- the inner floral tube has red hairs below the anthers;
- the base of the style is smooth (glabrous);
- petals colored red at the base and orange or yellow at the apex;
- the ellipsoidal fruits are 10–12 mm long, 9–10 mm long; and are black when ripe, and are not crowned;
- the seeds are 7–9 mm long, 5 mm wide, and have 2-3 cotyledons.

It is hemiparasitic and has no epicortical roots.

Psittacanthus biternatus is distinguished from other Psittacanthus species by its generally obovate or circular leaves, its axillary inflorescences in the older branches and its main and secondary peduncles being red, and its uncrowned black fruit.

It flowers and fruits throughout the year and is pollinated by hummingbirds and dispersed by birds (tyrannids and traupids). It parasites several species of angiosperms, but more frequently Pouteria ramiflora, Byrsonima coccolobifolia and B. crassifolia.

== Distribution ==
In Brazil, it is found in the Amazon rainforest, Caatinga, Central Brazilian Savanna, and the Atlantic Rainforest, inhabiting the vegetation types of Caatinga, Amazonian Campinarana, Cerrado, riverine forest and/or gallery forest, Terra Firme Forest, Várzea forest, and coastal forest(Restinga).

== Taxonomy ==
Psittacanthus biternatus was first described by Johann Centurius Hoffmannsegg in 1829 as Loranthus biternatus, and in 1834, George Don reassigned it to the newly described genus Psittacanthus.

== Etymology ==
Psittacanthos comes from the Greek psittakos (parrot), and the Greek anthos (flower), possibly chosen, according to Don, because of the bright colours. The specific epithet, biternatus, is the Latin for twice ternate, which according to Stearn means each of the three main divisions, being itself divided in three. In this case, it refers to the inflorescence which is an umbel of triads, which is often a pair (see illustration on p 89 of Kuijt).
