= Psittacanthus acinarius =

Scientific classification
- Kingdom: Plantae
- Clade: Tracheophytes
- Clade: Angiosperms
- Clade: Eudicots
- Order: Santalales
- Family: Loranthaceae
- Genus: Psittacanthus
- Species: P. acinarius

Binomial name
- Psittacanthus acinarius (Mart.) Mart.

Synonyms
- Loranthus acinarius Mart.; Loranthus warmingii (Eichler) Danser; Meranthera corynocephala (Eichler) Tiegh. Psittacanthus corynocephalus Eichler; Psittacanthus warmingii Eichler

Species of plant

Psittacanthus acinarius is a species of mistletoe in the family Loranthaceae, which is native to Bolivia, Brazil, Colombia, Costa Rica, Ecuador, Peru, Venezuela, and French Guiana.

== Description ==
Psittacanthus acinarius has pendulous branches, which are circular in cross-section, except at the apex where the cross-section is slightly quadrangular. There are no epicortical roots. The petiolate, leathery leaves are opposite and of length 10–22 cm and width 6–15 cm, with the leaf base being acute or obtuse, the apex obtuse, rounded, with inconspicuous ribbing. The position of the inflorescence is terminal and has persistent non-fused bracts, with an umbel of pedunculate triads. The external colour of the petals is greenish; the internal colour is red and they have a straight style. The buds are long and straight with a dilated base and an acute apex. The stamens are dimorphic. The anthers are red and 7–8 mm in length. The stigma is globose and red. The fruit is ellipsoidal or ovoid, of length 20 mm, width 10 mm long, and when immature is reddish, and when ripe black. The seed has 4–6 cotyledons.

The terminal position of the inflorescences, the robust and fleshy aspect of the peduncles and flowers, the presence of the dilated sub-floral dome, and the greenish color of the flowers are distinctive characteristics of the species. It presents great variability in leaf format. In Brazil, it is one of the most common mistletoe species.

== Distribution ==
It is found in Bolivia, Brazil, Colombia, Costa Rica, Ecuador, Peru, Venezuela, and French Guiana.

In Brazil, it is found in the Amazon rainforest, Caatinga, Central Brazilian Savanna, and the Pantanal, inhabiting the vegetation types of Caatinga, Amazonian Campinarana, Cerrado, riverine forest and/or gallery forest, Igapó flooded forest, Terra Firme Forest, Várzea inundated forest), seasonally semideciduous forest, and the Amazonian Savanna.

== Taxonomy ==
Psittacanthus acinarius was first described by von Martius in 1829 as Loranthus acinarius, and in 1830, he reassigned it to his newly described genus Psittacanthus.

== Etymology ==
Psittacanthos comes from the Greek psittakos (parrot), and the Greek anthos (flower), possibly chosen, according to Don, because of the bright colours. The specific epithet, acinarius, is the Latin for designed for holding grapes.
