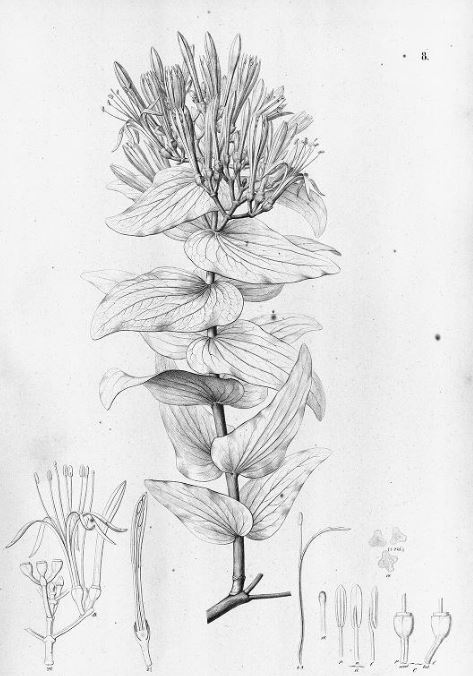
- Psittacanthus cordatus

Scientific classification
- Kingdom: Plantae
- Clade: Tracheophytes
- Clade: Angiosperms
- Clade: Eudicots
- Order: Santalales
- Family: Loranthaceae
- Genus: Psittacanthus
- Species: P. cordatus

Binomial name
- Psittacanthus cordatus (Hoffmanns.) G.Don
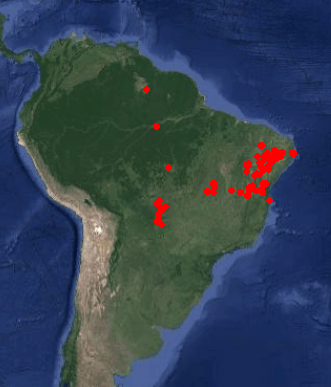
- Occurrence data from GBIF

Synonyms
- Arthraxon cordatus (Hoffmanns. ex Schult. & Schult.f.) Tiegh.; Loranthus cordatus Hoffmanns. ex Schult. & Schult.f.; Loranthus guianensis Klotzsch; Passovia guianensis (Klotzsch) Tiegh.

= Psittacanthus cordatus =

Species of parasitic flowering plant

Psittacanthus cordatus is a species of Neotropical mistletoe in the family Loranthaceae, which is native to Bolivia and Brazil.

== Description ==
Psittacanthus cordatus initially grows upward and then becomes pendulous, with the shape of its stems being circular. The leaves are opposite, with the base of the leaf being obtuse to cordate, and the apex, acute. The position of the racemose inflorescence is both axillary and terminal. The flowers form groups of three (triads) on a stem, and are red to yellow. The style is straight.

== Habitat ==
It is found in the Amazon rainforest, the Central Brazilian Savanna, Atlantic Rainforest and Pantanal, in the Caatinga, Carrasco Vegetation, Cerrado ecoregion, Riverine Forest and/or Gallery Forest, Terra Firme Forest, flooded forest (Várzea), and Tropical Rain Forest.

== Taxonomy ==
Psittacanthus cordatus was first described by Hoffmansegg in 1829 as Loranthus cordatus, and in 1834, Don assigned it to the new genus Psittacanthus. There is some confusion with respect to the accepted name: Plants of the World online and Flora do Brasil give the accepted name as Psittacanthus cordatus (Hoffmans.) G.Don, while GBIF gives the accepted name as Psittacanthus cordatus Blume.

== Etymology ==
Psittacanthus comes from the Greek psittakos (parrot), and the Greek anthos (flower), chosen according to Don, possibly because of the bright colours. Cordatus is from the Latin cordate(heart-shaped).
