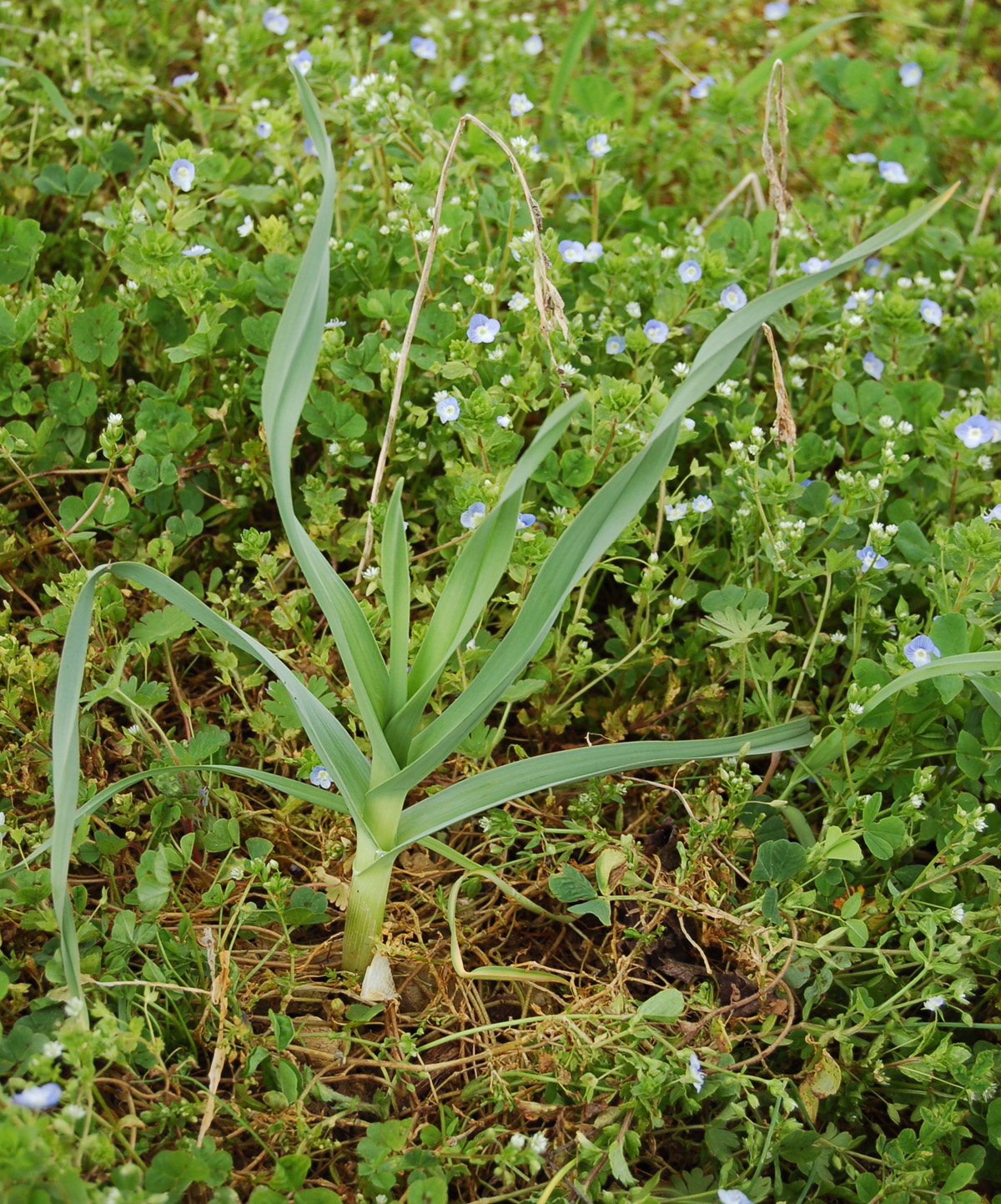

Scientific classification
- Kingdom: Plantae
- Clade: Tracheophytes
- Clade: Angiosperms
- Clade: Monocots
- Order: Asparagales
- Family: Amaryllidaceae
- Subfamily: Allioideae
- Genus: Allium
- Subgenus: A. subg. Allium
- Species: A. polyanthum

Binomial name
- Allium polyanthum Schult. & Schult. f.

Synonyms
- Synonymy: Allium ampeloprasum subsp. polyanthum (Schult. & Schult.f.) O.Bolòs & al.; Allium multiflorum DC.; Allium porrum subsp. polyanthum (Schult. & Schult.f.) Jauzein & J.-M.Tison; Allium rotundum var. multiflorum Nyman; Allium rotundum var. polyanthum (Schult. & Schult.f.) Asch. & Graebn.

= Allium polyanthum =

Many-flowered garlic

Species of flowering plant

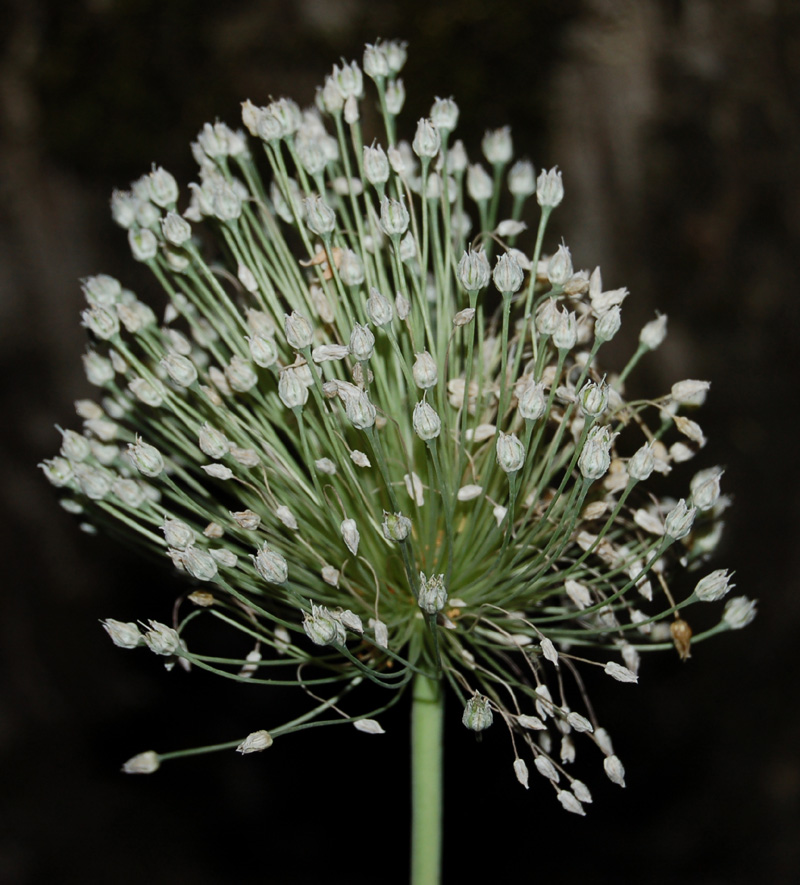

Allium polyanthum, called the many-flowered garlic, is a Mediterranean species of wild onion native to Spain, France, Italy, Morocco, and Tunisia. It is widely cultivated for its edible and potently aromatic bulbs and foliage.

Allium polyanthum produces an egg-shaped bulb, often with small bulblets around the base. Scape can be up to 80 cm tall. Leaves are flat and broadly linear, tapering at the tip. Flowers are numerous and small, white or pink.
