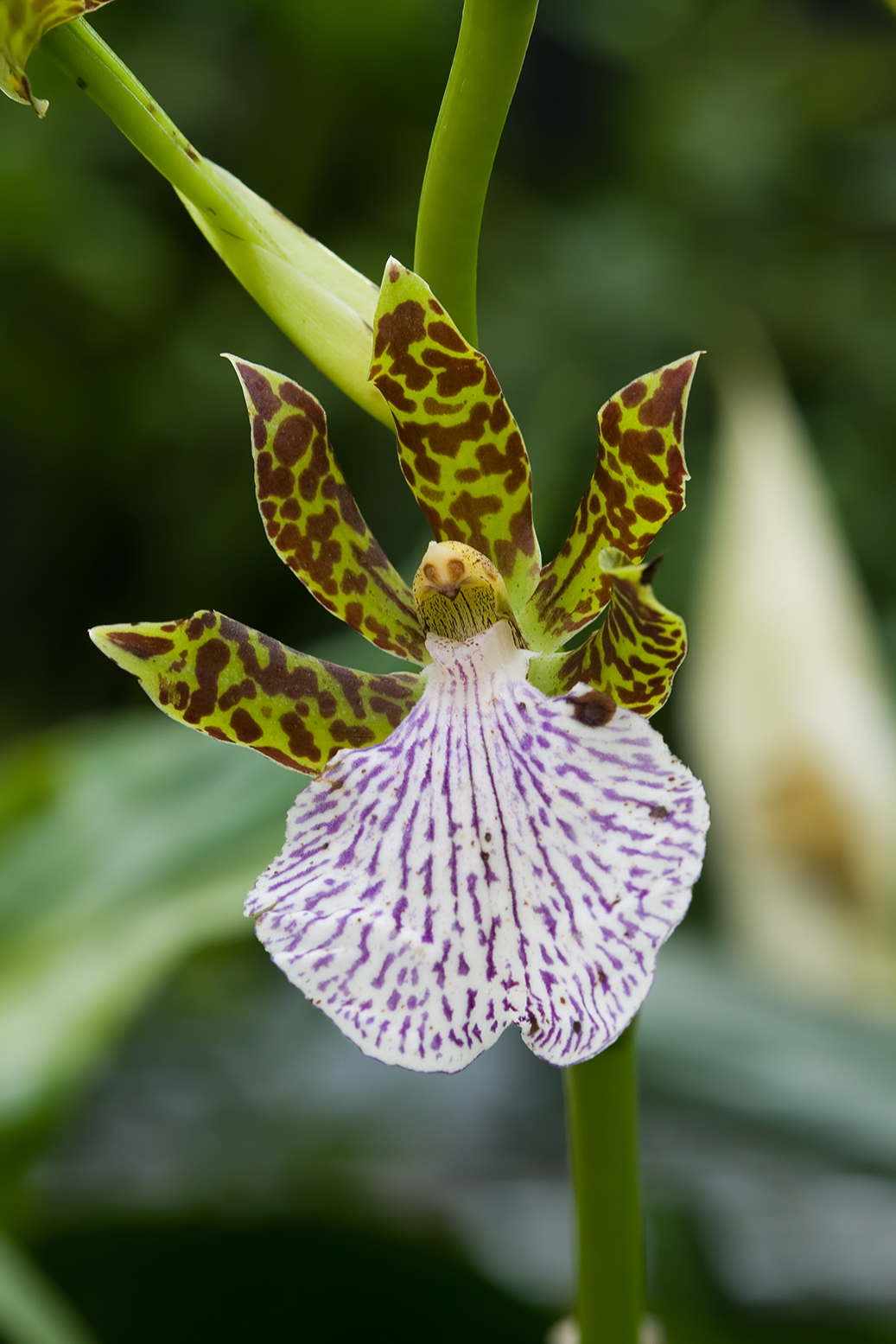
- Zygopetalum crinitum flower

Scientific classification
- Kingdom: Plantae
- Clade: Tracheophytes
- Clade: Angiosperms
- Clade: Monocots
- Order: Asparagales
- Family: Orchidaceae
- Subfamily: Epidendroideae
- Genus: Zygopetalum
- Species: Z. crinitum

Binomial name
- Zygopetalum crinitum Lodd.

Synonyms
- Zygopetalum stenochilum Lodd.; Zygopetalum pubescens Hoffmanns.; Zygopetalum microtus Hoffmanns. ex Rchb.f.; Zygopetalum crepeauxii Carrière

= Zygopetalum crinitum =

Species of orchid

Zygopetalum crinitum is a species of orchid.

It is endemic to the Atlantic Forest ecoregion in southern and southeastern Brazil.

It grows at elevations of 600 to 1200 meters.
