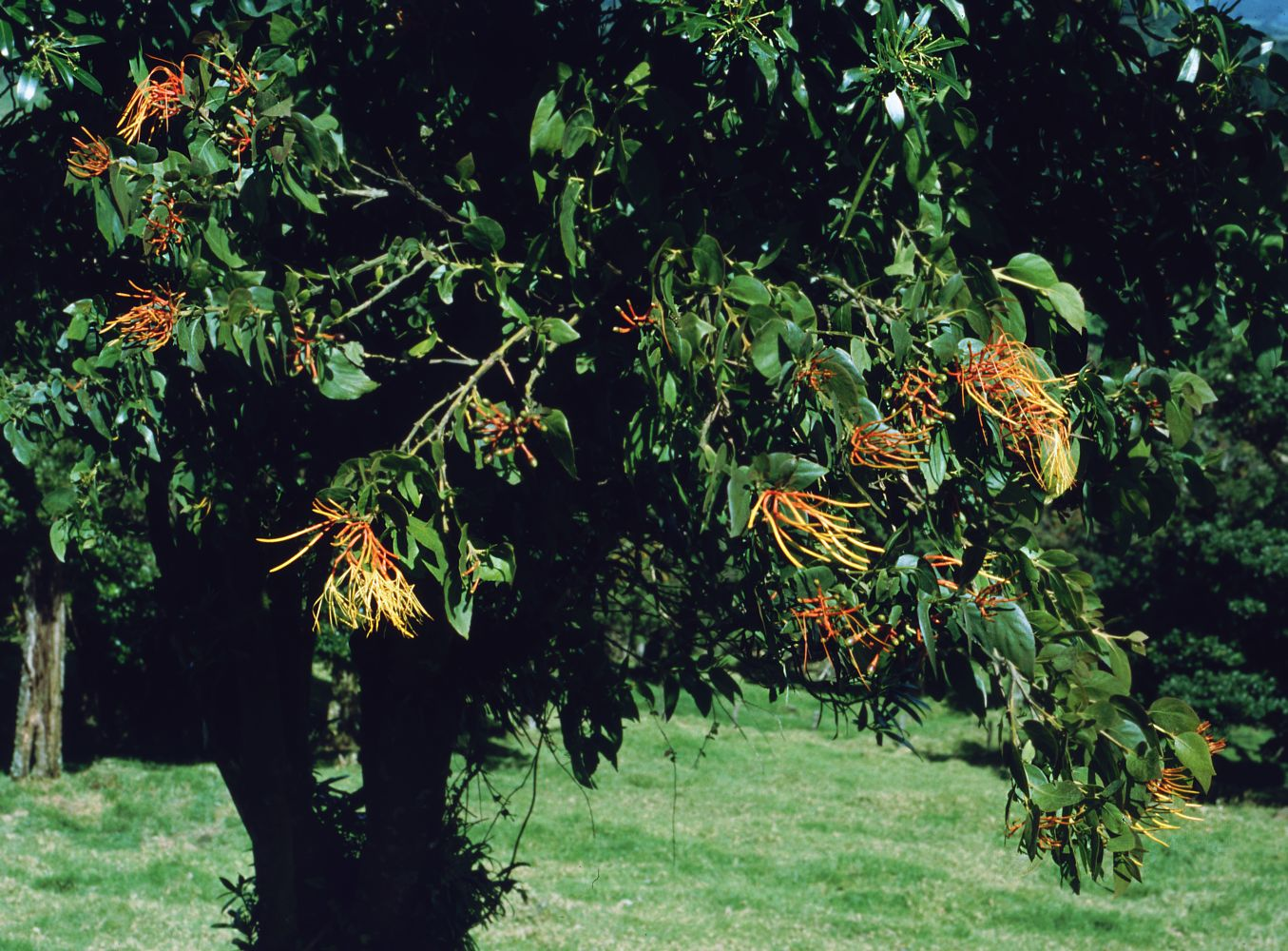
- Psittacanthus schiedeanus

Scientific classification
- Kingdom: Plantae
- Clade: Embryophytes
- Clade: Tracheophytes
- Clade: Spermatophytes
- Clade: Angiosperms
- Clade: Eudicots
- Order: Santalales
- Family: Loranthaceae
- Genus: Psittacanthus
- Species: P. schiedeanus

Binomial name
- Psittacanthus schiedeanus (Schltdl. & Cham.) G.Don

Synonyms
- Loranthus schiedeanus Schltdl. & Cham.; Chatinia schiedeana (Schltdl. & Cham.) Tiegh.

= Psittacanthus schiedeanus =

Species of parasitic flowering plant

Psittacanthus schiedeanus is a species of Neotropical mistletoe in the family Loranthaceae, which is native to Panama, Costa Rica, Honduras and Mexico.

== Description ==
Psittacanthus schiedeanus is a hemiparasite growing to 1–2 metres (3–7 ft) with quadrangular stems which are flattened at the nodes. The haustorium is large. The bluish-green leaves are asymmetric and about 20 centimetres (8 in) long and 8 centimetres (3 in) wide, with stout petioles and pinnate venation. The inflorescence is terminal. The fruit is a berry. Its most remarkable feature is its seeds, which have up to twelve cotyledons (the most of any dicot, almost all of which have two; the source of the class name).

== Hosts ==
The most common hosts are oaks (Quercus species) and other hardwoods. Other hosts are the conifers Pinus leiophylla, P. montezumae, P. teocote and P. oocarpa. This species causes significant damage to pine forests used for harvesting wood. However, despite being a damaging parasite of conifers, it is important for medicine and wildlife.

== Ecology ==
Birds are important in the plant's life-cycle. They pollinate it while feeding on the nectar, and when they feed on the fruit they disperse the seeds.

== Taxonomy ==
Psittacanthus schiedeanus was first described by Adelbert von Chamisso and Diederich Franz Leonhard von Schlechtendal 1830 as Loranthus schiedeanus, and in 1834, George Don assigned it to the genus Psittacanthus.

== Etymology ==
Psittacanthus comes from the Greek psittakos (parrot), and the Greek anthos (flower), possibly chosen, according to Don, because of the bright colours. The epithet schiedeanus honours the collector Christian Julius Wilhelm Schiede, botanist and plant collector in Mexico.
