= Psittacanthus angustifolius =

Scientific classification
- Kingdom: Plantae
- Clade: Tracheophytes
- Clade: Angiosperms
- Clade: Eudicots
- Order: Santalales
- Family: Loranthaceae
- Genus: Psittacanthus
- Species: P. angustifolius

Binomial name
- Psittacanthus angustifolius Kuijt

Species of hemiparasitic flowering plant

Psittacanthus angustifolius is a species of hemiparasitic plant in the family Loranthaceae found in Guatemala, Honduras and Mexico.

== Destruction ==
In August 2000, it was found on Psidium guineense 5 kilometres (3.1 mi) north of Yamaranguila, Department Intibuca of Honduras. In November of the same year, it was found on Pinus tecunumanii which was growing 4 kilometres (2.5 mi) north of Opatoro, Department La Paz. In Mexico, the species was found on Pinus tecunumanii and Pinus oocarpa which were growing 4-km south of Jitotol, Chiapas.
