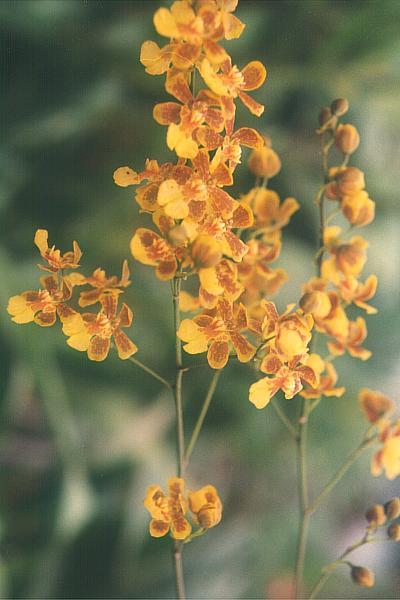

Scientific classification
- Kingdom: Plantae
- Clade: Tracheophytes
- Clade: Angiosperms
- Clade: Monocots
- Order: Asparagales
- Family: Orchidaceae
- Subfamily: Epidendroideae
- Genus: Oncidium
- Species: O. auricula

Binomial name
- Oncidium auricula (Vell.) Pabst

Synonyms
- Oncidium harrisonianum Lindl.; Oncidium pallidum Lindl.; Oncidium pentaspilum Hoffmanns. ex Lindl.; Oncidium ramiferum Klotzsch; Oncidium acrobotryum Klotzsch; Oncidium pantherinum Hoffmanns. ex Lindl.

= Oncidium auricula =

Species of orchid

Oncidium auricula is a species of orchid endemic to southeastern Brazil.
