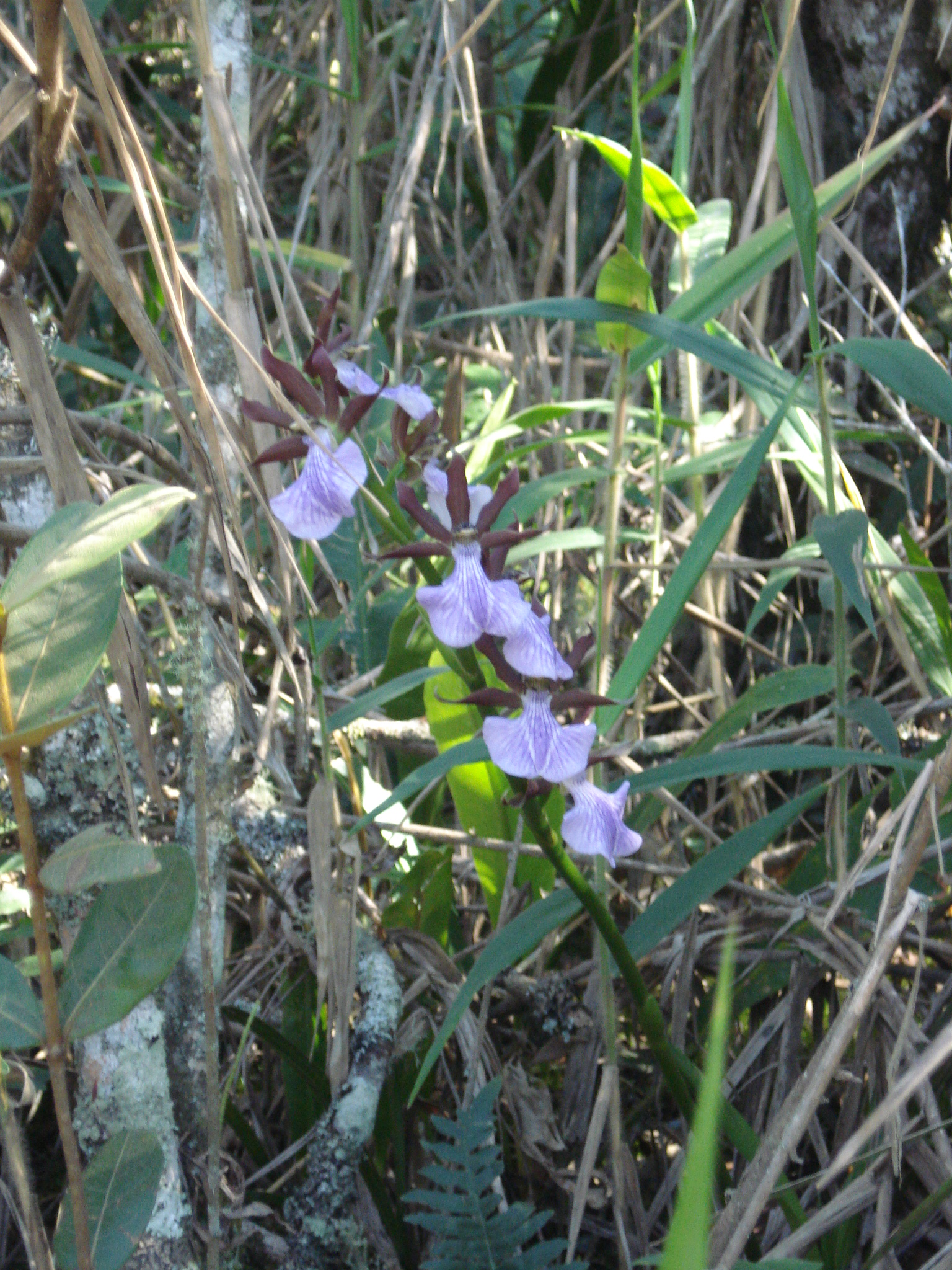

Scientific classification
- Kingdom: Plantae
- Clade: Tracheophytes
- Clade: Angiosperms
- Clade: Monocots
- Order: Asparagales
- Family: Orchidaceae
- Subfamily: Epidendroideae
- Genus: Zygopetalum
- Species: Z. maculatum
- Subspecies: Z. m. subsp. triste

Trinomial name
- Zygopetalum maculatum subsp. triste (Barb.Rodr.) Meneguzzo

Synonyms
- Zygopetalum triste Barb.Rodr.; Zygopetalum brachypetalum var. stenopetalum Regel

= Zygopetalum maculatum subsp. triste =

Species of perennial herb

Zygopetalum maculatum subsp. triste is a subspecies of perennial herb in the Orchidaceae family. In English, it goes by the common name The Dark Purple Zygopetalum.

The subspecies can be found in south eastern Brazil in the state of Minas Gerais.
