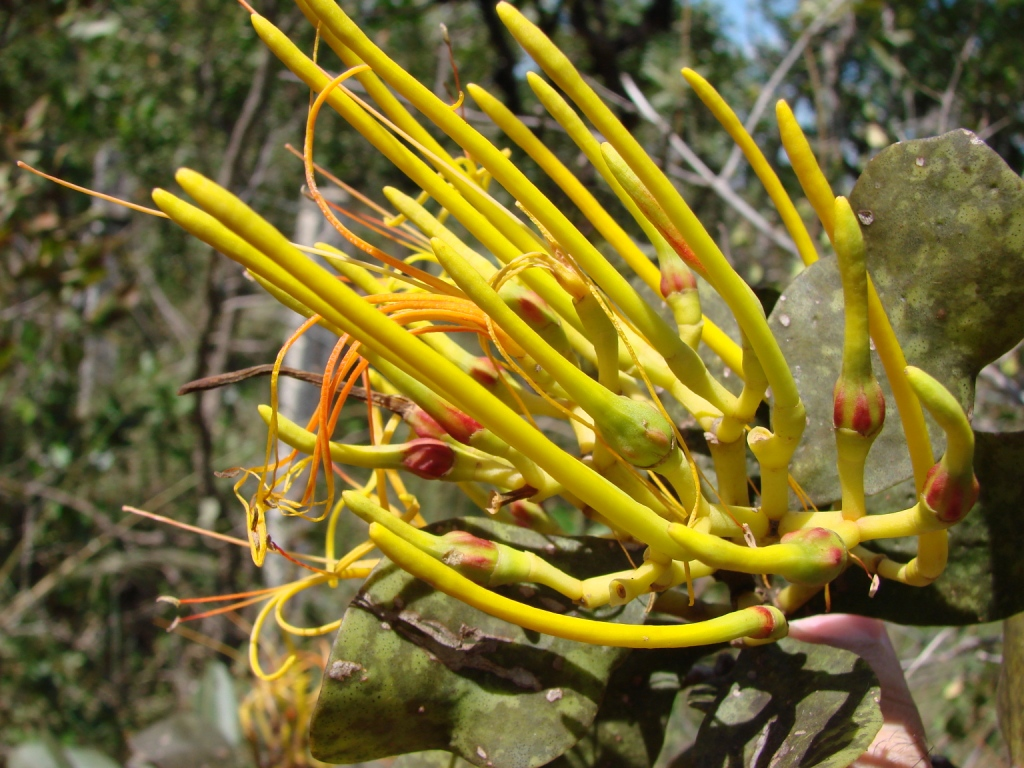
- Psittacanthus robustus
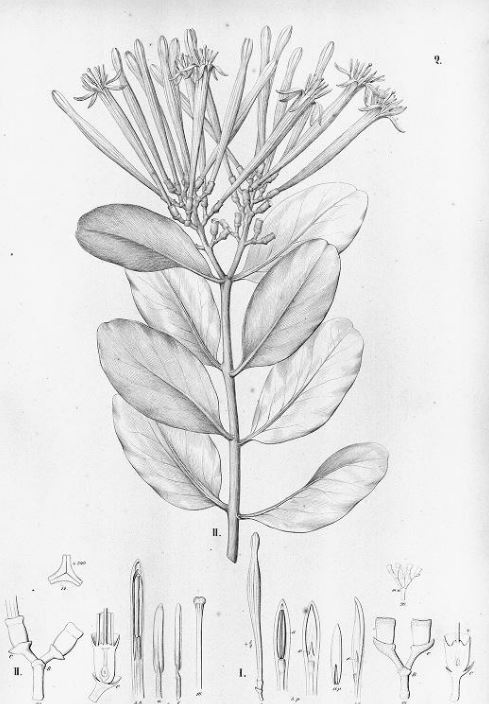

Scientific classification
- Kingdom: Plantae
- Clade: Tracheophytes
- Clade: Angiosperms
- Clade: Eudicots
- Order: Santalales
- Family: Loranthaceae
- Genus: Psittacanthus
- Species: P. robustus

Binomial name
- Psittacanthus robustus Mart.
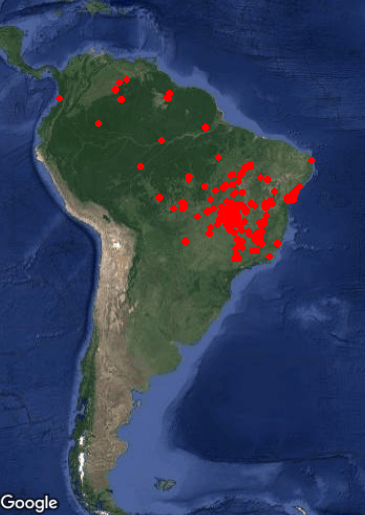
- collections data from GBIF

Synonyms
- Loranthus robustus Mart.; Psittacanthus decipiens Eichler; Psittacanthus formosus (Cham. & Schltdl.) G.Don; Psittacanthus intermedius Rizzini; Psittacanthus speciosus (Pohl ex DC.) G. Don; Psittacanthus stenanthus Rizzini

= Psittacanthus robustus =

Species of mistletoe

Psittacanthus robustus is a species of Neotropical mistletoe in the family Loranthaceae, which is found in Brazil, Colombia, Guyana, and Venezuela.

== Description ==
Initially, branches are erect, but adult branches are pendulous. Branch cross-sections are square. Leaves are petiolate and obtuse at both base and apex. Inflorescences are both terminal and axillary, consisting of umbels of yellow to orange triads (flowers in groups of three). The fruit is light green colored when immature but when ripe the colour changes to black, and looks somewhat like an olive. Its seeds have 3 cotyledons and sticky substance inside.

== Taxonomy ==
P. robustus was first described by Martius in 1829 as Loranthus robustus, and in 1830, he assigned it to a new genus Psittacanthus.

== Distribution ==
It has been found in the Northern Amazon, in Brazil North, Brazil Northeast, Brazil Southeast, Brazil West-Central, Colombia, Guyana, and Venezuela, in Amazonian rainforests, Caatinga, the Central Brazilian Savanna, and the Atlantic Rainforest.

== Ecology ==
Three species of birds have been found eating and excreting the seeds. The most common isTersina viridis viridis (swallow tanager), but also the cinnamon-tanager, Schystoclamys ruficapillus ruficapillus, and the sayaca-tanager, Thraupis sayaca sayaca.

It has been found on thirteen hosts, from the genera Vochysiaceae and Melastomaceae.
