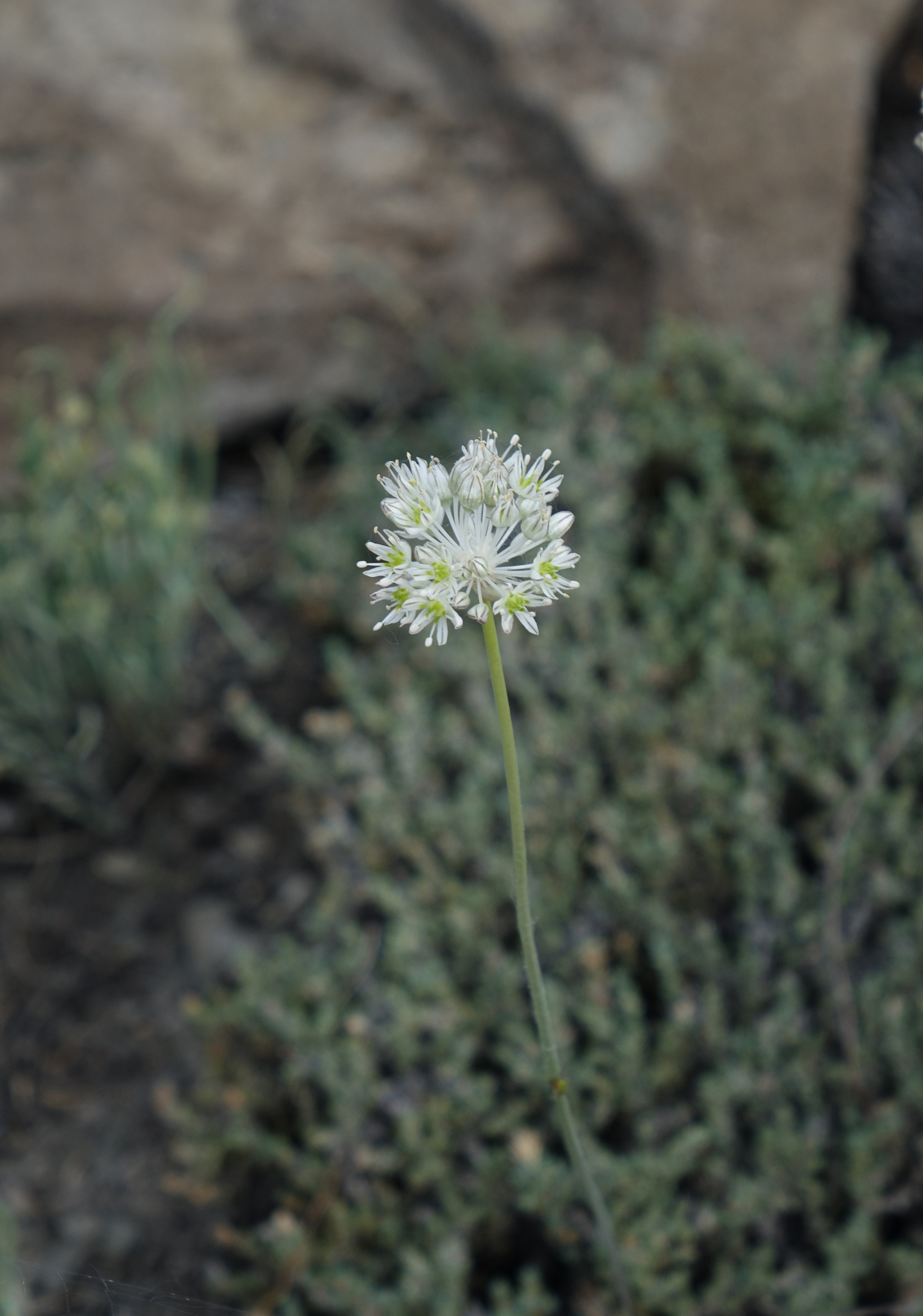
- found in Kazakhstan

Scientific classification
- Kingdom: Plantae
- Clade: Tracheophytes
- Clade: Angiosperms
- Clade: Monocots
- Order: Asparagales
- Family: Amaryllidaceae
- Subfamily: Allioideae
- Genus: Allium
- Subgenus: A. subg. Allium
- Species: A. delicatulum

Binomial name
- Allium delicatulum Siev. ex Schult. f.

Synonyms
- Allium dolonkarense Regel; Allium pusillum Willd.; Allium stenophyllum Regel ex Herder; Allium viridulum Kar. & Kir.; Allium willdenowii Kunth

= Allium delicatulum =

迷人薤 mi ren xie

Species of flowering plant

Allium delicatulum is a Eurasian species of onion native to European Russia, Western Siberia, Xinjiang, and Kazakhstan. It grows in open grasslands and deserts.

Allium delicatulum produces round to egg-shaped bulbs up to 15 mm across. Scapes are up to 25 cm tall, round in cross-section. Leaves are round and hollow, shorter than the scapes. Flowers have white or pink tepals with dark red midveins.
