= Psittacanthus brasiliensis =

Scientific classification
- Kingdom: Plantae
- Clade: Tracheophytes
- Clade: Angiosperms
- Clade: Eudicots
- Order: Santalales
- Family: Loranthaceae
- Genus: Psittacanthus
- Species: P. brasiliensis

Binomial name
- Psittacanthus brasiliensis (Desr.) G.Don

Synonyms
- Loranthus brasiliensis Desr.; Etubila brasiliensis (Desr.) Raf.

Species of parasitic flowering plant

Psittacanthus brasiliensis is a species of Neotropical mistletoe in the family Loranthaceae, which is endemic to Brazil.

== Description ==
Psittacanthus brasiliensis has pendulous branches, which are circular in cross-section. The leaves are opposite and petiolate, with the leaf base being acute and the apex obtuse. The position of the inflorescence is terminal and forms an umbel of triads on peduncles. Their colour is red and they have a straight style.

== Distribution ==
It occurs in the southeast of Brazil (Minas Gerais, Rio de Janeiro, São Paulo).

== Habitat ==
It grows in Atlantic forest and rainforest.

== Taxonomy ==
Psittacanthus brasiliensis was first described by Desrousseaux in 1792 as Loranthus brasiliensis, and in 1834, Don assigned it to the new genus Psittacanthus.

== Etymology ==
Psittacanthos comes from the Greek psittakos (parrot), and the Greek anthos (flower), possibly chosen, according to Don, because of the bright colours. The specific epithet, brasiliensis, is the Latin for of Brazil (genitive singular case).
