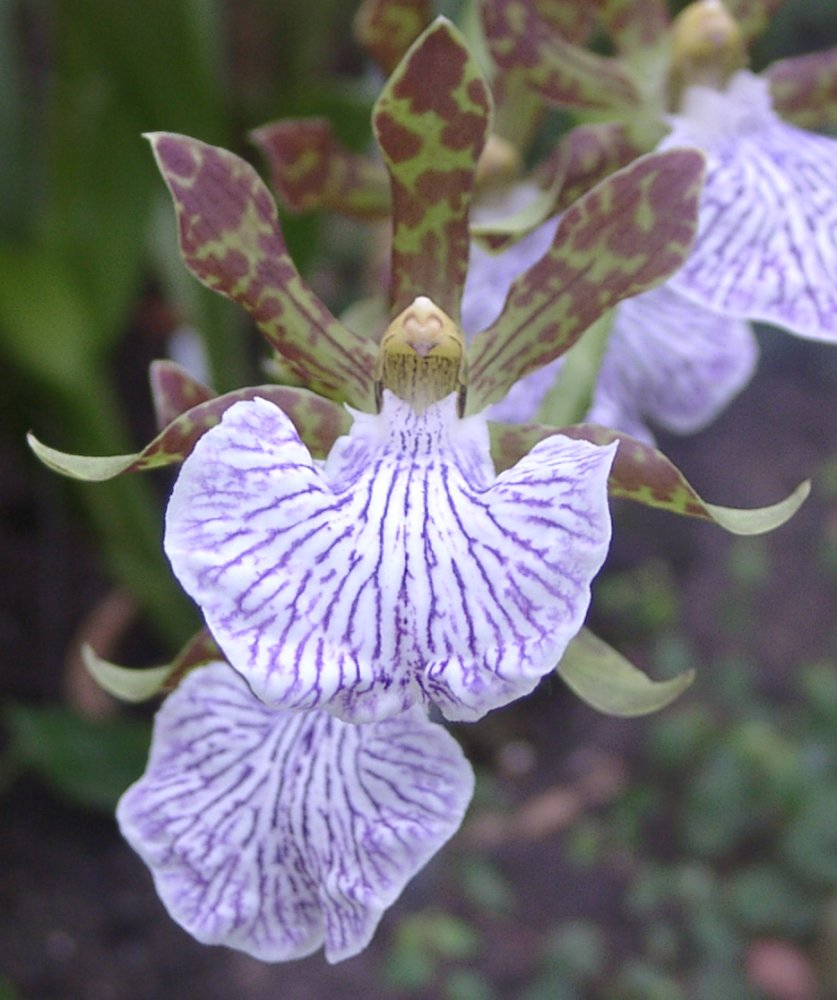
- Zygopetalum maculatum flower

Scientific classification
- Kingdom: Plantae
- Clade: Tracheophytes
- Clade: Angiosperms
- Clade: Monocots
- Order: Asparagales
- Family: Orchidaceae
- Subfamily: Epidendroideae
- Genus: Zygopetalum
- Species: Z. maculatum

Binomial name
- Zygopetalum maculatum (Kunth) Garay

Subspecies
- Zygopetalum maculatum subsp. maculatum; Zygopetalum maculatum subsp. triste (Barb.Rodr.) Meneguzzo

Synonyms
- Broughtonia maculata (Kunth) Spreng.; Dendrobium maculatum Kunth; Maxillaria maculata (Kunth) Lindl.

= Zygopetalum maculatum =

Species of orchid

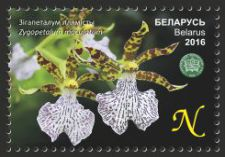
Stamp of Belarus

Zygopetalum maculatum is a species of orchid native to Peru, Bolivia and Brazil. The plants are mainly situated in flat, very wet, moss-covered, semi-boggy areas at elevations of 1,100 to 2,500 m (3,600 to 8,200 ft).

== Taxonomy ==
Two subspecies are recognised:

- Zygopetalum maculatum subsp. maculatum
- Zygopetalum maculatum subsp. triste (Barb.Rodr.) Meneguzzo

== Description ==
Zygopetalum maculatum has a 40 cm (16 in) long inflorescence with eight to twelve fragrant flowers. The flowers are 4–8 cm (1.6–3.1 in) wide, and are green with red-brown markings with a white lip marked with violet.

Successfully pollinated flowers close slightly to indicate pollination. Pollinated flowers remain healthy and colorful for up to three months, but unpollinated flowers wilt after one month.
