= Rousseauxia =

Scientific classification
- Kingdom: Plantae
- Clade: Tracheophytes
- Clade: Angiosperms
- Clade: Eudicots
- Clade: Rosids
- Order: Myrtales
- Family: Melastomataceae
- Genus: Rousseauxia; DC.

Genus of flowering plant

Rousseauxia is a genus of flowering plants belonging to the family Melastomataceae.

It is native to Madagascar.

The genus name of Rousseauxia is in honour of Louis Auguste Joseph Desrousseaux (1753–1838), a French botanist and pteridologist. It was first described and published in Prodr. Vol.3 on page 152 in 1828.

== Known species ==
According to Kew:

- Rousseauxia andringitrensis (H.Perrier) Jacq.-Fél.
- Rousseauxia aurata (H.Perrier) Jacq.-Fél.
- Rousseauxia chrysophylla DC.
- Rousseauxia cistoides Jacq.-Fél.
- Rousseauxia dionychoides (Cogn.) Jacq.-Fél.
- Rousseauxia glauca Jacq.-Fél.
- Rousseauxia gracilis Jacq.-Fél.
- Rousseauxia humbertii (H.Perrier) Jacq.-Fél.
- Rousseauxia madagascariensis (Cogn.) Jacq.-Fél.
- Rousseauxia mandrarensis (H.Perrier) Jacq.-Fél.
- Rousseauxia marojejensis Jacq.-Fél.
- Rousseauxia minimifolia (Jum. & H.Perrier) Jacq.-Fél.
- Rousseauxia tamatavensis (H.Perrier) Jacq.-Fél.
