= Psittacanthus gigas =

Scientific classification
- Kingdom: Plantae
- Clade: Tracheophytes
- Clade: Angiosperms
- Clade: Eudicots
- Order: Santalales
- Family: Loranthaceae
- Genus: Psittacanthus
- Species: P. gigas

Binomial name
- Psittacanthus gigas Kuijt

Species of mistletoe

Psittacanthus gigas is a mistletoe (family Loranthaceae) native to Colombia. It was discovered in 1984 by Alwyn Gentry. It is most noteworthy for producing the largest leaves of any dicot shrub, with a blade or lamina up to 3.9 feet (120 cm) in length and 12 inches (30 cm) wide.
