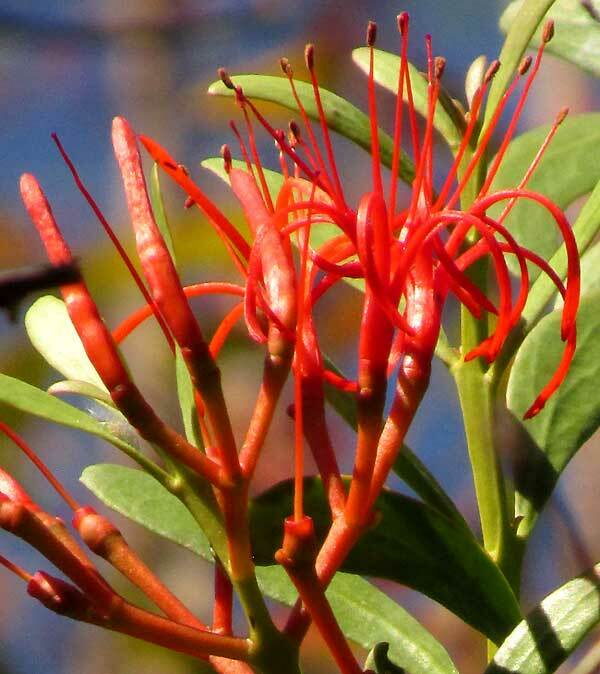
- Psittacanthus mayanus flowers

Scientific classification
- Kingdom: Plantae
- Clade: Tracheophytes
- Clade: Angiosperms
- Clade: Eudicots
- Order: Santalales
- Family: Loranthaceae
- Genus: Psittacanthus
- Species: P. mayanus

Binomial name
- Psittacanthus mayanus Standl. & Steyerm., 1944

= Psittacanthus mayanus =

Species of flowering plant

Psittacanthus mayanus, with no established English name, is a species of the genus Psittacanthus, whose members are known generally as mistletoes and parrot-flowers. It belongs to the family of the Showy Mistletoes, the Loranthaceae.

== Description ==
Psittacanthus mayanus is a hairless bush partially parasitic on trees. Stems on older plants are somewhat quadrangular in cross-section. Paired, thin leaves, broadest near their middles, are up to about 8 cm (3.1 in) long and 3 cm (1.2 in) wide. Blade tips are rounded, while blade bases narrow to very short petioles.

Inflorescences occur at branch tips, with flowers ultimately arranged in threes, plus sometimes smaller flower clusters arise nearby where leaf petioles attach to their stem. Flowers are bright red, though sometimes yellowish, with more or less same-sized petals 3 cm (1.2 in) long and spreading on mature flowers. Stamens consist of small, pollen-producing anthers atop slender, red filaments of two lengths about 15 mm (0.59 in) long. Mature fruits are ellipsoid, red and about 9 mm (0.35 in) long.

== Distribution ==
Psittacanthus mayanus occurs in southern Mexico's Yucatan Peninsula south into the states of Michoacán, Oaxaca and Chiapas, as well as in Belize, Guatemala, and probably also in Honduras and El Salvador.

== Habitat ==
Psittacanthus mayanus, like other Psittacanthus species, tend to parasitize the crown of trees. As partially parasitic, or "hemiparasitic", not only do they take water from their host trees, but also their ow leaves remain photosynthetic, manufacturing some of the plant's own nutrients.

In the Yucatan Peninsula Psittacanthus mayanus is known to parasitize the commonly occurring wild tamarind, Lysiloma latisiliquum, of the Bean Family. Images on this page show an individual atop a planted Crepe Myrtle, Lagerstroemia speciosa, of the family Lythraceae. In the 1944 formal description of Psittacanthus mayanus, the type specimen (Percy Gentle 116, British Honduras, now Belize) was on a Gumbo Limbo, Bursera simaruba, of the Burseraceae.

== Taxonomy ==
Within the family Loranthaceae, Psittacanthus mayanus is considered to belong to the subfamily Loranthoideae, the tribe Psittacantheae, and subtribe Psittacanthinae.

A 2019 study based on floral characters found that Psittacanthus mayanus is part of a clade along with P. acinarius, P. breedlovei, P. calycaulatus, P. rhynchanthus and P. schiedianus.

== Etymology ==
In the genus name Psittacanthus the Psitta is from the Ancient Greek ψιττακη, psittakē, meaning "parrot". The -acanthus is from the New Latin acanthus, which was a borrowing from the Greek akanthos, a thorny plant, the word akantha meaning "thorn". This history is associated with one of the common name of Psittacanthus species, "parrot-flowers".

The species name, mayanus, was not explained by the authors upon publication, but it clearly relates the taxon's distribution area coinciding with that of the Mayan people.

== Gallery ==
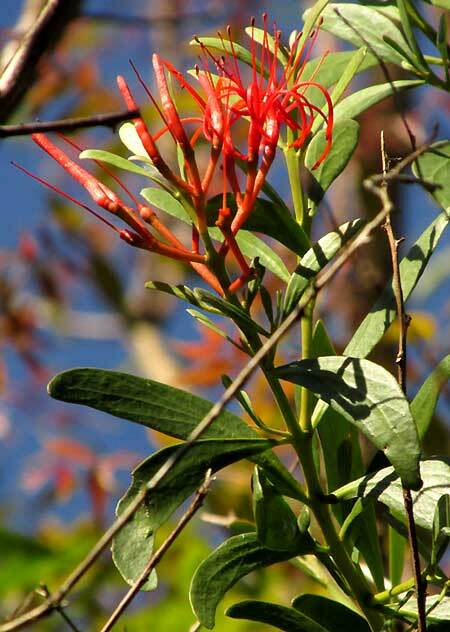
Psittacanthus mayanus flowering branch

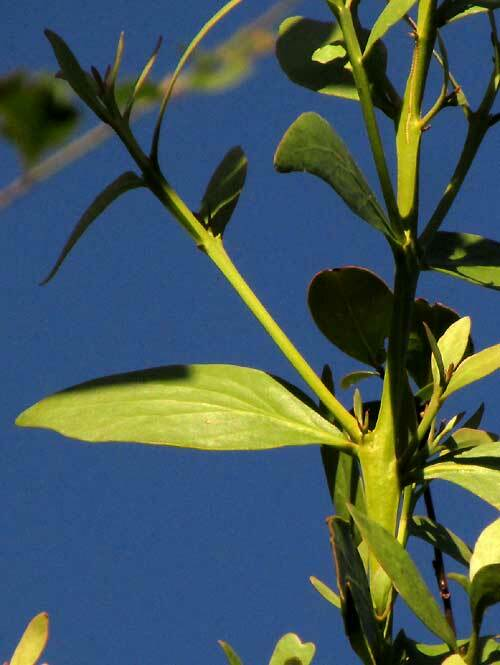
Psittacanthus mayanus leaves and quadrangular stems

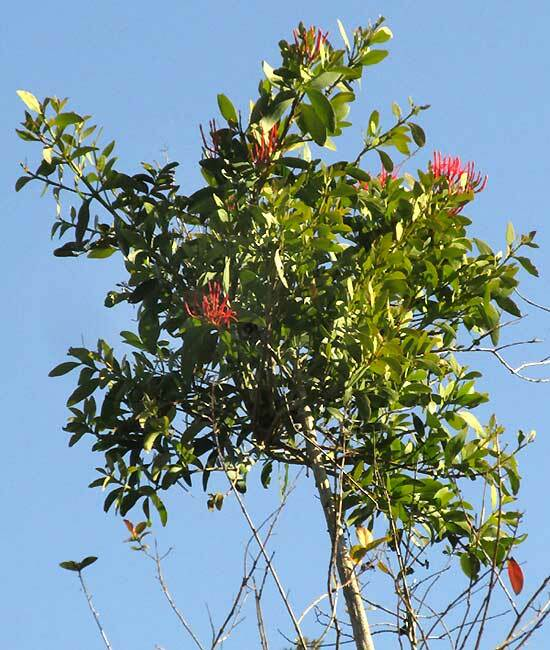
Psittacanthus mayanus parasitizing a Crepe Myrtle
