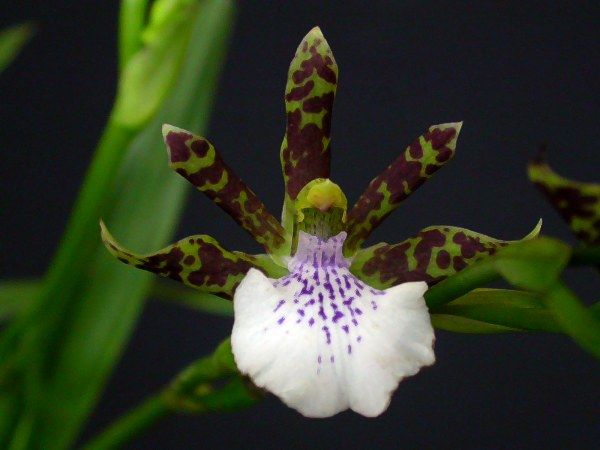
- Zygopetalum pedicellatum flower

Scientific classification
- Kingdom: Plantae
- Clade: Tracheophytes
- Clade: Angiosperms
- Clade: Monocots
- Order: Asparagales
- Family: Orchidaceae
- Subfamily: Epidendroideae
- Genus: Zygopetalum
- Species: Z. pedicellatum

Binomial name
- Zygopetalum pedicellatum (Sw.) Garay

Synonyms
- Cymbidium pedicellatum Sw. (basionym); Zygopetalum mosenianum Barb.Rodr.; Zygopetalum caulescens Rolfe

= Zygopetalum pedicellatum =

Mosen's zygopetalum

Species of orchid

Zygopetalum pedicellatum, commonly known as the Mosen's zygopetalum, is a species of orchid native to southeastern Brazil.

The name is considered a synonym of Zygopetalum mosenianum.
