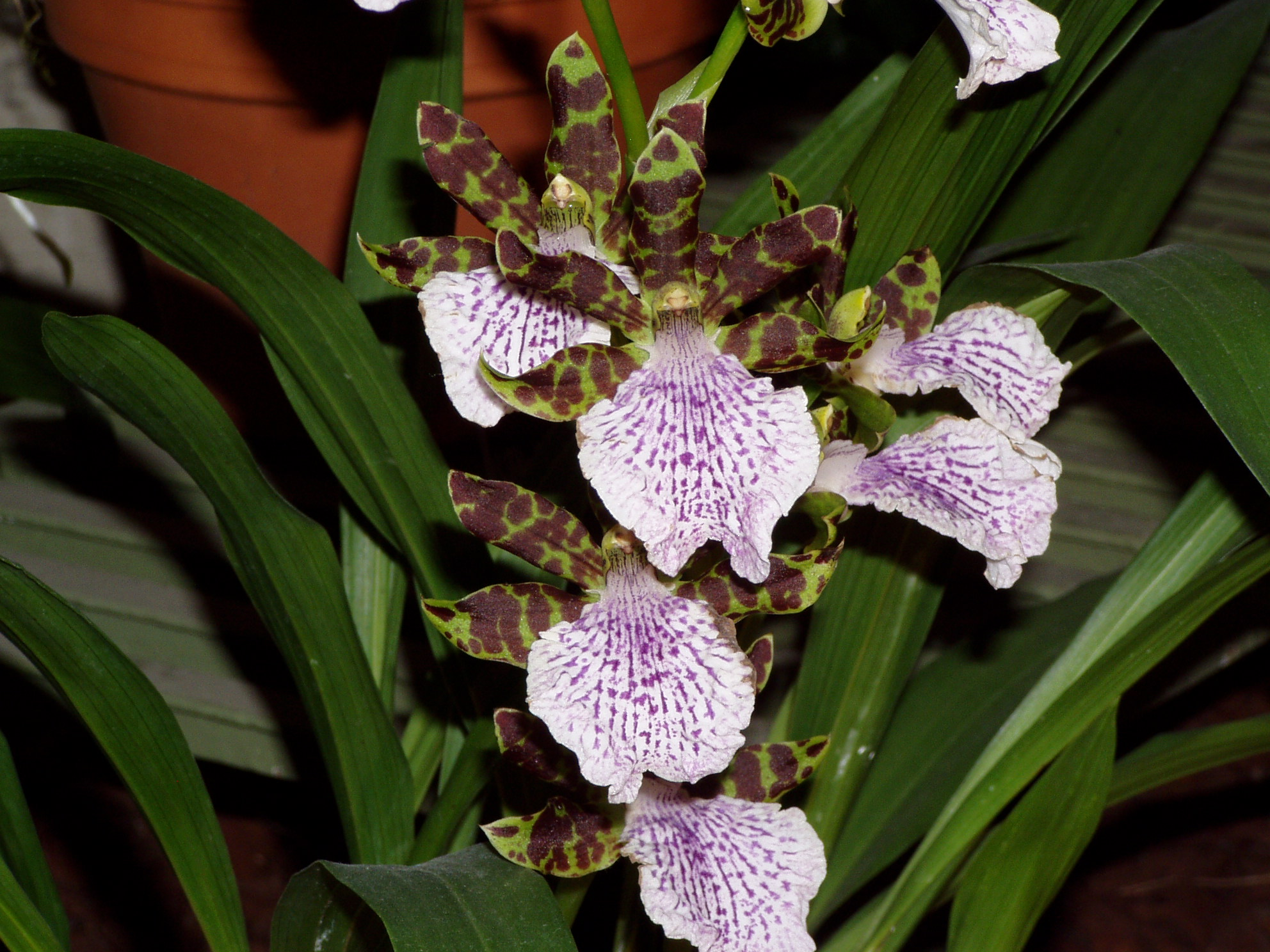
- Zygopetalum maculatum

Scientific classification
- Kingdom: Plantae
- Clade: Tracheophytes
- Clade: Angiosperms
- Clade: Monocots
- Order: Asparagales
- Family: Orchidaceae
- Subfamily: Epidendroideae
- Tribe: Cymbidieae
- Subtribe: Zygopetalinae
- Genus: Zygopetalum; Hook., 1833

Type species
- Zygopetalum mackayi (syn of Z. maculatum) Hook., 1833

Synonyms
- Zygopetalon Rchb., spelling variation

= Zygopetalum =

Genus of orchids

Zygopetalum (abbreviated Z.) is a genus of the orchid family (Orchidaceae). This genus consists of six currently recognized species.

== Name ==
This orchid's generic name, derived from the Greek word zugón, means "yoke". It refers to the yoke-like growth at the base of the lip.

The genus name has Z. as a unique abbreviation among orchid genera.

== Distribution ==
They occur in humid forests at low- to mid-elevation regions of South America, with most species in Brazil.

== Description ==
Most species are epiphytes, but some are terrestrials with glossy, strap-like, plicate leaves, which are apical, oblong or elliptic-lanceolate, acute or acuminate. These orchids have a robust growth form. Their ovoid-conical pseudobulbs are deciduous.

They produce an erect, 60-centimeter-long, few-flowered to several-flowered, racemose inflorescence that grows laterally and is longer than the leaves. Their prominent bracts equal the length of the ovary. They are known for their fragrant, waxy, and long-lived flowers with multiple blooms in shades of green, purple, burgundy, and raspberry with several patterns.

== Cultivation ==
They are known for their ease of culture and are much in demand as excellent cut flowers.

== Species ==
Species accepted as of September 2026:

Image	Name	Distribution	Elevation (m)
	Zygopetalum crinitum G.Lodd.	Brazil (from Santa Catarina to Espirito Santo)	600–1,200 metres (2,000–3,900 ft)
	Zygopetalum maculatum (Kunth) Garay	Peru, Bolivia, Brazil	2,100 metres (6,900 ft)
	Zygopetalum maxillare G.Lodd.	Brazil, Paraguay, Argentina	600–1,000 metres (2,000–3,300 ft)
	Zygopetalum microphytum Barb.Rodr.	Brazil (Minas Gerais, São Paulo)	
	Zygopetalum mosenianum Barb.Rodr.	southeastern Brazil	
	Zygopetalum sellowii Rchb.f. in W.G.Walpers	Brazil	
