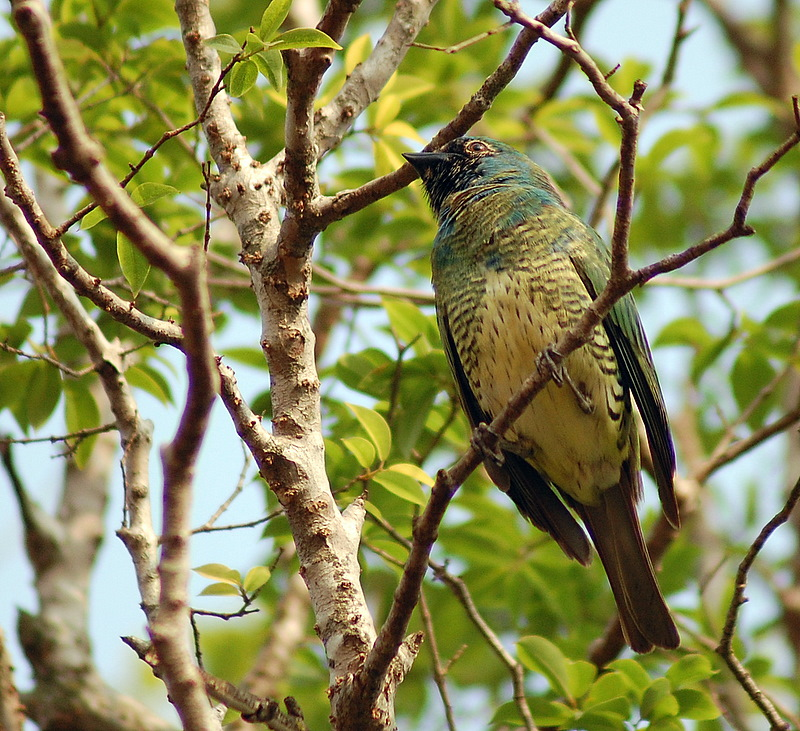
- Female
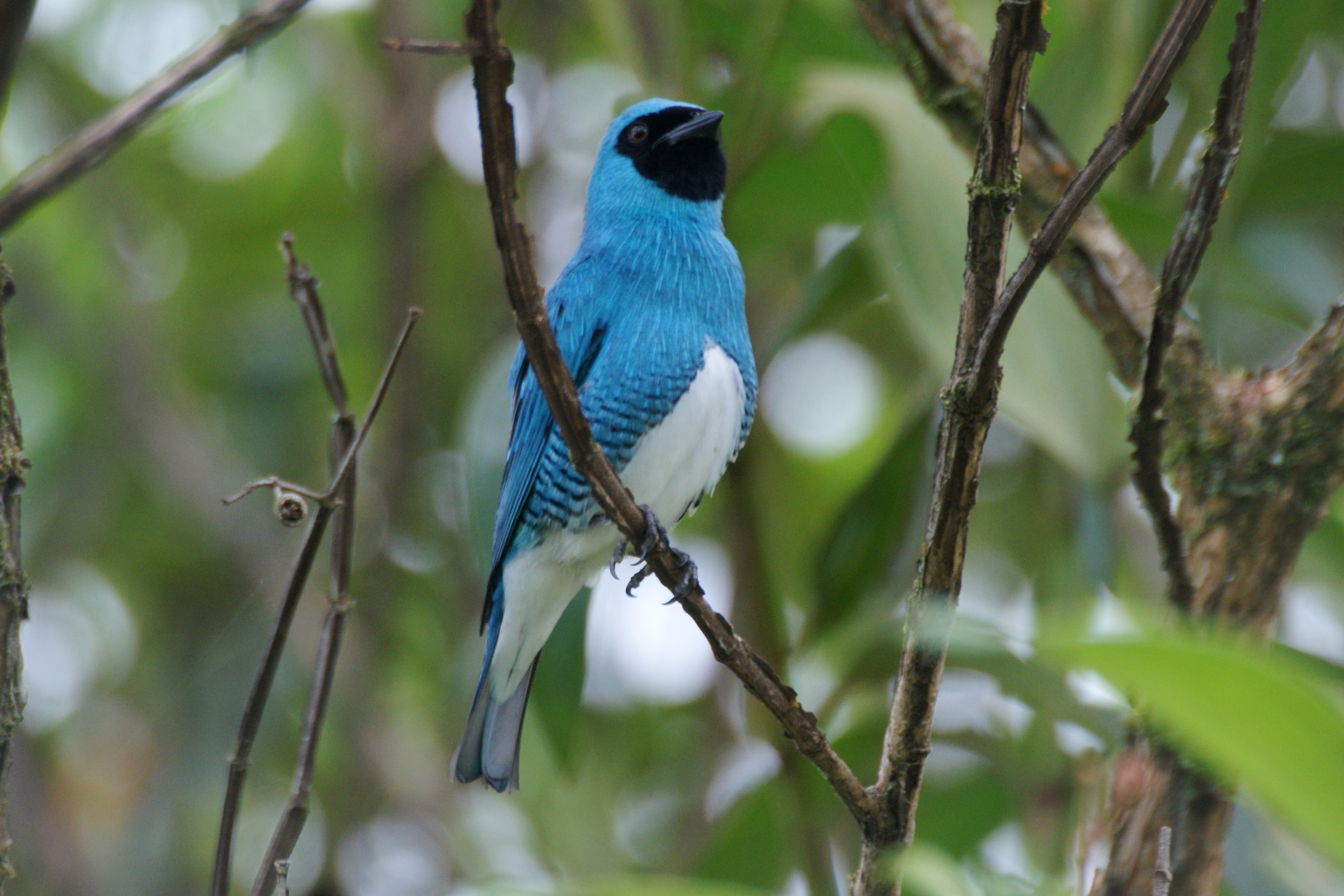
- Male in Paraná, Brazil

Conservation status
- Least Concern (IUCN 3.1)

Scientific classification
- Kingdom: Animalia
- Phylum: Chordata
- Class: Aves
- Order: Passeriformes
- Family: Thraupidae
- Genus: Tersina; Vieillot, 1819
- Species: T. viridis

Binomial name
- Tersina viridis (Illiger, 1811)

= Swallow tanager =

Species of bird

The swallow tanager (Tersina viridis) is a species of Neotropic bird in the family Thraupidae, the tanagers and allies. It occurs regularly in Panama, on Trinidad, and in every mainland South American country except Chile and Uruguay. It has occurred as a vagrant in those two countries and on Tobago and Bonaire and there are unconfirmed reports from Curaçao.

== Taxonomy and systematics ==
The swallow tanager was formally described in 1811 by the German zoologist Johann Karl Wilhelm Illiger with the binomial Hirundo viridis, mistakenly classifying it as a swallow. The type locality is eastern Brazil. The species is now the only member of the genus Tersina that was introduced in 1819 by the French ornithologist Louis Pierre Vieillot. The genus name is from the French Tersine, an unidentified bird described by Georges-Louis Leclerc, Comte de Buffon. The specific epithet viridis is the Latin for "green". Some mid-twentieth century authors placed the genus in its own family, Tersinidae. A molecular phylogenetic study of the tanager family published in 2014 found that the swallow tanager is a Thraupidae tanager and is sister to the honeycreepers in the genus Cyanerpes.

The swallow tanager has these three subspecies:

- T. v. grisescens Griscom, 1929
- T. v. occidentalis (Sclater, PL, 1855)
- T. v. viridis (Illiger, 1811)

== Description ==
The swallow tanager is 14 to 15 centimetres (5.5 to 5.9 in) long and weighs 26 to 35 g (0.92 to 1.2 oz). It has a broad flat bill, a short tail, and short legs. The species is strongly sexually dimorphic. Adult males of the nominate subspecies T. v. viridis have a mostly bright turquoise-blue head with a triangular black "mask" from the base of the forehead to behind the eye and including the throat. Their upperparts are bright turquoise-blue. Their wings' primary coverts are black with thin turquoise-blue edges, their primaries are turquoise-blue with black tips, their secondaries all turquoise-blue, and their tertials black with turquoise edges. Their tail feathers are black with turquoise edges and grayish undersides. The center of their lower breast, their belly, and their undertail coverts are white. The rest of their underparts are turquoise-blue with coarse black barring on the flanks. Adult females are mostly bright grass-green. Their mask is dingy gray with dusky brown mottling. Their wing coverts are green and their flight feathers black with varying widths of green edging. The center of their lower breast, their belly, and their undertail coverts are pale yellow and their sides and flanks are darker yellow with coarse green barring. Subspecies T. v. occidentalis is smaller than the nominate but has essentially the same plumage. Males of T. v. grisescens are like the nominate; females are grayish green instead of grass-green. Both sexes of all subspecies have a reddish brown iris, a black bill, and dusky horn-gray legs and feet.

== Distribution and habitat ==
Subspecies T. v. occidentalis of the swallow tanager is the most northerly of the three and has the widest range. It is found in eastern Panama's Darién Province, in western, central, and most of southeastern Colombia, on both flanks of the Venezuelan Andes, in the Venezuelan Coastal Ranges, and across southern Venezuela and east through the Guianas, on Trinidad, in western Ecuador south to northern Loja Province, through eastern Ecuador and eastern Peru into northwestern and eastern Bolivia, and across much of western and northern Brazil. In contrast, subspecies T. v. grisescens is found only in the isolated Sierra Nevada de Santa Marta in northern Colombia. The nominate subspecies is found from Rio Grande do Norte in northeastern Brazil south near the coast and then from a line roughly from Bahia to southern Mato Grosso south to northern Rio Grande do Sul. Its range extends west into northeastern Bolivia, about half of Paraguay, and northeastern Argentina's Misiones Province. The species has also occurred as a vagrant in Chile and Uruguay, on Tobago, and on Bonaire. There are unconfirmed reports from Curaçao.

The swallow tanager inhabits a variety of dry to humid landscapes, most of which are somewhat open. They include the edges of extensive forest, mature secondary woodlands, shade coffee plantations, and clearings and cleared areas with scattered trees. It also occurs in the canopy of extensive forest and in gallery forest. In elevation it reaches 1,800 m (5,900 ft) in Colombia, 1,400 m (4,600 ft) in Ecuador, and 1,500 m (4,900 ft) in Peru. In the Venezuelan Andes it ranges between 2,300 and 2,900 m (7,500 and 9,500 ft) and in the Coastal Ranges between 1,800 and 2,200 m (5,900 and 7,200 ft). In Brazil it ranges mostly from sea level to 1,500 m (4,900 ft) but occasionally higher.

== Behavior ==
=== Movement ===
The swallow tanager has complicated movements, many of which are poorly understood. In the Amazon Basin it is generally a resident though it makes some nomadic movements outside the breeding season. In Venezuela it is described as a "resident, short-distance migrant, and nomad". In much of Colombia it is "seasonal or uncommon" and in most of Ecuador "seasonal or erratic". In Peru its presence and numbers are "variable, suggesting migration or nomadic movements". The populations in far southern Brazil and northeastern Argentina move north for the austral winter. In several areas flocks of more than 100 individuals gather in the non-breeding season.

=== Feeding ===
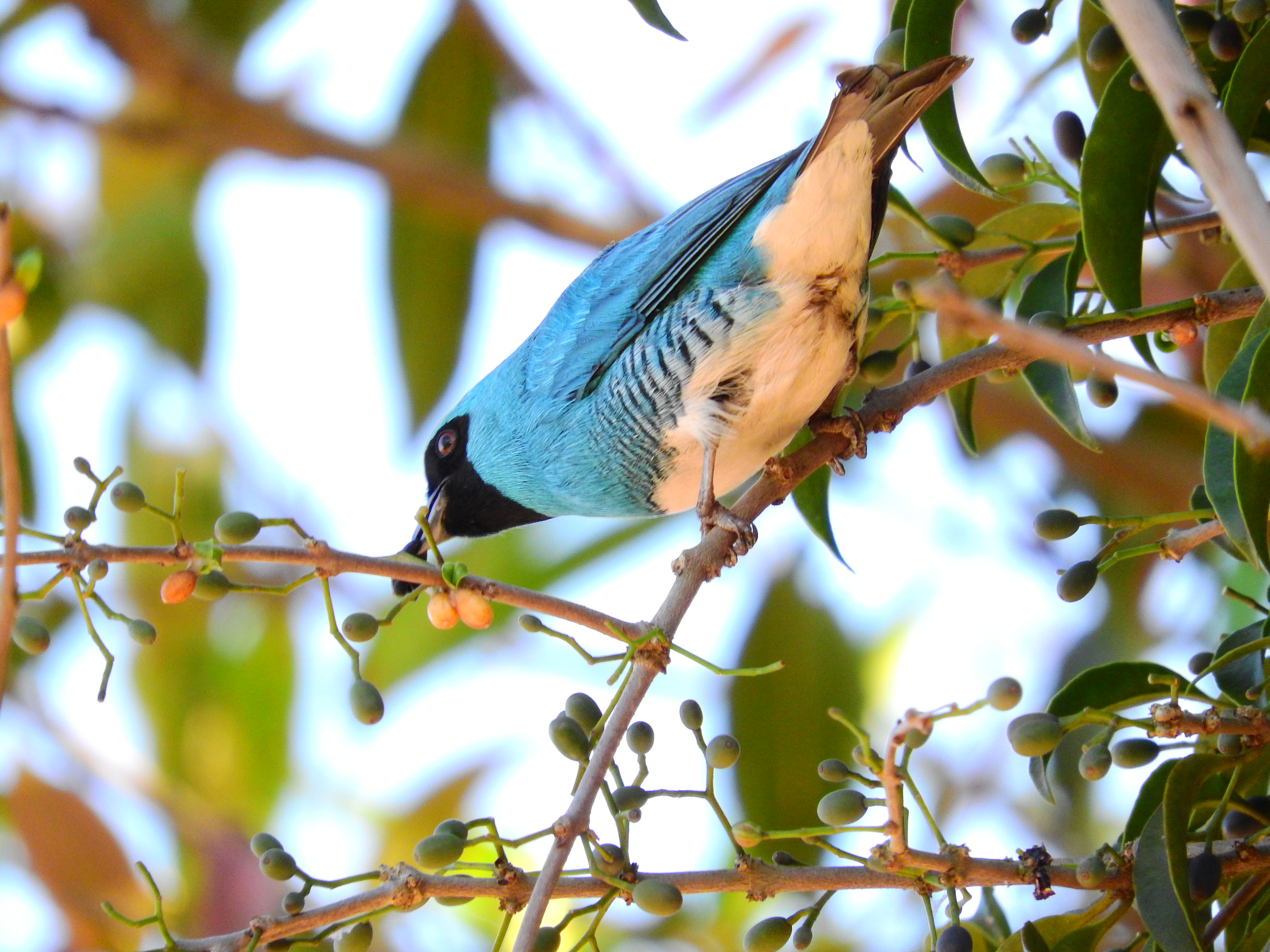
Male feeding on fruit

The swallow tanager feeds on fruits and arthropods, with relative numbers appearing to vary seasonally. The species is "notable gregarious" and forms small flocks during the breeding season and much larger ones outside it. However, it seldom joins mixed-species feeding flocks. Individuals and flocks often perch conspicuously in treetops. It plucks fruit while perched and with a brief hover after a sally. It takes many insects in mid-air, and often in a single flight takes more than one from a swarm of flying ants or termites.

=== Breeding ===
The swallow tanager's breeding seasons have not been fully defined. It spans February to June in Colombia, includes April and May in Venezuela, and spans at least August to October in southern Brazil. It sometimes breeds semi-colonially with several pairs in loose association. Males defend the immediate surroundings of the nest but not a larger territory. Pairs join and bond with bowing, hopping, and chasing displays. The species nests in cavities in substrates such as a wall of an abandoned building, an earthen bank, a stone wall, or a tree. It usually uses an existing cavity but will excavate one in soft earth. The female builds the nest, a cup made from plant fibers and apparently is always lined with thin black palm fibers. The clutch is usually three white eggs though four is known. The female alone incubates, for 13 to 17 days, and fledging occurs about 24 days after hatch. Both parents provision nestlings though females do more of the feeding.

=== Vocalization ===
The male swallow tanager's song is variable but generally "a fairly rapid series of c. 10–15 shrill or squeaky notes". In Brazil it is described as a "rapid series of alternating, extremely high fee and low, dry teh" notes. A description from Peru is "a slurred, jerky series of high squeaks and warbled phrases". It apparently calls more frequently than it sings, "a high, slightly blurred or buzzy and metallic tza-link or tz’sink...sometimes repeated at short intervals".

== Status ==
The IUCN has assessed the swallow tanager as being of Least Concern. It has an extremely large range; its estimated population of at least five million mature individuals is believed to be stable. No immediate threats have been identified. It is considered common in Colombia, widespread in Ecuador, "fairly common" in Peru, common as a breeder in Venezuela, and "frequent to uncommon" in Brazil. It occurs in many protected areas and "[o]nly a few areas within its extensive range are threatened with deforestation, and the species appears to prosper in partially disturbed areas if fruit resources reliable and suitable holes or cavities for nesting available".
