= Louis Auguste Joseph Desrousseaux =

French botanist

- Born: 27 July 1753
- Died: 20 January 1838 (aged 84)
- Scientific career
- Fields: Botany; Pteridology
- Author abbrev. (botany): Desr.

Louis Auguste Joseph Desrousseaux (27 July 1753 – 20 January 1838) was a French botanist and pteridologist. He was a contributor to the "Encyclopedia Botanique" of Lamarck, from 1783 to 1796.

Desrousseaux produced many works on new plant species, creating 414 new records.

In 1828, botanist Augustin Pyramus de Candolle (DC.) published Rousseauxia, a genus of flowering plants from Madagascar, belonging to the family Melastomataceae and named in honour of Louis Auguste Joseph Desrousseaux.

In addition to his industrial activities, he was interested in botany, particularly ferns, and participated in the writing of volume IV of Jean-Baptiste de Lamarck's Encyclopédie botanique and in the Botanique volumes of the Encyclopédie méthodique. He was a member of the Société linnéenne de Paris. Working on many unknown species, he is the author of 414 new descriptions. He bought the Château de Vandières in 1816 that his family still lives in.
