= Kuijt =

Kuijt, Kuyt, Cuijt or Cuyt ([ˈkœyt]) is a Dutch surname. It has its origin in kuute, a beer originally produced in Ghent in the middle-ages. The name may refer to the following notable people:

- Annie Cuyt (born 1956), Belgian computational mathematician
- Dirk Kuyt (born 1980), Dutch football player
- Evert Kuijt (1939–2021), Dutch writer and translator
- Job Kuijt (born 1930), Canadian botanist
- Ernie Kuyt (1920–2010), Canadian biologist, wildlife conservation
