= Julius Hermann Schultes =

Austrian botanist (1804–1840)

Julius Hermann Schultes (4 February 1804 in Vienna – 1 September 1840 in Munich) was an Austrian botanist from Vienna. He co-authored volume 7 of the Roemer & Schultes edition of the Systema Vegetabilium with his father Josef August Schultes (1773-1831).

He studied natural sciences, anatomy and medicine at the University of Landshut, earning his medical doctorate in 1825. After the death of his father in 1831, he settled in Munich as a general practitioner, but the death of his father and his struggling for general practice caused its toll on him, that he died in vain on 1 September 1840 at the young age of 36.

(The "Systema Vegetabilium" 16th edition was published by Julius Hermann Schultes' father Josef August Schultes and his colleague Johann Jacob Roemer who was a famous physician and professor of botany in Zurich, Switzerland)
