= August W. Eichler =

German botanist (1839-1887)

August Wilhelm Eichler
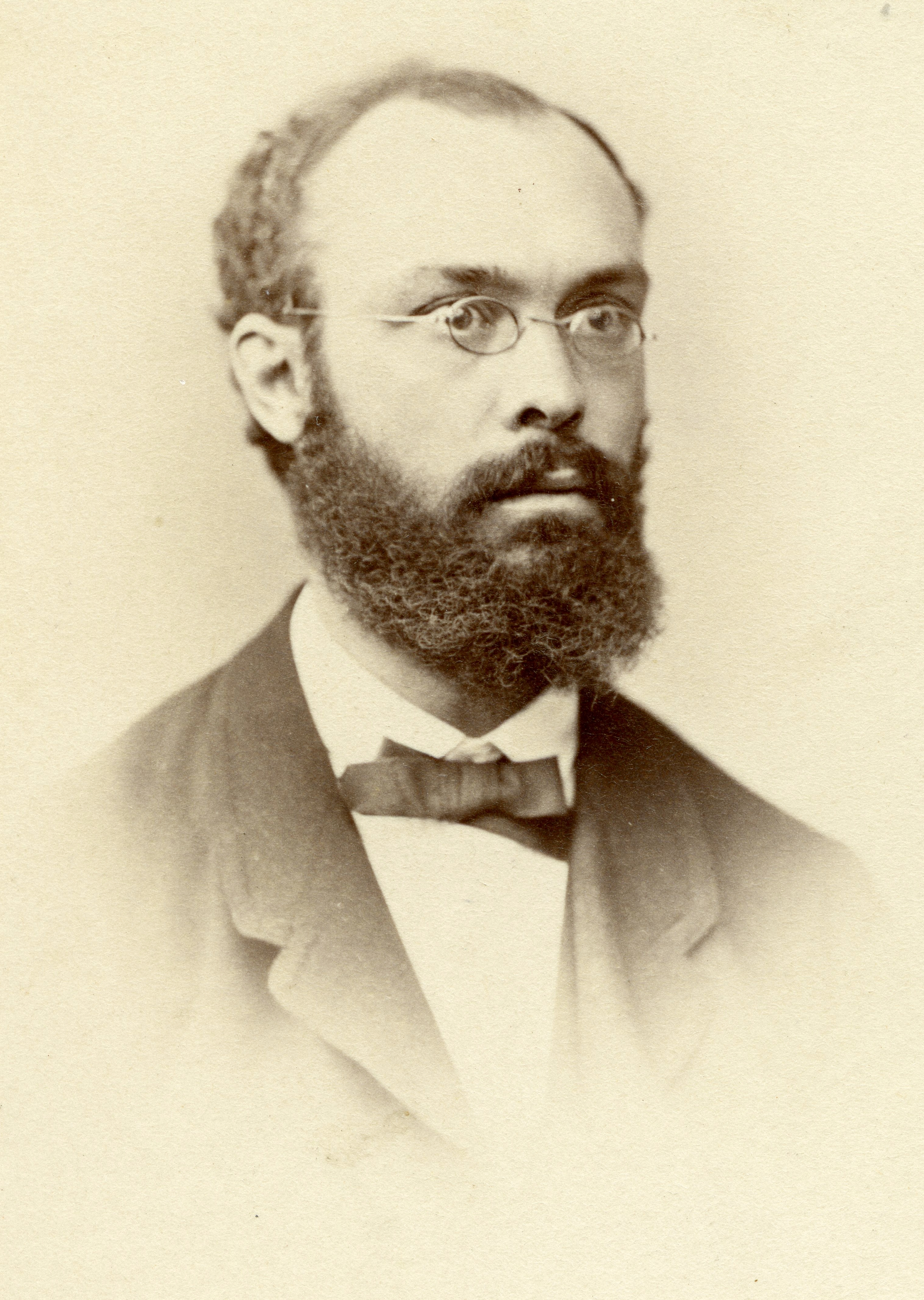
- A. W. Eichler
- Born: 22 April 1839; Neukirchen, Hesse
- Died: 2 March 1887 (aged 47); Berlin
- Scientific career
- Fields: Botany, Plant taxonomy
- Author abbrev. (botany): Eichler

August Wilhelm Eichler, also known under his Latinized name, Augustus Guilielmus Eichler (22 April 1839 – 2 March 1887), was a German botanist who developed a new system of classification of plants to reflect the concept of evolution. His author abbreviation in botany is Eichler.

== Biography ==
Born in Neukirchen, Hesse, Eichler studied at the University of Marburg, Germany, and in 1871 became Professor of Botany at Technische Hochschule (Technical University) of Graz and director of the botanical garden in that city. In 1872 he received an appointment at the University of Kiel, where he remained until 1878 when he became director of the herbarium at the University of Berlin. He died in Berlin on March 2, 1887, of leukaemia.

Eichler made important contributions to the study of the comparative structure of flowers (mainly on floral symmetry in his work Blütendiagramme). He wrote extensively on the Coniferae, Cycadaceae and other plant groups of Brazil.

== Eichler System ==
The Eichler System divided the plant kingdom into non-floral plants (Cryptogamae) and floral plants (Phanerogamae). It was the first to accept the concept of evolution and therefore also the first to be considered phylogenetic. Moreover, Eichler was the first taxonomist to separate the Phanerogamae into Angiosperms and Gymnosperms and the former into Monocotyledonae and Dicotyledonae.

The Eichler system was the foundation for Adolf Engler's System and was widely accepted in Europe and other parts of the world.

== Works ==
- Eichler, August W. (1875). Blüthendiagramme: construirt und erläutert. 2 vols [Floral diagrams]. Leipzig: W. Engelmann.
  - Volume I: 1875
  - Volume II: 1878
- Syllabus der Vorlesungen über Phanerogamenkunde Lipsius und Tischer, Kiel 1876.
  - Subsequent editions published as Syllabus der Vorlesungen über specielle und medicinisch-pharmaceutische Botanik, 2nd ed. 1880, 3rd ed. 1883, 4th ed. 1886, 5th 1890
    - Eichler, August W. (1880) [1876]. Syllabus der Vorlesungen über specielle und medicinisch-pharmaceutische Botanik (2nd ed.). Berlin: Borntraeger.
    - Eichler, August W. (1883) [1876]. Syllabus der Vorlesungen über specielle und medicinisch-pharmaceutische Botanik (3rd ed.). Berlin: Borntraeger.
    - Eichler, August W. (1886) [1876]. Syllabus der Vorlesungen über specielle und medicinisch-pharmaceutische Botanik (4th ed.). Berlin: Borntraeger.
    - Eichler, August W. (1890) [1876]. Syllabus der Vorlesungen über specielle und medicinisch-pharmaceutische Botanik (5th ed.). Berlin: Borntraeger.
- Flora Brasiliensis (Flora of Brazil) editor after death of Carl Friedrich Philipp von Martius in 1868 until 1887, succeeded by Ignatz Urban (Available online at Botanicus.org Website)
- Beiträge zur Morphologie und Systematik der Marantaceen (1884)
- Zur Entwickelungsgeschichte der Palmenblätter (1885)
- Caroli Frid. Phil. Martii Flora Brasiliensis, sive
- Flora Brasiliensis, enumeratio plantarum in Brasilia hactenus detectarum :quas suis aliorumque botanicorum studiis descriptas et methodo naturali digestas partim icone illustratas /ediderunt Carolus Fridericus Philippus de Martius et Augustus Guilielmus Eichler; iisque defunctis successor Ignatius Urban; with Martius, Karl Friedrich Philipp von, 1794-1868, Endlicher, István László, 1804-1849, Fenzl, Eduard, 1808-1879, Mary, Benj, Oldenburg, R.Urban and Ignaz, 1848-

== See also ==
- List of plants of Caatinga vegetation of Brazil
- List of plants of Cerrado vegetation of Brazil

== Notes ==
1. Aaron Goldberg (1986). "Classification, Evolution and Phylogeny of the Families of Dicotyledons". Smithsonian Contributions to Botany. 58: 1–314.
2. G. H. M. Lawrence (1951). Taxonomy of vascular plants.
3. Author Details: Eichler, August Wilhelm (1839-1887). International Plant Names Index.
4. Rines, George Edwin, ed. (1920). "Eichler, August Wilhelm" . Encyclopedia Americana.

== Bibliography ==
- August Wilhelm Eichler. Encyclopædia Britannica
- August Wilhelm Eichler. Proceedings of the American Academy of Arts and Sciences. Vol. 23, No. 2 (May, 1887 - May, 1888), pp. 355-356 Obituary
- History of Taxonomy: 1875-1926
- Annals of Botany 1887 Biography and list of publications
- Stuessy, Tod F. (2009). Plant taxonomy: the systematic evaluation of comparative data (2nd ed.). New York: Columbia University Press. ISBN 9780231518642.
