= Johann Centurius Hoffmannsegg =

German botanist, entomologist and ornithologist

- Born: 23 August 1766; Rammenau, Germany
- Died: 13 December 1849 (aged 83); Dresden, Germany
- Education: Leipzig, Göttingen
- Known for: Collections of plants and animals
- Scientific career
- Author abbrev. (botany): Hoffmanns.
- Author abbrev. (zoology): Hoffmannsegg

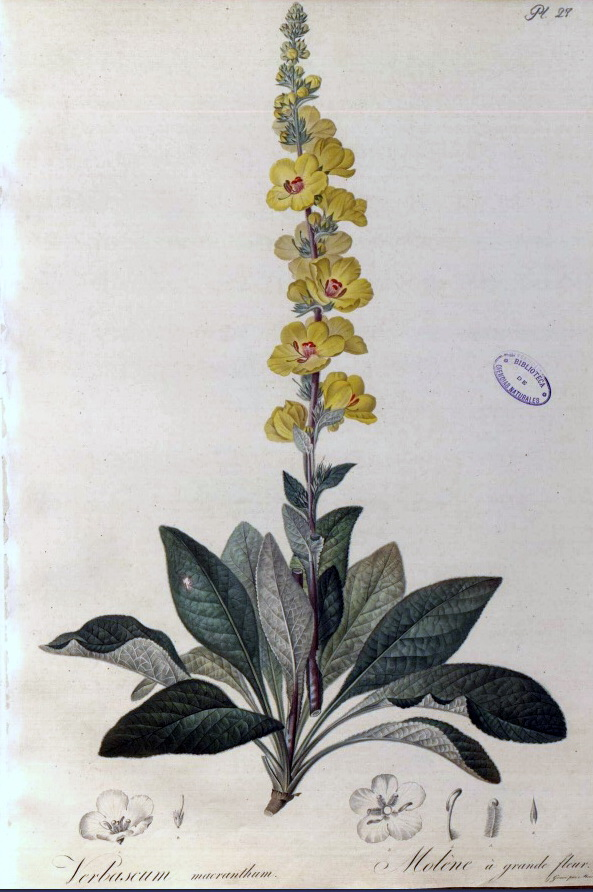
Verbascum macranthum Hoffmanns. & Link

Johann Centurius Hoffmann Graf von Hoffmannsegg (23 August 1766 – 13 December 1849) was a German botanist, entomologist and ornithologist. The standard author abbreviation Hoffmanns. is used to indicate this person as the author when citing a botanical name.

Hoffmannsegg was born at Rammenau and studied at Leipzig and Göttingen. He travelled through Europe acquiring vast collections of plants and animals. He visited Hungary, Austria and Italy in 1795–1796 and Portugal from 1797 to 1801. He sent his collections to Johann Karl Wilhelm Illiger, then in Brunswick, so that he could study them.

Hoffmannsegg worked in Berlin from 1804 to 1816, and was elected a member of the Academy of Science of the city in 1815. He was the founder of the zoological museum of Berlin in 1809. Hoffmannsegg proposed Illiger for the position of curator, and all the Hoffmannsegg's collections were then transferred to Berlin.

The legume genus Hoffmannseggia is named for him.
