= Philippe Édouard Léon Van Tieghem =

French botanist

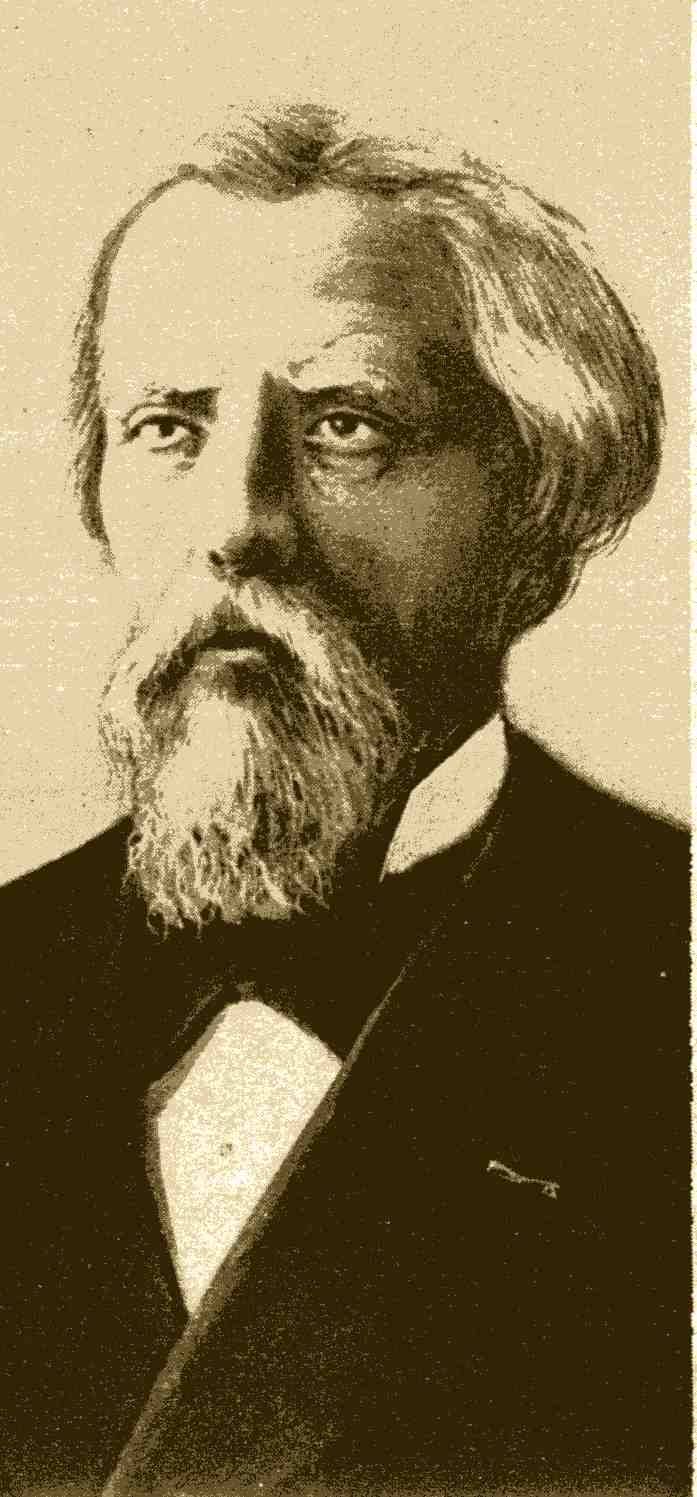
- Born: 19 April 1839; Baillleul, France
- Died: 28 April 1914 (aged 75)
- Citizenship: France
- Scientific career
- Fields: Botany
- Thesis: Recherches sur la fermentation de l'urée et de l'acide hippurique (1864)

Philippe Édouard Léon Van Tieghem (French pronunciation: [filip edwaʁ leɔ̃ van tiɡɛm]; 19 April 1839 – 28 April 1914) was a French botanist born in Baillleul in the département of Nord. He was one of the best known French botanists of the latter nineteenth century. The standard author abbreviation Tiegh. is used to indicate this person as the author when citing a botanical name.

== Life ==
Van Tieghem's father was a textile merchant who died of yellow fever in Martinique before he was born, and his mother shortly thereafter. One of five children, he obtained his baccalauréat in 1856, and continued his studies at the École Normale Supérieure, where after receiving agrégation, he worked in the laboratory of Louis Pasteur (1822–1895). Here he performed research involving the cultivation of mushrooms. He is credited with creation of the eponymous "Van Tieghem cell", a device mounted on a microscope slide that allows for observing the development of a fungus' mycelium.

In 1864 he earned his doctorate in physical sciences with a thesis titled Recherches sur la fermentation de l'urée et de l'acide hippurique, and two years later obtained a doctorate in natural history. From 1873 to 1886, he taught classes at the École centrale des arts et manufactures, and from 1878 to 1914, was a professor at the Muséum national d'histoire naturelle. Within this time period (1899–1914), he was also an instructor at the Institut agronomique in Paris. Van Tieghem became a member of the Société philomathique de Paris in 1871. In 1874 he translated the third edition of Julius von Sachs' Lehrbuch der Botanik textbook (1873) from German into French as Traité de botanique conforme à l'état présent de la science. Van Tieghem's own Traité de botanique appeared in 1884, in which he outlined his schema for taxonomic classification. He was the first, in 1876, to describe blastomycosis, a fungal infection that is also known as "Gilchrist disease", named after Thomas Casper Gilchrist (1862–1927), who published a treatise on the condition in 1896. He gained membership to the Académie des sciences, also in 1876. Van Tieghem wrote extensively on the mistletoe family of Loranthaceae, with much of his taxonomic work surviving to the present day. He died in Paris in 1914.

== Honours ==
He has been honoured in the naming of several plant taxa; In 1890, botanist Pierre published Tieghemella a genus in the family Sapotaceae. Then in 1959, R.K.Benj. published a genus of fungi as Tieghemiomyces (in the family Dimargaritaceae).

In 1909 he was named a Commandeur of the Légion d'honneur in recognition of his contributions to botany.

== Selected publications ==
- Recherches comparatives sur l'origine des membres endogènes dans les plantes vasculaires, 1889 - Comparative research on the origin of endogenous members of vascular plants.
- Eléments de botanique, 1886 2nd. ed. 1891, 2 vols., 3rd. ed. 1898, 4 vols. 5th ed. 1918 (Elements of botany)
- Traité de botanique 1884, 2nd ed. 1891
- L'Oeuf des Plantes considéré comme base de leur Classification, 1901.
- Nouvelles observations sur les Ochnacées, 1903 - New observations on Ochnaceae.
- Sur les Luxembourgiacées, 1904 - On Luxemburgiaceae.
- Travaux divers: Pistil et fruit des Labiées, Boragacées et des familles voisines: Divers modes de Placentation: Anthères hétérogènes. : Une graminée à rhizome schizostélique: A propos de la Strasburgérie, 1907 - Diverse works, Pistil and fruit of Labiatae, Boraginaceae, etc.

== System ==
Van Tieghem's primary grouping was into embranchements (branches), followed by sous-embranchement (sub-branches), classes, orders, families, genera, species and varieties.

His four branches (1st edition) were, as follows, with the Phanerogames divided into two sub-branches. The angiosperms contain two classes, Monocotyledonés and Dicotyledonés;

1. Thallophytes
2. Muscinées (mosses)
3. Cryptogames vasculaires
4. Phanerogames
  1. Gymnospermes
  2. Angiospermes
    1. Monocotyledonés
    2. Dicotyledonés

He further divided the Monocotyledonés into four orders (ordres), based just on the presence or absence of a perianth and the position of the ovary, which in turn were divided into families (familles); * Monocotyledonés,

  - Corolle nulle ovaire supère: Graminidées
  - Corolle sépaloïde ovaire supère: Joncinées
  - Corolle pétaloïde ovaire supère: Liliinées
  - Corolle pétaloïde ovaire infère: Iridinées

The Liliinées order contained five families;

1. Alismacées
2. Commelinacées
3. Xyridacées
4. Pontederiacées
5. Liliacées

== Bibliography ==
- Dahlgren, Rolf; Clifford, H. T. (1982). The monocotyledons: A comparative study. London and New York: Academic Press. ISBN 9780122006807.
- Van Tieghem, Philippe Édouard Léon (1884). Traité de botanique (in French) (1st ed.). Paris: Savy. (also available here, at Gallica)
- Van Tieghem, Philippe Édouard Léon (1891) [1884]. Traité de botanique (in French) (2nd ed.). Paris: Savy.
- Chodat, R (1915). "Philippe van Tieghem 1839–1914". Berichte der Deutschen Botanischen Gesellschaft (in German). 33 (11): 5–10. Bibcode:1915BDBG...33....5C. doi:10.1111/j.1438-8677.1915.tb07035.x. S2CID 178961018.
- "Philippe van Tieghem (1839-1914)". data.bnf.fr. Bibliothèque nationale de France. 9 October 2015.
- Nougarède, A (2008). "Van Tieghem, Philippe". Complete Dictionary of Scientific Biography. Vol. 13. Scribner. pp. 405–406.
- Isely, Duane (1994). One Hundred and One Botanists. Ames: Iowa State University Press. ISBN 978-0-8138-2498-7.
