= Hutchinson system =

System of plant classification devised by John Hutchison (1923)

A system of plant taxonomy by John Hutchinson, the Hutchinson system, was published as The families of flowering plants, arranged according to a new system based on their probable phylogeny (two volumes) in three editions; 1st edition 1926–1934; 2nd edition 1959; 3rd edition, 1973. This classification is according to the 1st Edition Volume 1: Dicotyledonae 1926 and Volume 2:Monocotyledonae 1934.

Hutchinson's system was one of the most influential revisions of taxonomy in the early twentieth century. Hutchinson is known for his 24 dicta on the classification of flowering plants. A key feature of his third edition in 1973 was based on the habit of the plant, namely that herbaceous plants or Herbaceae are phylogenetically more recent than woody plants or Lignosae.

== Phylum Angiospermae ==
=== Subphylum Monocotyledons ===
Divisions

1. Calyciferae
2. Corolliferae
3. Glumiflorae

==== Calyciferae ====
- 1 divisio Calyciferae
  ordo Butomales
  Hydrocharitaceae
  Butomaceae
  ordo Alismatales
  Alismataceae
  Scheuchzeriaceae
  Petrosaviaceae
  ordo Triuridales
  Triuridaceae
  ordo Juncaginales
  Juncaginaceae
  Lilaeaceae syn.: Heterostylaceae, syn. of Juncaginaceae
  Posidoniaceae
  ordo Aponogetonales
  Aponogetonaceae
  Zosteraceae
  ordo Potamogetonales
  Potamogetonaceae
  Ruppiaceae
  ordo Najadales
  Zannichelliaceae
  Najadaceae
  ordo Commelinales
  Commelinaceae
  Flagellariaceae
  Mayacaceae
  ordo Xyridales
  Xyridaceae
  Rapateaceae
  ordo Eriocaulales
  Eriocaulaceae
  ordo Bromeliales
  Bromeliaceae
  ordo Zingiberales
  Musaceae
  Strelitziaceae
  Lowiaceae
  Zingiberaceae
  Cannaceae
  Marantaceae

==== Corolliferae ====
- 2 divisio Corolliferae
  ordo Liliales
  Liliaceae

tribes
Anguillarieae
Colchiceae
Helonideae
Iphigenieae
Narthecieae
Polygonateae
Tricyrtideae
Tulipeae
Uvularieae
Veratreae

- Tecophilaeaceae
  Trilliaceae
  Pontederiaceae
  Smilacaceae
  Ruscaceae
  ordo Alstroemeriales
  Alstroemeriaceae
  Petermanniaceae
  Philesiaceae
  ordo Arales
  Araceae
  Lemnaceae
  ordo Typhales
  Sparganiaceae
  Typhaceae
  ordo Amaryllidales
  Amaryllidaceae
  tribe Agapantheae
  tribe Allieae
  tribe Gilliesieae
  ordo Iridales
  Iridaceae
  ordo Dioscoreales
  Stenomeridaceae
  Trichopodaceae
  Roxburghiaceae
  Dioscoreaceae
  ordo Agavales
  Xanthorrhoeaceae
  Agavaceae
  ordo Palmales
  Palmae
  ordo Pandanales
  Pandanaceae
  ordo Cyclanthales
  Cyclanthaceae
  ordo Haemodorales
  Haemodoraceae
  Hypoxidaceae
  Velloziaceae
  Apostasiaceae
  Taccaceae
  Philydraceae
  ordo Burmanniales
  Burmanniaceae
  Corsiaceae
  Thismiaceae
  ordo Orchidales
  Orchidaceae

==== Glumiflorae ====
- 3 divisio Glumiflorae
  ordo Juncales
  Juncaceae
  Thurniaceae
  Restionaceae
  Centrolepidaceae
  ordo Cyperales
  Cyperaceae
  ordo Graminales
  Gramineae

=== Subphylum Dicotyledons ===
Divisions

1. Archychlamydeae (Polypetalae)
2. Metachlamydeae (Gamopetalae)

==== Archychlamydeae ====
- 1 divisio Archychlamydeae
  ordo Magnoliales
  Magnoliaceae
  Winteraceae
  Schisandraceae as Schizandraceae
  Himantandraceae
  Lactoridaceae
  Trochodendraceae
  Cercidiphyllaceae
  ordo Annonales as Anonales
  Annonaceae as Anonaceae
  Eupomatiaceae
  ordo Laurales
  Monimiaceae
  Lauraceae
  Gomortegaceae
  Hernandiaceae
  Myristicaceae
  ordo Ranales
  Ranunculaceae
  Cabombaceae
  Ceratophyllaceae
  Nymphaeaceae
  ordo Berberidales
  Berberidaceae
  Circaeasteraceae
  Lardizabalaceae
  Sargentodoxaceae
  Menispermaceae
  ordo Aristolochiales
  Aristolochiaceae
  Cytinaceae syn.: Rafflesiaceae
  Hydnoraceae
  Nepenthaceae
  ordo Piperales
  Saururaceae
  Piperaceae
  Chloranthaceae
  Lacistemataceae
  ordo Rhoeadales
  Papaveraceae
  Fumariaceae
  ordo Loasales
  Loasaceae
  Turneraceae
  ordo Capparidales
  Capparaceae as Capparidaceae [sic]
  Moringaceae
  Tovariaceae
  ordo Cruciales
  Cruciferae
  ordo Violales
  Violaceae
  Resedaceae
  ordo Polygalales
  Polygalaceae
  Trigoniaceae
  Vochysiaceae
  ordo Saxifragales
  Crassulaceae
  Cephalotaceae
  Saxifragaceae
  ordo Sarraceniales
  Droseraceae
  Sarraceniaceae
  ordo Podostemonales
  Podostemaceae as Podostemonaceae [sic]
  Hydrostachyaceae
  ordo Caryophyllales
  Elatinaceae
  Caryophyllaceae
  Molluginaceae
  Ficoidaceae syn.:Aizoaceae
  Portulacaceae
  ordo Polygonales
  Polygonaceae
  Illecebraceae
  ordo Chenopodiales
  Phytolaccaceae
  Cynocrambaceae syn.:Theligonaceae
  Chenopodiaceae
  Bataceae as Batidaceae [sic]
  Amaranthaceae as Amarantaceae [sic]
  Basellaceae
  ordo Geraniales
  Linaceae
  Zygophyllaceae
  Geraniaceae
  Limnanthaceae
  Oxalidaceae
  Tropaeolaceae
  Balsaminaceae
  ordo Lythrales
  Lythraceae
  Crypteroniaceae
  Sonneratiaceae
  Punicaceae
  Oliniaceae
  Onagraceae
  Haloragaceae as Halorrhagaceae [sic]
  Callitrichaceae
  ordo Thymelaeales
  Thymelaeaceae
  Geissolomataceae
  Penaeaceae
  Nyctaginaceae
  ordo Proteales
  Proteaceae
  ordo Dilleniales
  Dilleniaceae
  Crossosomataceae
  ordo Coriariales
  Coriariaceae
  ordo Pittosporales
  Pittosporaceae
  Byblidaceae
  Tremandraceae
  ordo Bixales
  Bixaceae
  Cochlospermaceae
  Flacourtiaceae
  Samydaceae
  Canellaceae
  Cistaceae
  Frankeniaceae
  ordo Tamaricales
  Tamaricaceae
  Malesherbiaceae
  Fouquieriaceae as Fouquieraceae [sic]
  ordo Passiflorales
  Passifloraceae
  Achariaceae
  ordo Cucurbitales
  Cucurbitaceae
  Begoniaceae
  Datiscaceae
  Caricaceae
  ordo Cactales
  Cactaceae
  ordo Theales
  Theaceae
  Medusagynaceae
  Marcgraviaceae
  Caryocaraceae
  Actinidiaceae
  Saurauiaceae
  Ochnaceae
  Ancistrocladaceae
  Dipterocarpaceae
  Chlaenaceae syn.: Sarcolaenaceae
  ordo Myrtales
  Myrtaceae
  Lecythidaceae
  Melastomataceae as Melastomaceae
  Combretaceae
  Rhizophoraceae
  ordo Guttiferales
  Hypericaceae
  Eucryphiaceae
  Quiinaceae
  Guttiferae
  ordo Tiliales
  Scytopetalaceae
  Tiliaceae
  Gonystylaceae
  Sterculiaceae
  Bombacaceae
  ordo Malvales
  Malvaceae
  ordo Malpighiales
  Malpighiaceae
  Humiriaceae
  Erythroxylaceae
  ordo Euphorbiales
  Euphorbiaceae
  ordo Cunoniales
  Cunoniaceae
  Brunelliaceae
  Escalloniaceae
  Greyiaceae [original family description]
  Grossulariaceae
  Hydrangeaceae
  ordo Rosales
  Rosaceae
  Chailletiaceae syn.: Dichapetalaceae
  Calycanthaceae
  ordo Leguminosae
  Mimosaceae
  Caesalpiniaceae
  Papilionaceae syn.: Fabaceae
  ordo Hamamelidales
  Bruniaceae
  Stachyuraceae
  Hamamelidaceae
  Eucommiaceae
  Myrothamnaceae
  Buxaceae
  Platanaceae
  ordo Salicales
  Salicaceae
  ordo Garryales
  Garryaceae
  ordo Leitneriales
  Leitneriaceae
  ordo Myricales
  Myricaceae
  ordo Balanopsidales
  Balanopaceae as Balanopsidaceae [sic]
  ordo Fagales
  Betulaceae
  Corylaceae
  Fagaceae
  ordo Casuarinales
  Casuarinaceae
  ordo Urticales
  Ulmaceae
  Barbeyaceae
  Moraceae
  Scyphostegiaceae [original family description]
  Urticaceae
  Cannabaceae as Cannabinaceae [sic]
  ordo Celastrales
  Aquifoliaceae
  Empetraceae
  Celastraceae
  Corynocarpaceae
  Cyrillaceae
  Cneoraceae
  Pandaceae
  Hippocrateaceae
  Icacinaceae
  Salvadoraceae
  Stackhousiaceae
  ordo Olacales
  Olacaceae
  Opiliaceae
  ordo Santalales
  Octoknemaceae as Oktoknemataceae [sic]
  Loranthaceae
  Santalaceae
  Grubbiaceae
  Misodendraceae as Myzodendraceae [sic]
  Balanophoraceae
  ordo Rhamnales
  Rhamnaceae
  Elaeagnaceae
  Heteropyxidaceae
  Ampelidaceae syn.:Vitaceae
  ordo Rutales
  Rutaceae
  Simaroubaceae as Simarubaceae [sic]
  Burseraceae
  ordo Meliales
  Meliaceae
  ordo Sapindales
  Sapindaceae
  Akaniaceae
  Aceraceae
  Sabiaceae
  Melianthaceae
  Didiereaceae
  Staphyleaceae
  Anacardiaceae
  Connaraceae
  ordo Juglandales
  Juglandaceae
  Julianiaceae
  ordo Umbelliflorae
  Cornaceae
  Alangiaceae
  Nyssaceae
  Araliaceae
  Umbelliferae

==== Metachlamydeae ====
- 2 divisio Metachlamydeae
  ordo Ericales
  Clethraceae
  Ericaceae
  Vacciniaceae
  Epacridaceae
  Monotropaceae
  Pyrolaceae
  Diapensiaceae
  Lennoaceae
  ordo Ebenales
  Ebenaceae
  Sapotaceae
  ordo Myrsinales
  Myrsinaceae
  ordo Styracales
  Styracaceae
  Symplocaceae
  Diclidantheraceae
  Lissocarpaceae
  ordo Loganiales
  Loganiaceae
  Oleaceae
  ordo Apocynales
  Apocynaceae
  Asclepiadaceae
  ordo Rubiales
  Rubiaceae
  Caprifoliaceae
  ordo Asterales
  Adoxaceae
  Valerianaceae
  Dipsacaceae
  Calyceraceae
  Compositae
  ordo Gentianales
  Gentianaceae
  ordo Primulales
  Primulaceae
  Plumbaginaceae
  ordo Plantaginales
  Plantaginaceae
  ordo Campanales
  Campanulaceae
  Lobeliaceae
  Goodeniaceae
  Stylidiaceae
  ordo Polemoniales
  Polemoniaceae
  Hydrophyllaceae
  ordo Boraginales
  Boraginaceae
  ordo Solanales
  Solanaceae
  Convolvulaceae
  ordo Personales
  Scrophulariaceae
  Orobanchaceae
  Lentibulariaceae
  Columelliaceae
  Gesneriaceae
  Bignoniaceae
  Pedaliaceae
  Acanthaceae
  ordo Lamiales
  Globulariaceae
  Myoporaceae
  Selaginaceae
  Verbenaceae
  Labiatae

== Bibliography ==
- Columbus, J. T.; Friar, E. A.; Porter, J. M.; Prince, L. M.; Simpson, M. G., eds. (2006). "Symposium issue: Monocots: comparative biology and evolution (excluding Poales). Proceedings of the Third International Conference on the Comparative Biology of the Monocotyledons, 31 Mar–4 Apr 2003". Aliso. 22 (1). Claremont, Ca.: Rancho Santa Ana Botanic Garden. ISSN 0065-6275.
- Fay, M. F.; Chase, M. W.; Ronsted, N.; Devey, D. S.; Pillon, Y.; Pires, J. C.; Petersen, G.; Seberg, O.; Davis, J. I. Phylogenetics of Liliales: summarized evidence from combined analyses of five plastid and one mitochondrial loci. pp. 559–565. In Columbus et al. (2006)
- Hutchinson, J. (1923). "Contributions towards a Phylogenetic Classification of Flowering Plants. I". Bulletin of Miscellaneous Information (Royal Botanic Gardens, Kew). 1923 (2): 65–89. doi:10.2307/4118622. ISSN 0366-4457. JSTOR 4118622.
- Hutchinson, John (1934). The families of flowering plants, arranged according to a new system based on their probable phylogeny. 2 vols (1st ed.). Macmillan. Volume 1: Dicotyledonae 1926, Volume 2: Monocotyledonae 1934.
- Hutchinson, John (1959). The families of flowering plants, arranged according to a new system based on their probable phylogeny. 2 vols (2nd ed.). Macmillan., Volume 2 at Internet Archive, Available to borrow: 2 vols
- Hutchinson, John (1973). The families of flowering plants, arranged according to a new system based on their probable phylogeny. 2 vols (3rd ed.). Oxford University Press.
  - Gundersen, Alfred (1926). "The Classification of Dicotyledons". Torreya (Review). 26 (4): 70–75. ISSN 0096-3844. JSTOR 40596468.
- Datta, Subhash Chandra (1988). Systematic Botany (4 ed.). New Delhi: New Age Intl. ISBN 8122400132.
