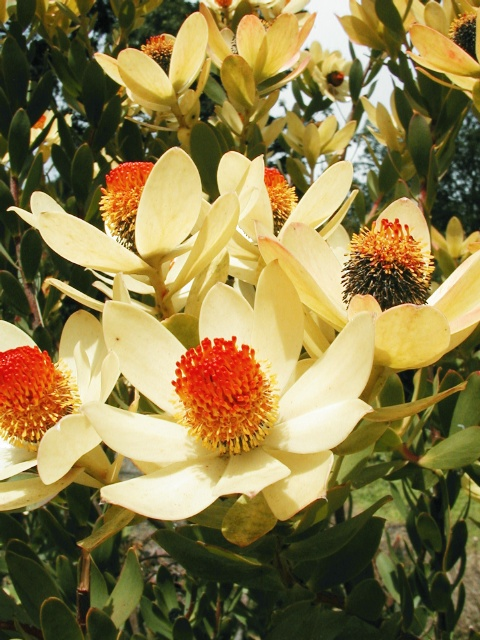

Conservation status
- Vulnerable (IUCN 3.1)

Scientific classification
- Kingdom: Plantae
- Clade: Embryophytes
- Clade: Tracheophytes
- Clade: Angiosperms
- Clade: Eudicots
- Order: Proteales
- Family: Proteaceae
- Genus: Leucadendron
- Species: L. discolor

Binomial name
- Leucadendron discolor E.Phillips & Hutch.

= Leucadendron discolor =

Species of plant endemic to South Africa

Leucadendron discolor is a species of plant in the family Proteaceae. It is endemic to the Cape Provinces of South Africa. It is threatened by habitat loss. In English the plant is known as the Piketberg Conebush and in Afrikaans as the Rooitolbos. L. discolor is a slow growing perennial. Growth of the root system and propagation, from a seed to the plant's first flower, can take up to two years. The male L. discolor 'Sunset' flowers exuberantly during early spring exposing a colorful flower head during this time. The flower head is composed of a dome-like receptacle, and is densely covered with small male flowers. These plants are only able to reproduce after their third year of life.

The species has potential to be commercially exported using new methods that aide in rooting, such as Indole-3-butyric acid (IBA).

== Gallery ==
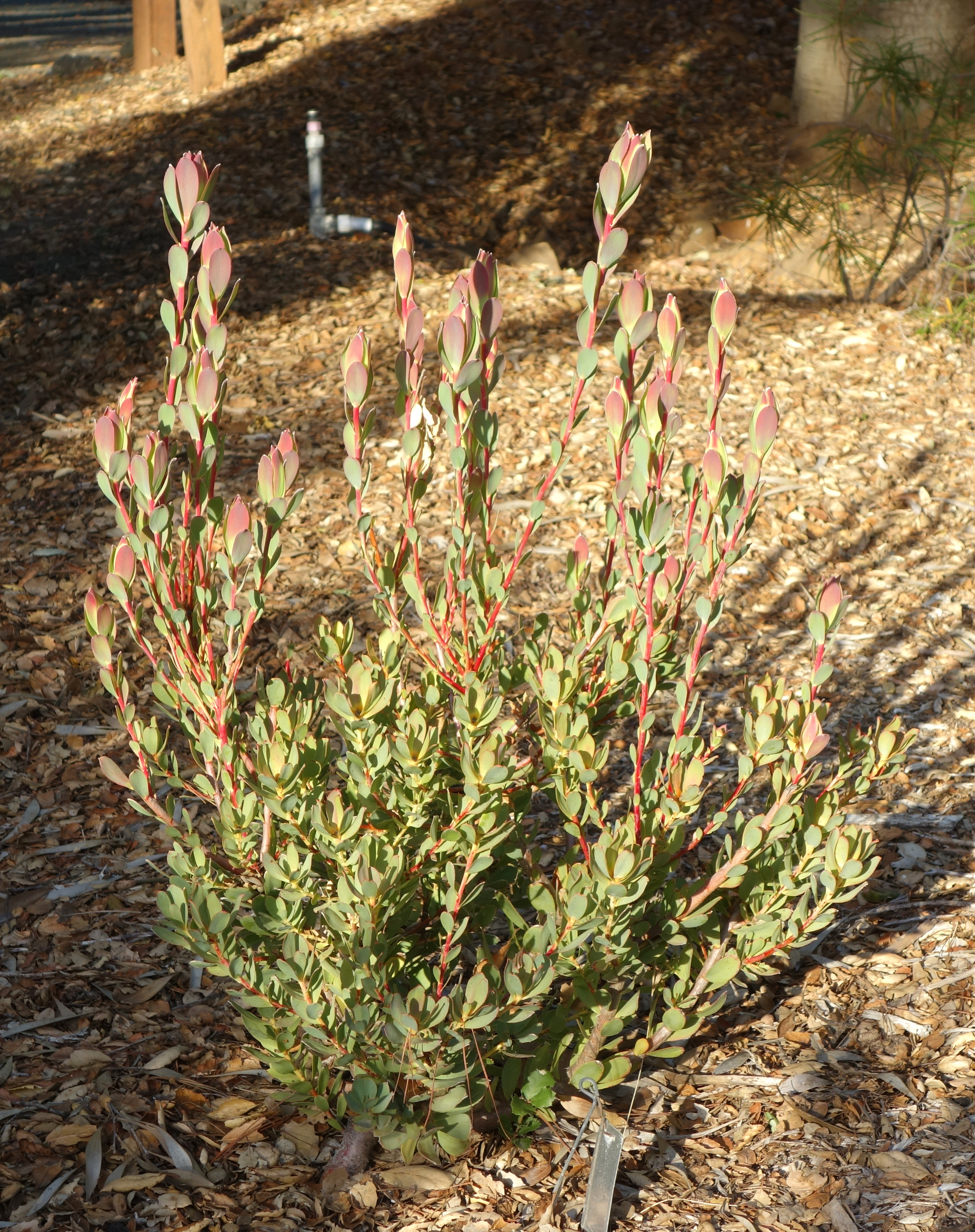

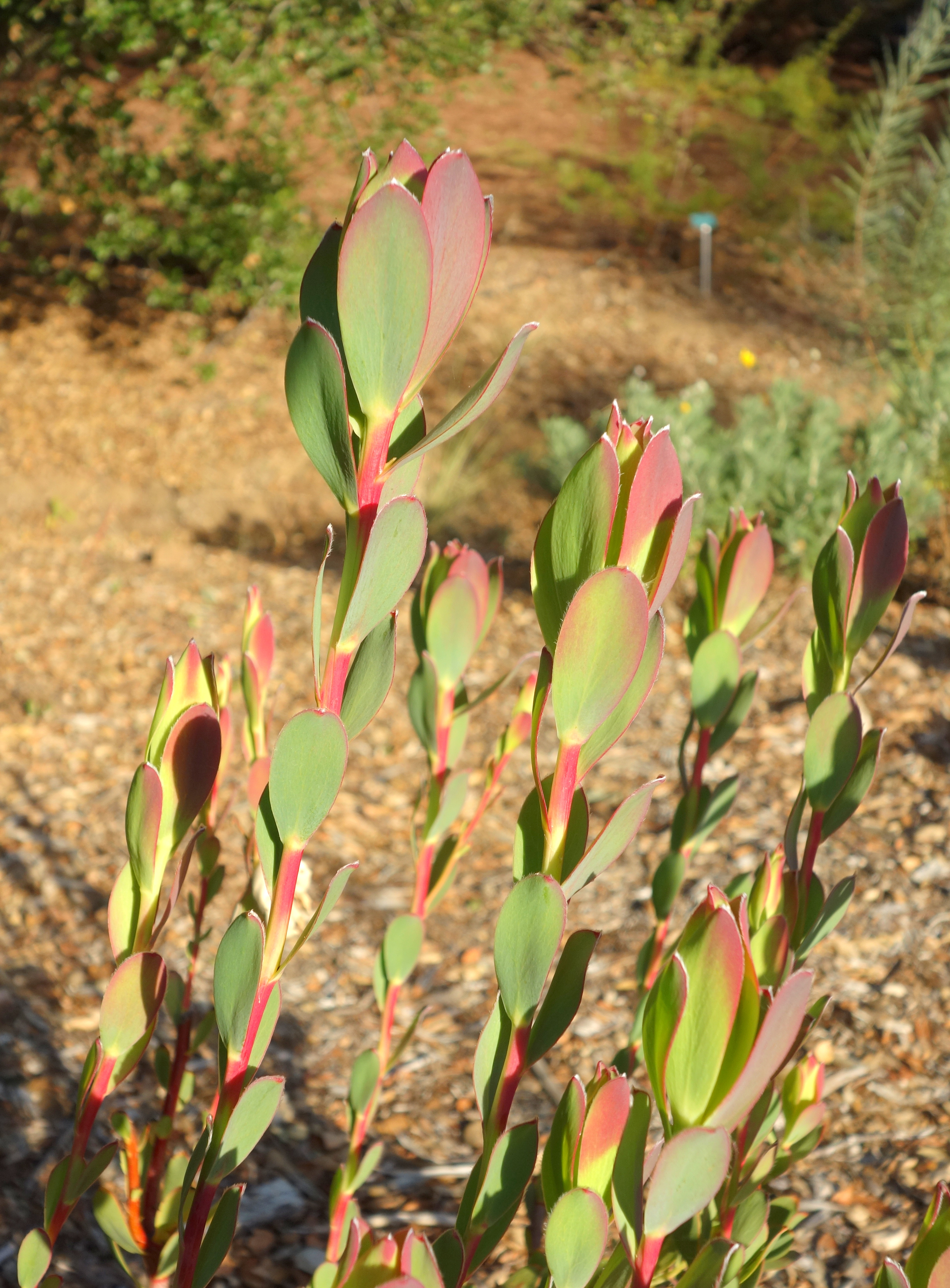

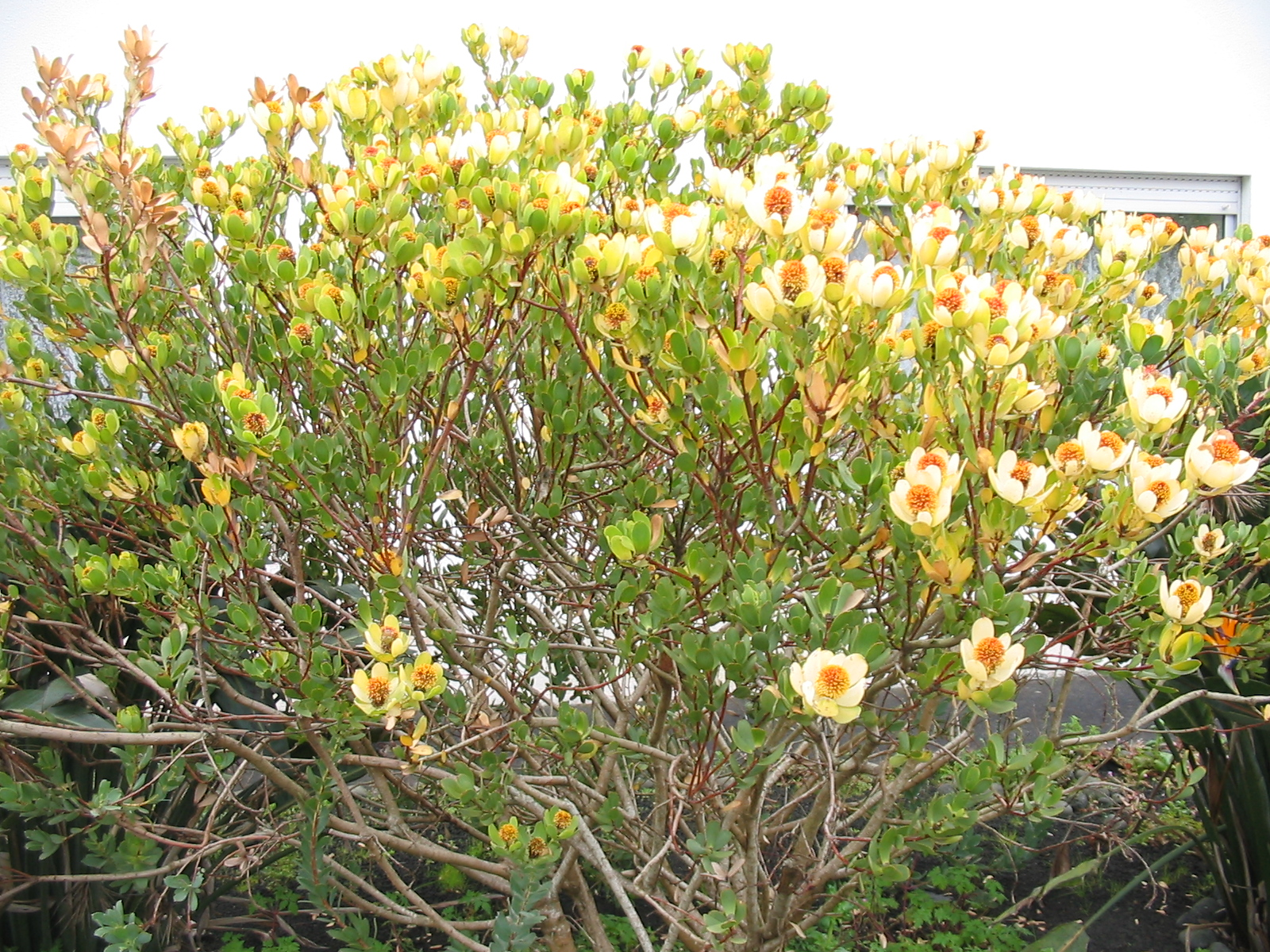

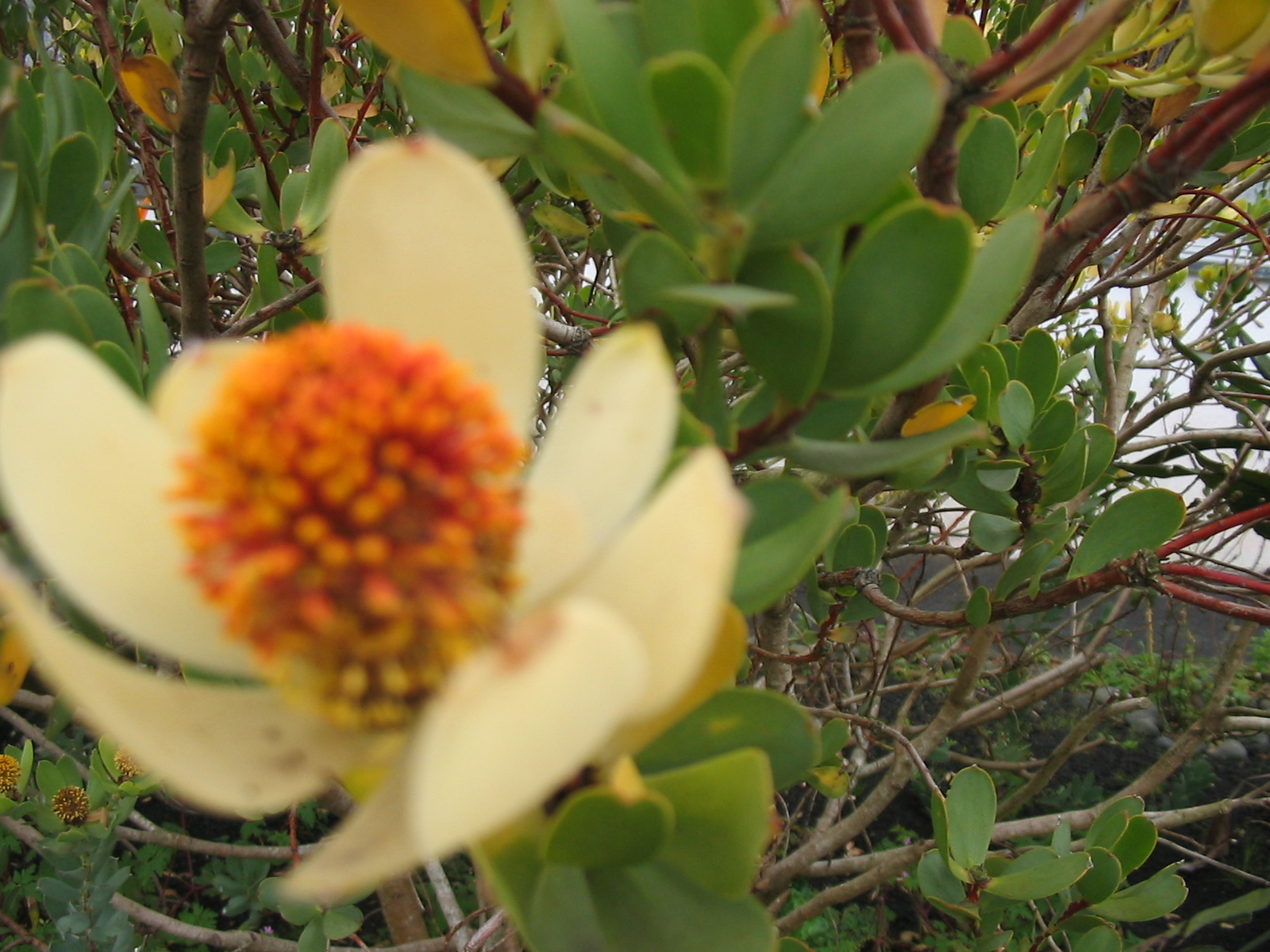

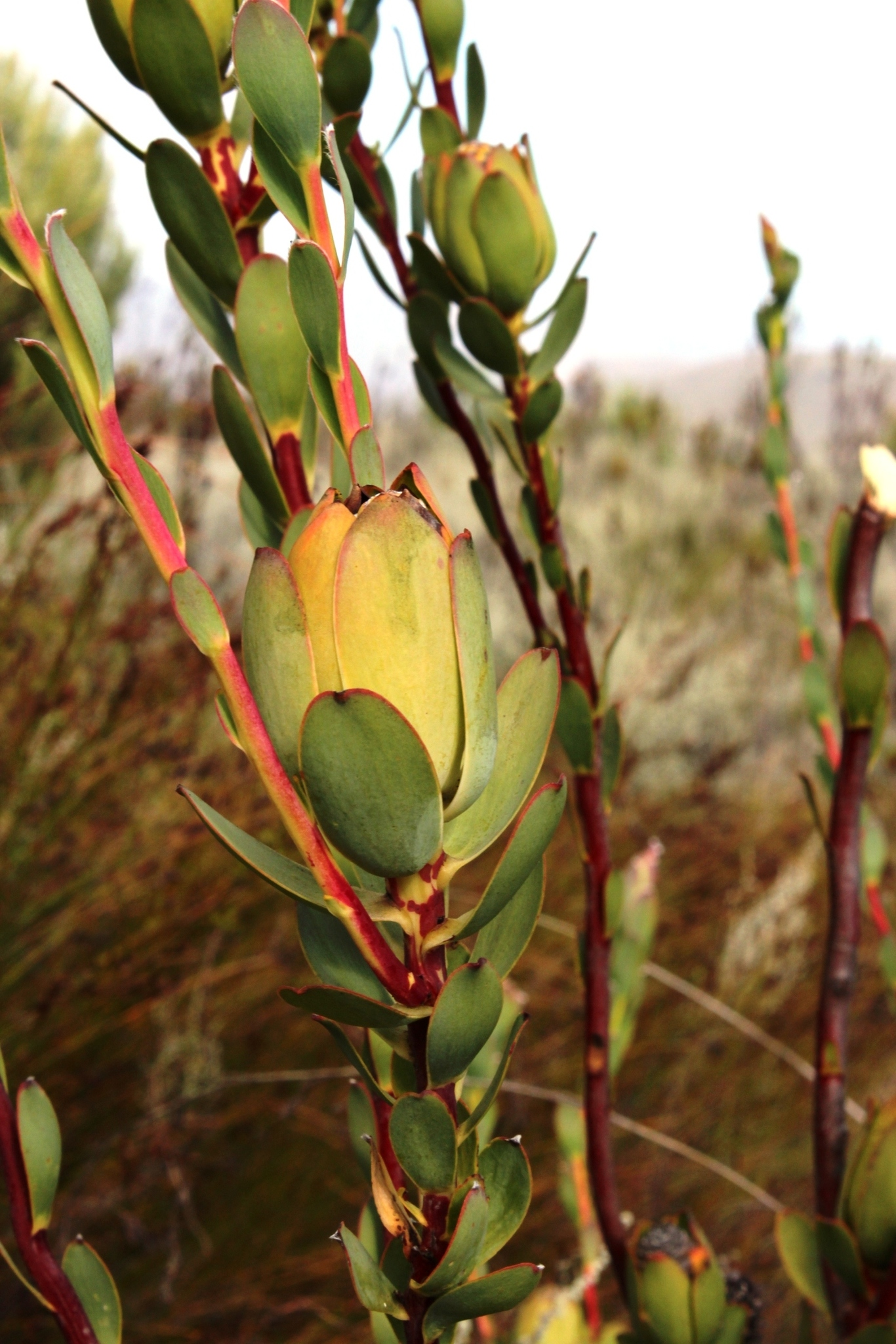

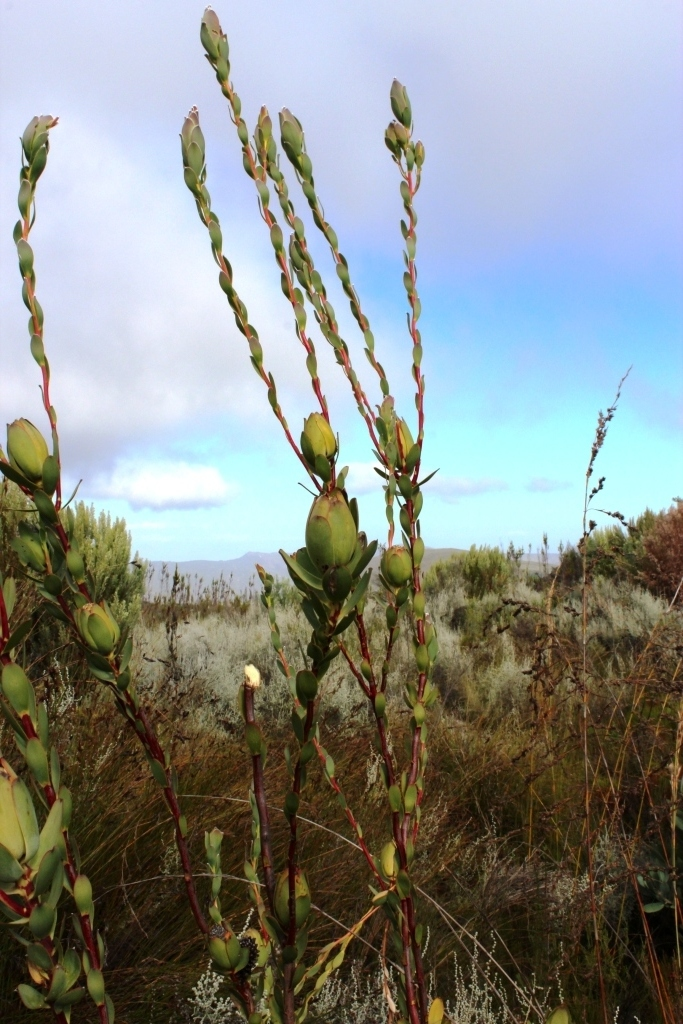

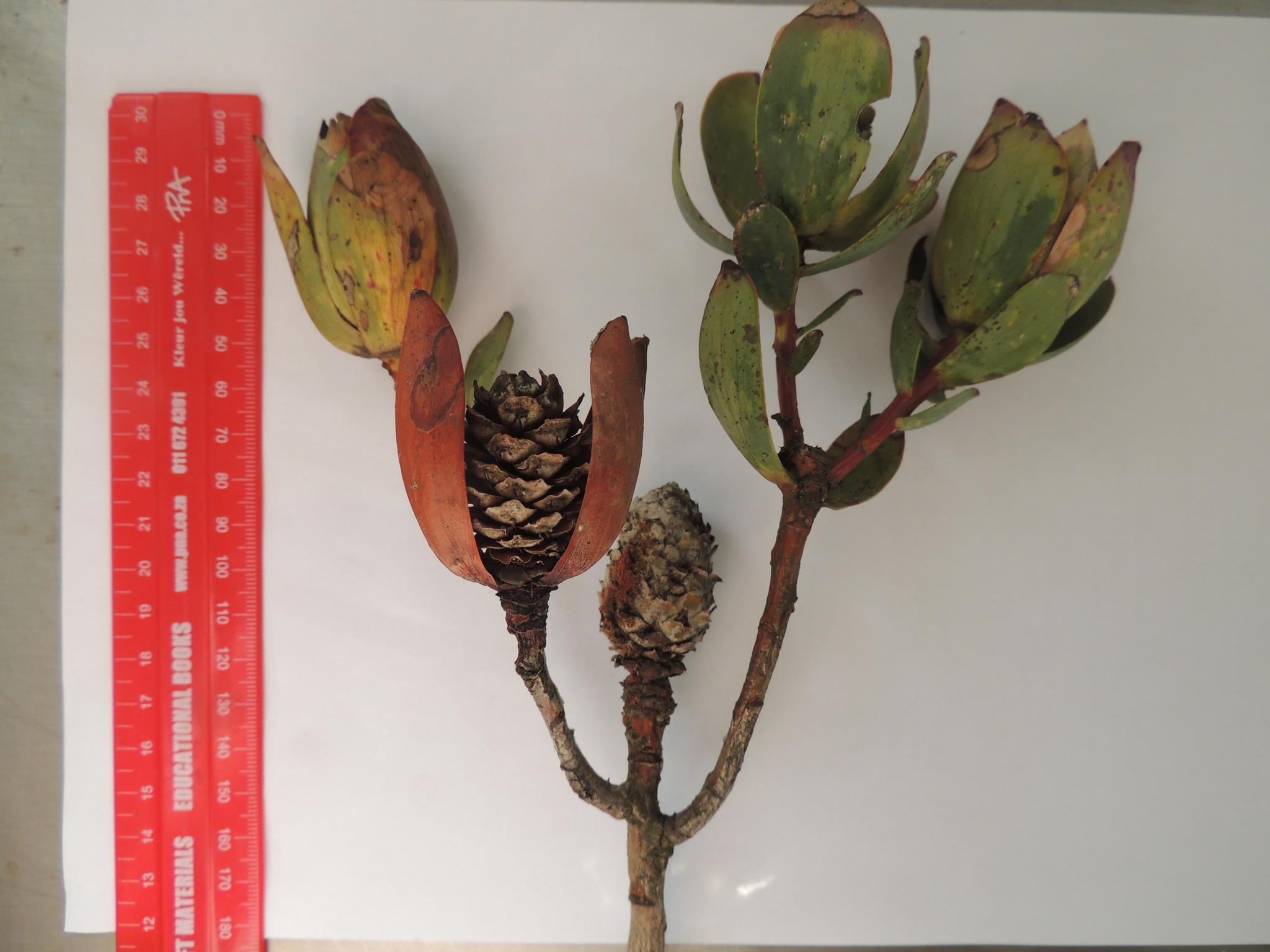

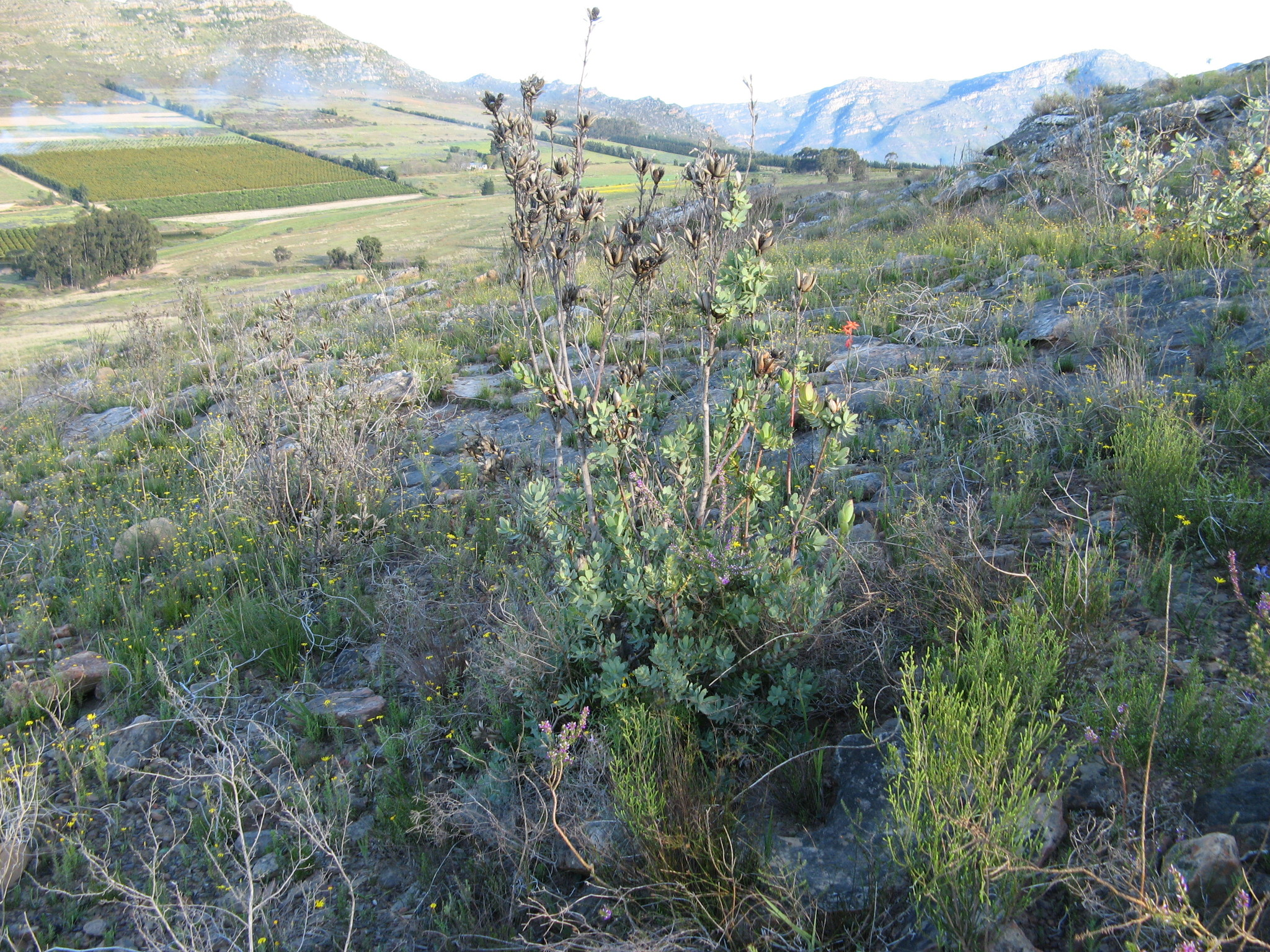

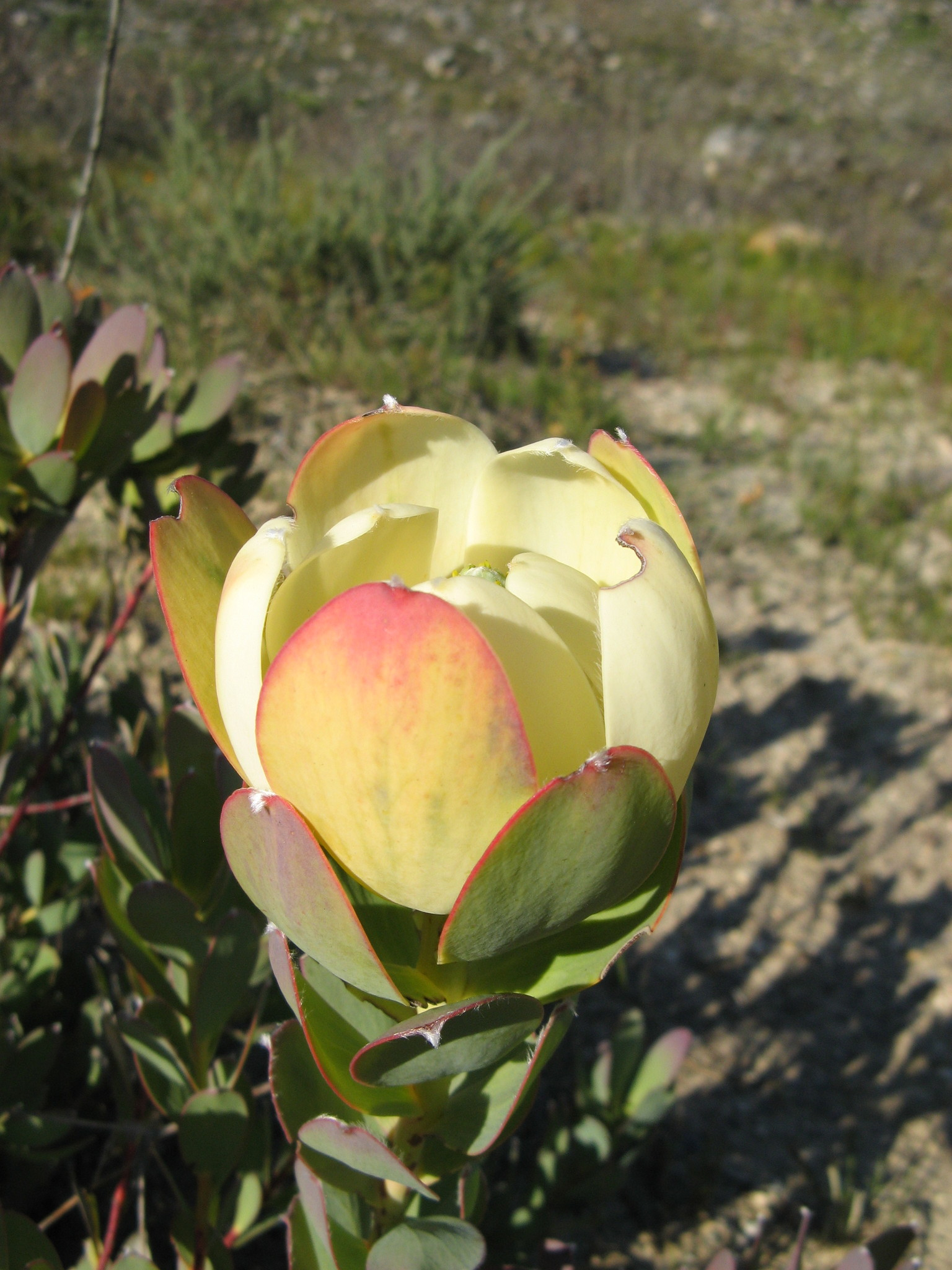

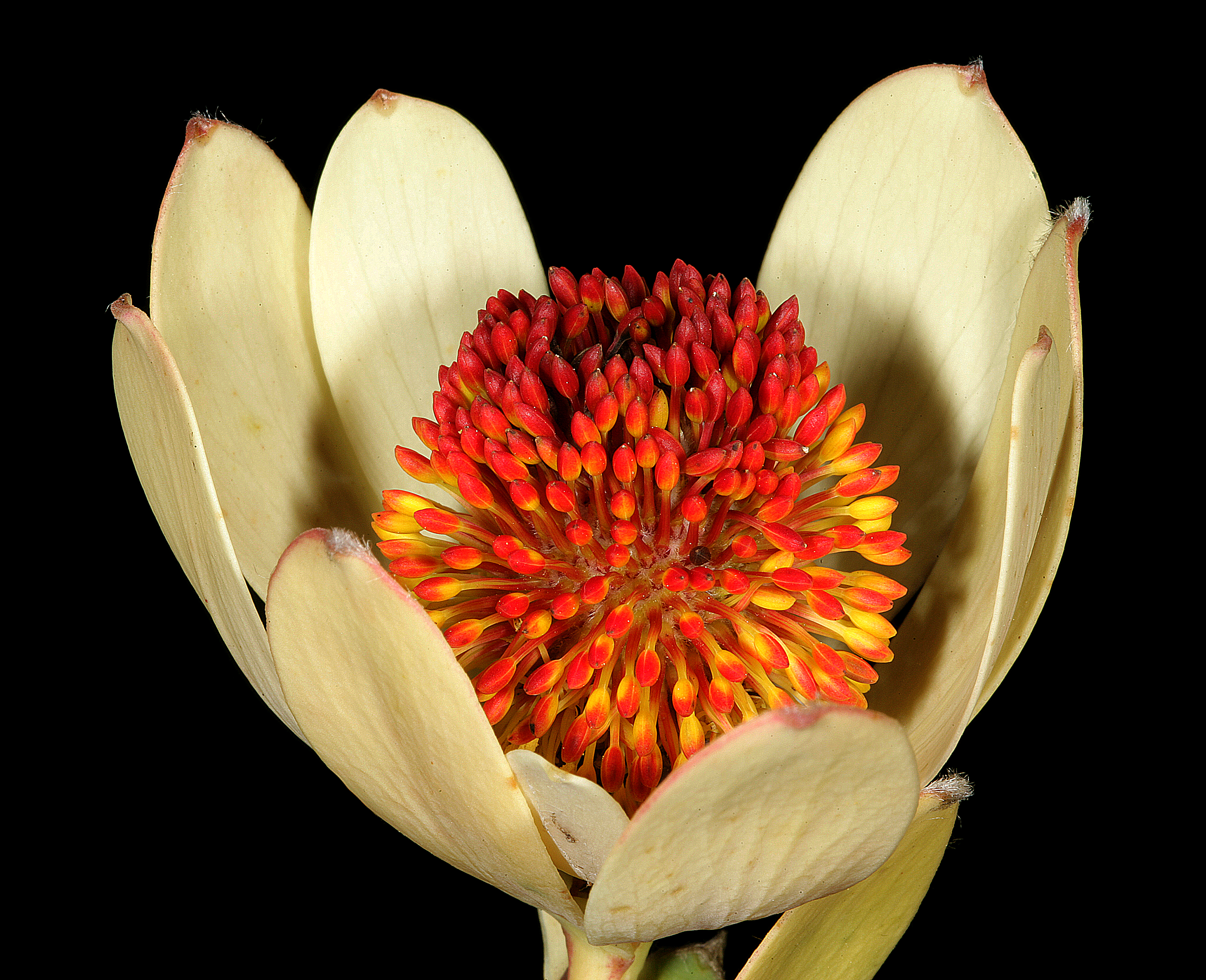

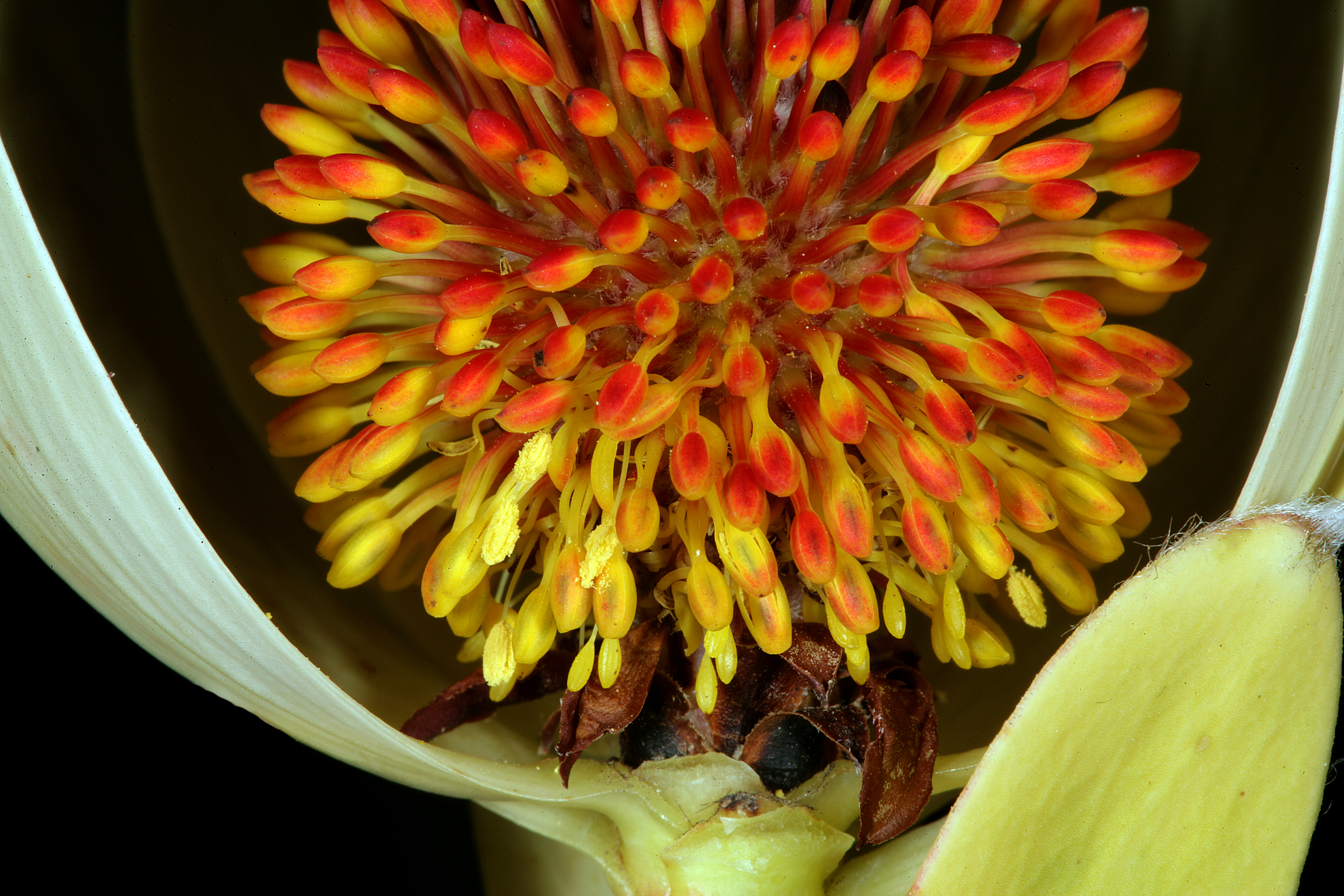

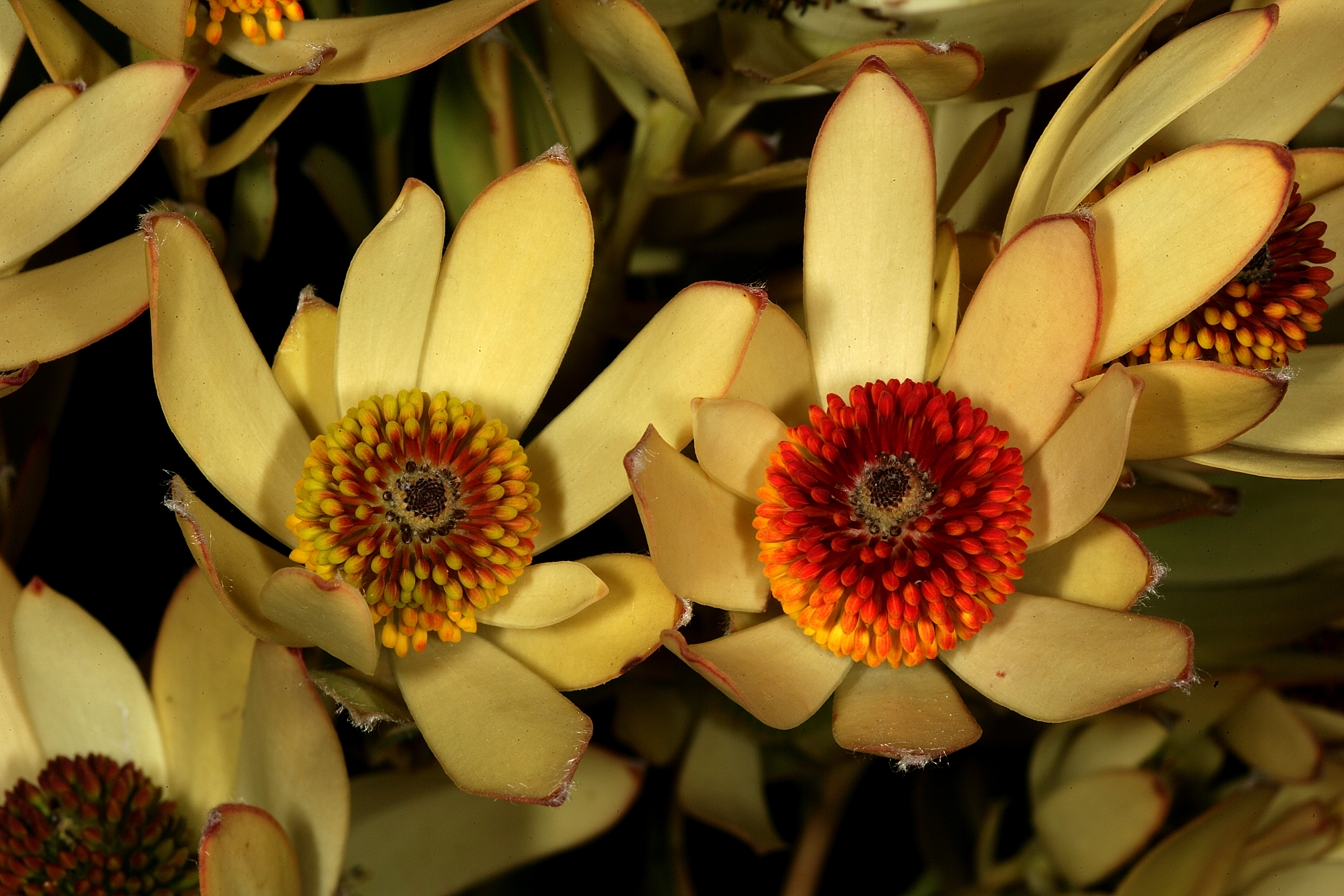

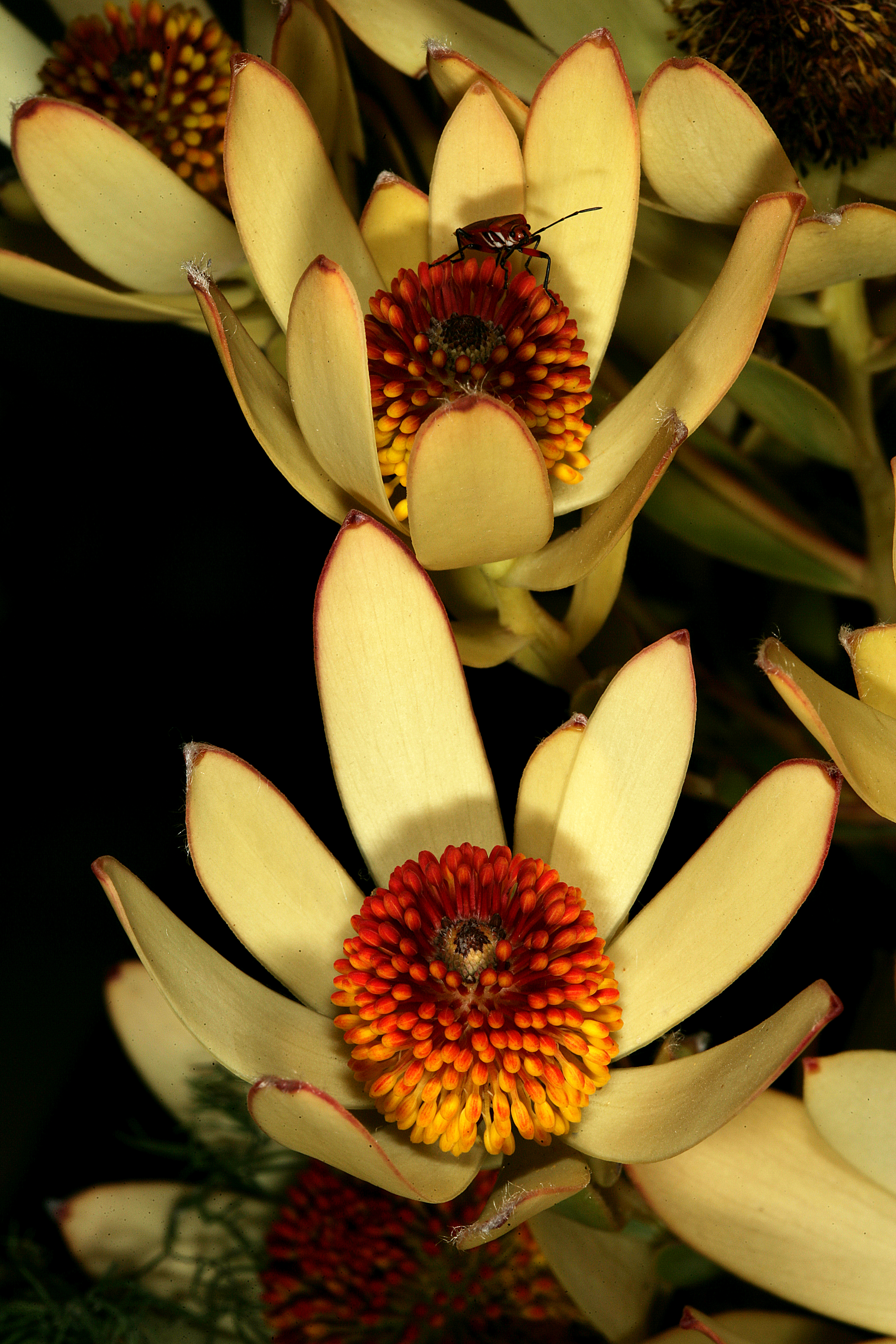

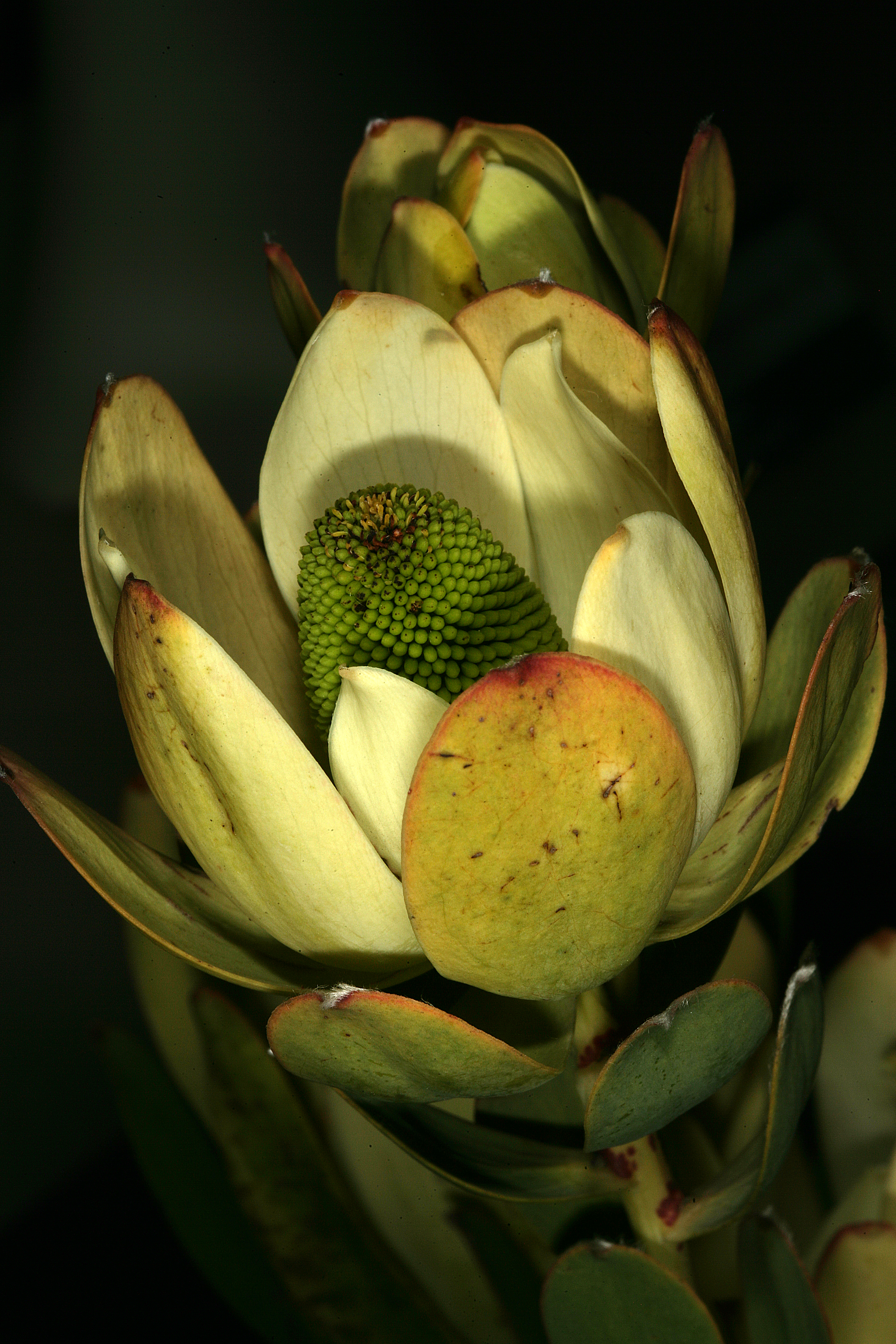

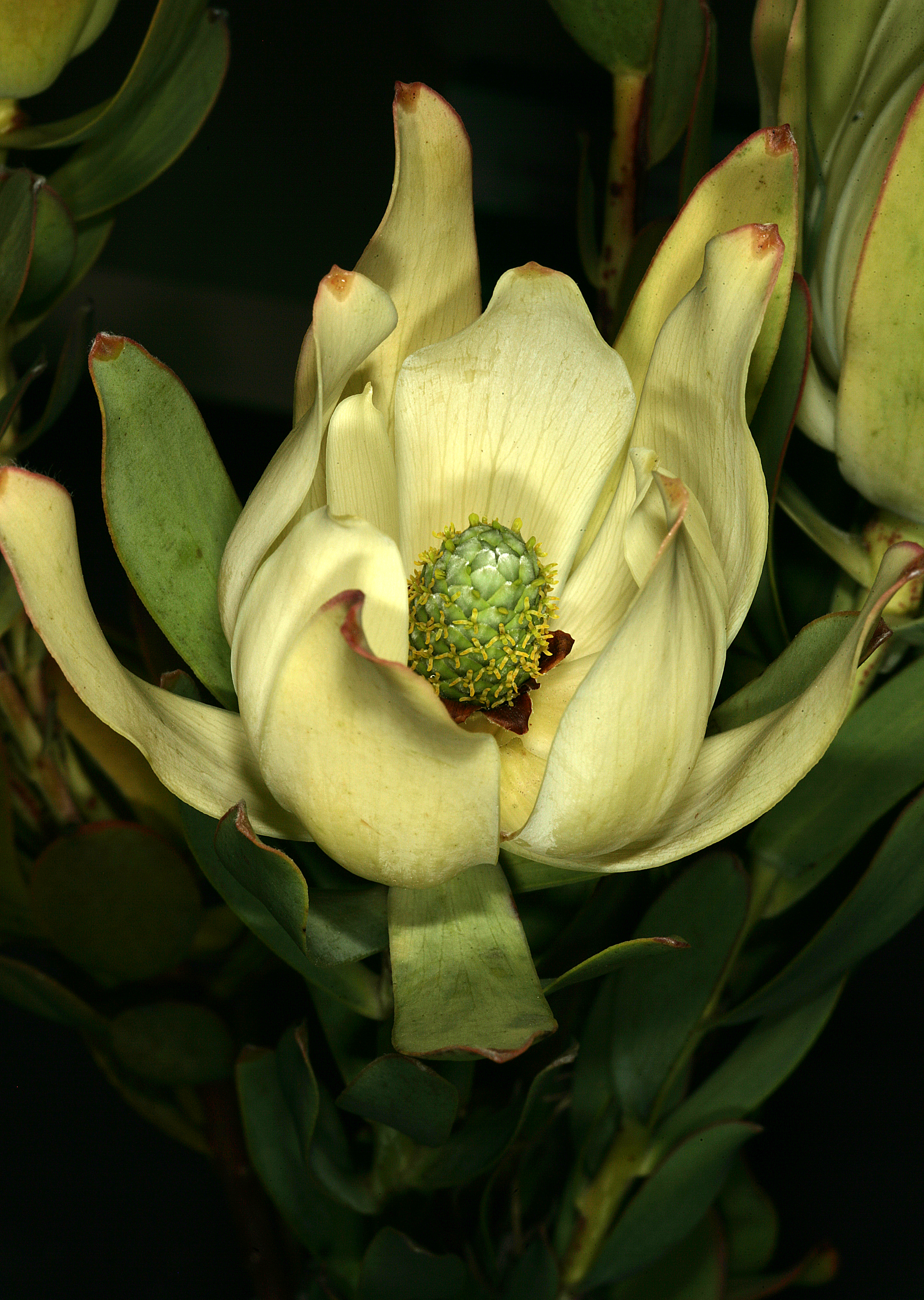

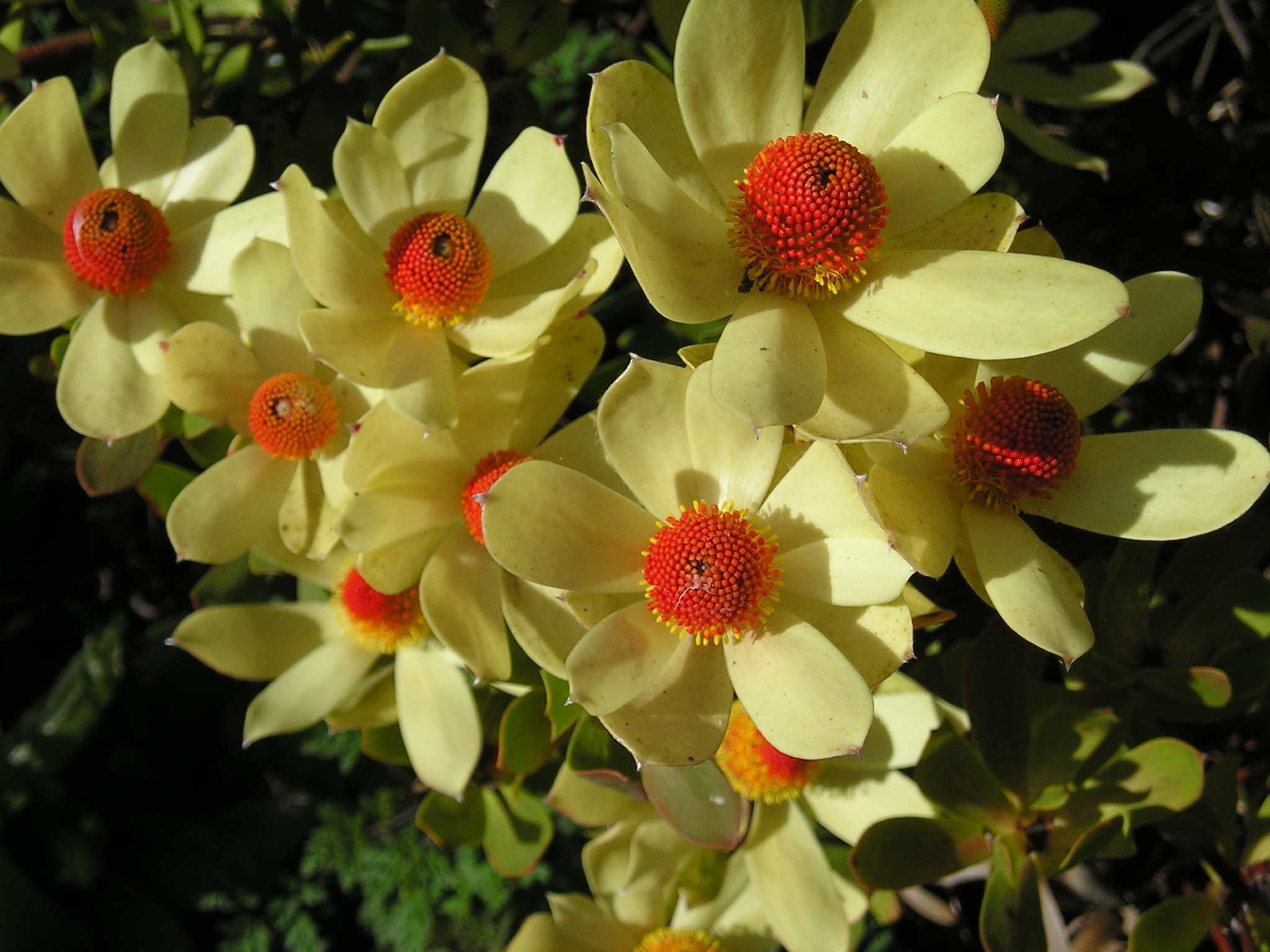
