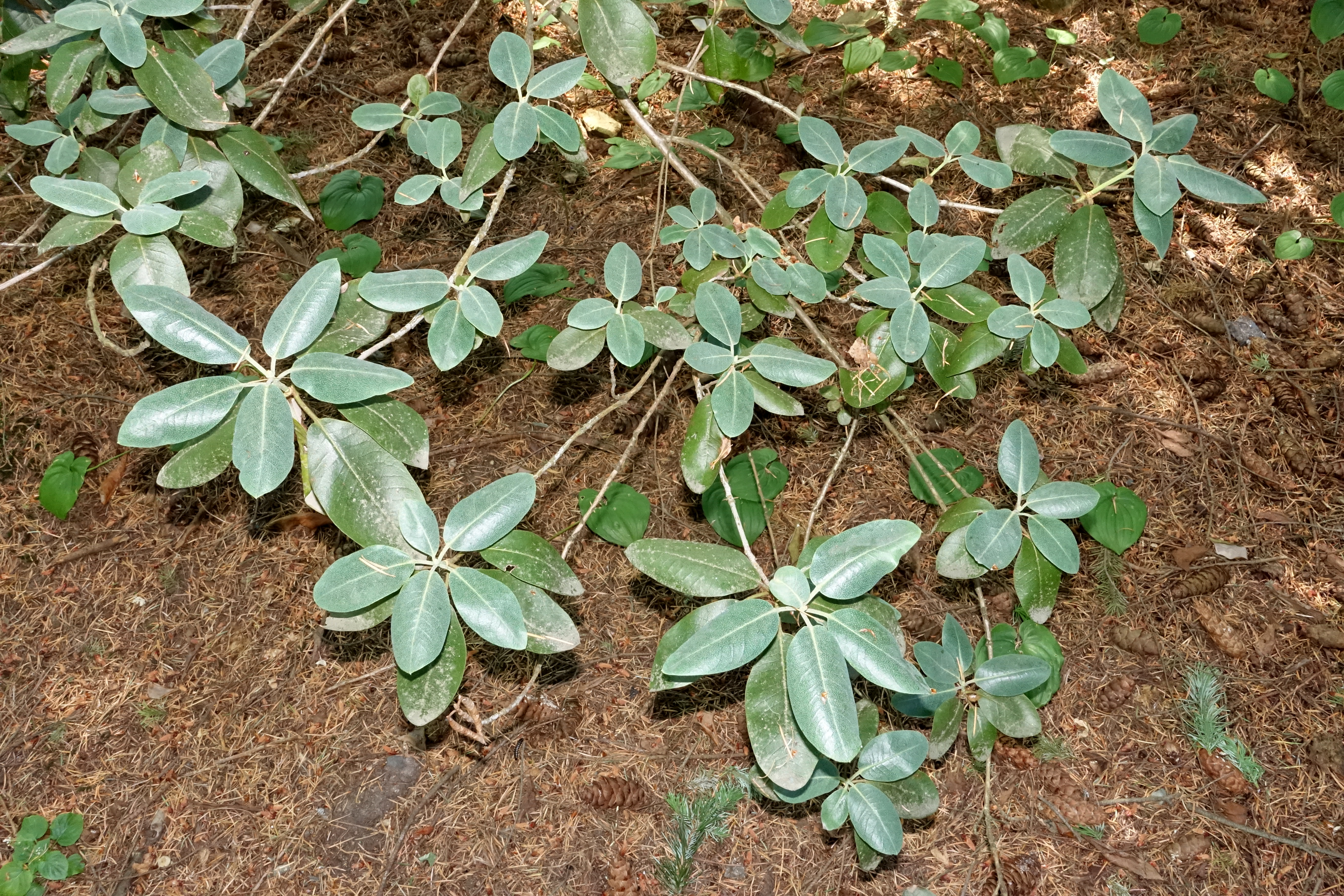

Scientific classification
- Kingdom: Plantae
- Clade: Tracheophytes
- Clade: Angiosperms
- Clade: Eudicots
- Clade: Asterids
- Order: Ericales
- Family: Ericaceae
- Genus: Rhododendron
- Species: R. xanthocodon

Binomial name
- Rhododendron xanthocodon Hutch.

= Rhododendron xanthocodon =

Species of plant

Rhododendron xanthocodon (黄铃杜鹃) is a rhododendron species native to northeastern India, Tibet, and Bhutan, where it grows at altitudes of 2,900–4,100 m (9,500–13,500 ft). It is an evergreen shrub or small tree that grows to 1.5–7.5 m (4.9–24.6 ft) in height, with leathery leaves that are elliptic or oblong-elliptic, and 3–7.5 × 1.5–4.5 cm in size. The flowers are creamy yellow.

== Synonyms ==
- Rhododendron cinnabarinum var. purpurellum Cowan
- Rhododendron cinnabarinum subsp. xanthocodon (Hutch.) Cullen
- Rhododendron concatenans Hutch.
