= Bessey system =

System of plant classification

A system of plant taxonomy, the Bessey system was published by Charles Bessey in 1915.

== Description ==
Bessey based his system on the tradition of de Candolle, Bentham and Hooker and Hallier. He was also influenced by Darwin and Wallace. He taught that taxonomy must be based on evolutionary principles. Like Wettstein he placed the Ranales at the origin of Angiospermae.

He considered Spermatophyta as having a polyphyletic origin, being made up of three different phyla, of which he only treated Anthophyta (syn.: Angiosperms). In that he used the same names for the subclasses of both monocotyledons and dicotyledons, this is contrary to contemporary rules on plant nomenclature that require names to be unique. However Bessey actually used a qualifying hyphenation (Alternifoliae-Strobiloideae and Oppositifoliae-Strobiloideae), a distinction not always recognised in reference to this scheme. With some modifications, most modern classifications - for example, those of Cronquist (1981, 1983, 1988), Takhtajan (1969, 1980, 1983, 1991), Stebbins (1974), R. Dahlgren (1975, 1980, 1983; R. Dahlgren et al. 1981; R. Dahlgren and F. N. Rasmussen 1983; R. Dahlgren and K. Bremer 1985; G. Dahlgren 1989), and Thorne (1976, 1981, 1983, 1992) - follow the Bessey tradition.

== Summary ==
- phylum Angiospermae
  1 classis Alternifoliae syn.:Monocotyledoneae
  2 classis Oppositifoliae syn.: Dicotyledoneae

== Alternifoliae ==
- 1 classis Alternifoliae syn.:Monocotyledoneae
  1 subclassis Alternifoliae-Strobiloideae
  ordo Alismatales
  Alismataceae
  Butomaceae
  Triuridaceae
  Scheuchzeriaceae
  Typhaceae
  Sparganiaceae
  Pandanaceae
  Aponogetonaceae
  Potamogetonaceae
  ordo Liliales
  Liliaceae
  Stemonaceae
  Pontederiaceae
  Cyanastraceae
  Philydraceae
  Commelinaceae
  Xyridaceae
  Mayacaceae
  Juncaceae
  Eriocaulaceae as Eriocaulonaceae [sic]
  Thurniaceae
  Rapateaceae
  Najadaceae as Naiadaceae [sic]
  ordo Arales
  Cyclanthaceae
  Araceae
  Lemnaceae
  ordo Palmales
  Palmae as Palmaceae [sic]
  ordo Graminales
  Restionaceae
  Centrolepidaceae
  Flagellariaceae
  Cyperaceae
  Poaceae
  2 subclassis Cotyloideae
  ordo Hydrales
  Vallisneriaceae syn.: Hydrocharitaceae
  ordo Iridales
  Amaryllidaceae
  Haemodoraceae
  Iridaceae
  Velloziaceae
  Taccaceae
  Dioscoreaceae
  Bromeliaceae
  Musaceae
  Zingiberaceae
  Cannaceae
  Marantaceae
  ordo Orchidales
  Burmanniaceae
  Orchidaceae

== Oppositifoliae ==
- 2 classis Oppositifoliae syn.: Dicotyledoneae
  1 subclassis Oppositifoliae-Strobiloideae
  1 superordo Apopetalae-Polycarpellatae
  ordo Ranales
  Magnoliaceae
  Calycanthaceae
  Monimiaceae
  Cercidiphyllaceae
  Trochodendraceae
  Leitneriaceae
  Annonaceae as Anonaceae [sic]
  Lactoridaceae
  Gomortegaceae
  Myristicaceae
  Saururaceae
  Piperaceae
  Lacistemaceae
  Chloranthaceae
  Ranunculaceae
  Lardizabalaceae
  Berberidaceae
  Menispermaceae
  Lauraceae
  Nelumbonaceae as Nelumbaceae [sic]
  Cabombaceae
  Ceratophyllaceae
  Dilleniaceae
  Winteraceae as Winteranaceae [sic]
  ordo Malvales
  Sterculiaceae
  Malvaceae
  Bombacaceae as Bombaceae [sic]
  Scytopetalaceae
  Chlaenaceae syn.: Sarcolaenaceae
  Gonystylaceae
  Tiliaceae
  Elaeocarpaceae
  Balanopaceae as Balanopsidaceae [sic]
  Ulmaceae
  Moraceae
  Urticaceae
  ordo Sarraceniales
  Sarraceniaceae
  Nepenthaceae
  ordo Geraniales
  Geraniaceae
  Oxalidaceae
  Tropaeolaceae
  Balsaminaceae
  Limnanthaceae
  Linaceae
  Humiriaceae
  Rutaceae
  Simaroubaceae as Simarubaceae [sic]
  Burseraceae
  Meliaceae
  Malpighiaceae
  Trigoniaceae
  Vochysiaceae
  Polygalaceae
  Tremandraceae
  Dichapetalaceae
  Euphorbiaceae
  Callitrichaceae
  ordo Guttiferales
  Theaceae
  Cistaceae
  Guttiferae as Guttiferaceae [sic]
  Eucryphiaceae
  Ochnaceae
  Dipterocarpaceae
  Caryocaraceae
  Quiinaceae
  Marcgraviaceae
  Flacourtiaceae
  Bixaceae
  Cochlospermaceae
  Violaceae
  Malesherbiaceae
  Turneraceae
  Passifloraceae
  Achariaceae
  Caricaceae
  Stachyuraceae
  Koeberliniaceae
  ordo Rhoeadales
  Papaveraceae
  Tovariaceae
  Nymphaeaceae
  Moringaceae
  Resedaceae
  Capparaceae as Capparidaceae [sic]
  Brassicaceae
  ordo Caryophyllales
  Caryophyllaceae
  Elatinaceae
  Portulacaceae
  Aizoaceae
  Frankeniaceae
  Tamaricaceae
  Salicaceae
  Podostemaceae as Podostemonaceae [sic]
  Hydrostachyaceae as Hydrostachydaceae [sic]
  Phytolaccaceae
  Basellaceae
  Amaranthaceae
  Chenopodiaceae
  Polygonaceae
  Nyctaginaceae
  Cynocrambaceae syn.: Theligonaceae
  Bataceae as Batidaceae [sic]
  2 superordo Sympetalae-Polycarpellatae
  ordo Ebenales
  Sapotaceae
  Ebenaceae
  Symplocaceae
  Styracaceae
  Fouquieriaceae
  ordo Ericales
  Clethraceae
  Ericaceae
  Epacridaceae
  Diapensiaceae
  Pyrolaceae
  Lennoaceae
  ordo Primulales
  Primulaceae
  Plantaginaceae
  Plumbaginaceae
  Myrsinaceae
  Theophrastaceae
  3 superordo Sympetalae-Dicarpellatae
  ordo Gentianales
  Oleaceae
  Salvadoraceae
  Loganiaceae
  Gentianaceae
  Apocynaceae
  Asclepiadaceae
  ordo Polemoniales
  Polemoniaceae
  Convolvulaceae
  Hydrophyllaceae
  Boraginaceae as Borraginaceae
  Nolanaceae
  Solanaceae
  ordo Scrophulariales
  2 subclassis Cotyloideae
  1 superordo Apopetalae
  ordo Rosales
  Rosaceae
  Malaceae
  Prunaceae
  Crossosomataceae
  Connaraceae
  Mimosaceae
  Cassiaceae
  Fabaceae
  Saxifragaceae
  Hydrangeaceae
  Grossulariaceae
  Crassulaceae
  Droseraceae
  Cephalotaceae
  Pittosporaceae
  Brunelliaceae
  Cunoniaceae
  Myrothamnaceae
  Bruniaceae
  Hamamelidaceae
  Casuarinaceae
  Eucommiaceae
  Platanaceae
  ordo Myrtales
  Lythraceae
  Sonneratiaceae
  Punicaceae
  Lecythidaceae
  Melastomataceae
  Myrtaceae
  Combretaceae
  Rhizophoraceae
  Oenotheraceae
  Halorrhagidaceae
  Hippuridaceae
  Cynomoriaceae
  Aristolochiaceae
  Rafflesiaceae
  Hydnoraceae
  ordo Loasales
  Loasaceae
  Cucurbitaceae
  Begoniaceae
  Datiscaceae
  Ancistrocladaceae
  ordo Cactales
  Cactaceae
  ordo Celastrales
  Rhamnaceae
  Vitaceae
  Celastraceae
  Buxaceae
  Aquifoliaceae
  Cyrillaceae
  Pentaphylacaceae
  Corynocarpaceae
  Hippocrateaceae
  Stackhousiaceae
  Staphyleaceae
  Geissolomataceae
  Penaeaceae
  Oliniaceae
  Thymelaeaceae
  Hernandiaceae
  Elaeagnaceae
  Myzodendraceae
  Santalaceae
  Opiliaceae
  Grubbiaceae
  Olacaceae
  Loranthaceae
  Balanophoraceae
  ordo Sapindales
  Sapindaceae
  Hippocastanaceae
  Aceraceae
  Sabiaceae
  Icacinaceae
  Melianthaceae
  Empetraceae
  Coriariaceae
  Anacardiaceae
  Juglandaceae
  Betulaceae
  Fagaceae
  Myricaceae
  Julianaceae
  Proteaceae
  ordo Apiales as Umbellales
  Araliaceae
  Apiaceae
  Cornaceae
  2 superordo Sympetalae
  ordo Rubiales
  Rubiaceae
  Caprifoliaceae
  Adoxaceae
  Valerianaceae
  Dipsacaceae
  ordo Campanulales
  Campanulaceae
  Goodeniaceae
  Stylidiaceae
  Calyceraceae
  ordo Asterales
  Helianthaceae
  Ambrosiaceae
  Heleniaceae
  Arctotidaceae
  Calendulaceae
  Inulaceae
  Asteraceae
  Vernoniaceae
  Eupatoriaceae
  Anthemidaceae
  Senecionidaceae
  Carduaceae
  Mutisiaceae
  Lactucaceae

== Bibliography ==
- Bessey, Charles E. (1915). "The phylogenetic taxonomy of flowering plants". Annals of the Missouri Botanical Garden. 2 (1/2): 109–164. doi:10.2307/2990030. JSTOR 2990030. (also at "Botanicus.org". Missouri Botanical Garden.)
- Rodolphe Spichiger, Mathieu Perret, ed. (2004) [2002]. Botanique systématique des plantes à fleurs: une approche phylogénétique nouvelle des angiospermes des régions tempérées et tropicales [Systematic Botany of Flowering Plants]. Lausanne: Science Publishers. ISBN 1578083737.
- Singh, Gurcharan (2004). Plant Systematics: An Integrated Approach. Science Publishers. ISBN 1-57808-351-6.
- G. H. M. Lawrence (1951). Taxonomy of vascular plants.
