= Ranales =

The Ranales are an obsolete taxon of the Dicotyledons, with rank of order typified by Ranunculus (Ranunculaceae).

== Description ==
The Ranunculaceae were included directly in the Thalamiflorae by de Candolle (1819-1824) as an order within that subclass. They were paraphyletic and considered a very primitive group with a key position in angiosperm phylogeny. In the Bentham and Hooker classification they were characterised as having "stamens usually many, carpels free, endosperm conspicuous, embryo small". The term may be qualified by using its broader circumscription (sensu lato), i.e Ranales s.l..

In the Bentham and Hooker system (1862-1883), the Ranales were the first cohort of the Thalamiflorae with eight families:

- I. RANUNCULACEÆ (Bleeding hearts, Buttercups, Baneberry, Nigellas, and Clematis)
  II. DILLENIACEÆ (Guinea flowers)
  III. CALYCANTHACEÆ (Sweetshrubs, Winter flowers, and Ribbonwoods)
  IV. MAGNOLIACEÆ (Magnolias and Tulip trees)
  V. ANONACEÆ [sic] (Sugar apples and Pawpaw)
  VI. MENISPERMACEÆ (Moonseeds)
  VII. BERBERIDEÆ (Barberries and mayapples)
  VIII. NYMPHÆACEÆ (Water lilies)

Bessey (1915) made it a much larger entity within the Strobiloideae with twenty-four families. Later, Hutchinson (1959) circumscribed the Ranales more narrowly with only four families (Ranunculaceae, Cabombaceae, Ceratophyllaceae, Nymphaeaceae) within the Archychlamydeae. Melchior (1964) preferred the term Ranunculales to include the Ranunculaceae within Archychlamydeae, the term which is still in use including seven families but little overlap with Hutchinson. Cronquist (1968-1981), one of the more influential twentieth century classifications had eight families and placed the Ranunculales in the larger Magnoliidae. Ranunculales has been used by most subsequent systems with the exception of Thorne (1992), with Berberidales, but with widely varying numbers of families.

The current APG system uses Ranunculales in the Eudicot clade with seven families.
