= Georg Klebs =

German botanist

Georg Albrecht Klebs
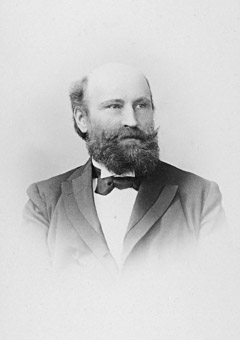
- Georg Albrecht Klebs
- Born: 23 October 1857; Neidenburg, Province of Prussia, Kingdom of Prussia
- Died: 15 October 1918 (aged 60); Heidelberg, German Empire
- Education: University of Königsberg
- Known for: Developmental physiology
- Awards: Croonian Lecture
- Scientific career
- Fields: Botanist
- Workplaces: University of Basel; University of Halle; University of Heidelberg
- Doctoral advisor: Julius von Sachs
- Doctoral students: Ernst Bessey

Georg Albrecht Klebs (23 October 1857 – 15 October 1918) was a German botanist from Neidenburg (Nidzica), Prussia. His wife was the Egyptologist Luise Klebs. His brother was the historian Elimar Klebs.

== Life ==
Klebs studied chemistry, philosophy, and art history at the University of Königsberg and became an assistant to Anton de Bary at the University of Strassburg. After his military service, Klebs became an assistant to Julius Sachs at the University of Würzburg and Wilhelm Pfeffer at the University of Tübingen. He became a professor at the University of Basel in 1887, the University of Halle in 1898, and the University of Heidelberg in 1907, where he founded today's botanical garden, the Botanischer Garten der Universität Heidelberg.

Klebs received a Croonian Lectureship in 1910. From 1910 to 1912 he travelled through Siberia, Japan, Java, India, the Caucasus, and southern Russia. In 1913 he participated in an expedition to Egypt. He died in Heidelberg from influenza during the 1918 influenza pandemic.

== Publications ==
- Zur Entwicklungsphysiologie der Farnprothaillen, 3 Bände, 1917
- Beiträge zur Physiologie der Pflanzenzelle, 1888
- Die Bedingungen der Fortpflanzung bei einigen Algen und Pilzen, 1896, 2. Auflage 1928
- Willkürliche Entwicklungsänderungen bei Pflanzen – Ein Beitrag zur Physiologie der Entwicklung, 1903

== References and external links ==
- Biography (in German)
