= Personales =

Extinct order of flowering plants

Personales was an order of dicotyledons in the Hutchinson system.

In the current APG system these families generally belong to the order Lamiales in the Astrid clade.

== Families ==
It consisted of the following families:

- Acanthaceae
- Bignoniaceae
- Columelliaceae
- Gesneriaceae
- Lentibulariaceae
- Orobanchaceae
- Pedaliaceae
- Scrophulariaceae

== See also ==
- Lamiales topics
