= Strobiloideae =

The Strobiloideae are an obsolete taxonomic name, a subclass of both Monocotyledons and Dicotyledons proposed by Charles Bessey in 1915 in his taxonomic classification of plants. In this sense by not being unique it breaks the rules of botanical nomenclature as currently used, however Bessey actually used a qualifying hyphenation (Alternifoliae-Strobiloideae and Oppositifoliae-Strobiloideae), a distinction not always recognised in reference to this scheme.

Bessey believed in the strobiloid theory of plant evolution that postulated that the Angiospermae (flowering plants) originated from Cycadophyta, and that flowers originated from a primitive vegetative shoot that developed into a structure with perianth, stamens and carpels. From this arose two lines, the Strobiloideae (or Ranalian line) with connation of like parts and the Cotyloideae (or Rosalian line) with connation of unlike parts, which he assigned as the two subclasses of monocots (called Alternifoliae by Bessey), but also of dicots (called Oppositifoliae by Bessey).

== Subdivisions ==
The Alternifoliae Strobiloideae had five orders, arranged as follows:

- 1 subclassis Strobiloideae
  ordo Alismatales
  ordo Liliales
  ordo Arales
  ordo Palmales
  ordo Graminales

of these, the Alismatales were considered the most primitive.

while the Oppositifoliae Strobiloideae had fourteen arranged in three superorders:

- 2 classis Oppositifoliae
  1 superordo Apopetalae-Polycarpellatae
  2 superordo Sympetalae-Polycarpellatae
  3 superordo Sympetalae-Dicarpellatae

== Sources ==
- Singh, Gurcharan (2004). Plant Systematics: An Integrated Approach. Science Publishers. pp. 10–29. ISBN 1-57808-351-6.
