= Luise Klebs =

German Egyptologist

- Born: Luise Charlotte Therese von Sigwart; June 13, 1865; Tübingen, Kingdom of Württemberg
- Died: May 24, 1931 (aged 65); Lugano, Switzerland
- Occupation: Egyptologist
- Known for: Die Reliefs … (three-volume scene-indexed catalogues of Egyptian reliefs and paintings)
- Spouse: Georg Albrecht Klebs (m. 1888)
- Parent: Christoph von Sigwart (father)

Luise Klebs (13 June 1865 – 24 May 1931) was a German Egyptologist best known for a three-volume, scene-indexed corpus of ancient Egyptian reliefs and wall paintings covering the Old, Middle and New Kingdoms. Compiled largely at the Aegyptologisches Institut of the University of Heidelberg, her handbooks became widely used reference tools for comparative study of iconography, while the New Kingdom volume appeared posthumously in 1934.

== Life ==
Klebs was born in Tübingen as Luise Charlotte Therese von Sigwart, daughter of the philosopher and logician Christoph von Sigwart. She married the botanist Georg Albrecht Klebs in Tübingen on 20 March 1888 and subsequently followed his appointments to Basel, Halle and (from 1907) Heidelberg.

After completing the manuscript for the New Kingdom volume in early 1931, Klebs left Heidelberg for a period of rest abroad. She fell ill in Switzerland and died on Pentecost Sunday, 24 May 1931, in Lugano.

== Career and works ==
Klebs worked for many years as an independent scholar associated with the Aegyptologisches Institut (University of Heidelberg). There she compiled extensive note files and indices of figural scenes and technical motifs from tomb and temple decoration, collating material from publications and museum collections. The preface to her posthumous volume states that she left the manuscript “fully press-ready” after “years of tireless work” at the institute and describes the series as “a hand tool long since become indispensable.”

Her project issued as Material zur ägyptischen Kultur-/Kunstgeschichte was arranged thematically by activities (e.g., agriculture, gardening, herding, hunting and fishing, kitchen, crafts, shipbuilding, navigation, leisure) with comprehensive literature lists and registers. A planned companion volume on “the life of the elite” was noted but never appeared; at the time of her death, Agnes Würz was preparing that fourth, concluding volume from Klebs’s card files.

== Legacy ==
Klebs’s volumes (often cited simply as “Klebs, Reliefs”) continued to be reprinted and used as working tools by Egyptologists in the later 20th century. For example, the Deutsche Nationalbibliothek lists reprints of the 1915 and 1922 volumes. Her thematic arrangement is still referenced in modern scholarship dealing with daily-life scenes and craft processes.

== Selected bibliography ==
- Klebs, Luise (1915). Die Reliefs des alten Reiches (2980–2475 v. Chr.): Material zur ägyptischen Kulturgeschichte (in German). Heidelberg: Carl Winters Universitätsbuchhandlung.
- Klebs, Luise (1922). Die Reliefs und Malereien des mittleren Reiches (VII.–XVII. Dynastie, ca. 2475–1580 v. Chr.): Material zur ägyptischen Kulturgeschichte (in German). Heidelberg: Carl Winters Universitätsbuchhandlung.
- Klebs, Luise (1934). Die Reliefs und Malereien des neuen Reiches (XVIII.–XX. Dynastie, ca. 1580–1100 v. Chr.): Material zur ägyptischen Kunstgeschichte. Teil 1: Szenen aus dem Leben des Volkes (in German). Heidelberg: Carl Winters Universitätsbuchhandlung. doi:10.11588/diglit.73394.
