= Isidodendron =

Scientific classification
- Kingdom: Plantae
- Clade: Tracheophytes
- Clade: Angiosperms
- Clade: Eudicots
- Clade: Rosids
- Order: Malpighiales
- Family: Trigoniaceae
- Genus: Isidodendron; Fern.Alonso, Pérez-Zab. & Idarraga
- Species: I. tripterocarpum

Binomial name
- Isidodendron tripterocarpum Fern.Alonso, Pérez-Zab. & Idarraga

Genus of plants

Isidodendron is a monotypic genus of flowering plants belonging to the family Trigoniaceae. The only species is Isidodendron tripterocarpum.

It is native to Colombia.

The genus name of Isidodendron is in honour of Isidoro Cabrera-Rodriguez (b. 1922), a Colombian dendrologist and plant collector at the herbarium of the University of Valle, with the prefix of dendron the Greek word which refers to tree. The Latin specific epithet of tripterocarpum refers to 'tri' meaning 3, Greek 'pterón' meaning wing or feather and 'carp' meaning fruit from the Greek word of καρπός (karpós).

Both genus and species were first described and published in Revista Acad. Colomb. Ci. Exact. Vol.24 on page 348 in 2000.
