= Ernst Bessey =

American mycologist, botanist and plant pathologist

Ernst Athearn Bessey
- Born: February 20, 1877; Ames, Iowa
- Died: July 17, 1957 (aged 80)
- Citizenship: United States
- Education: University of Nebraska, University of Halle
- Scientific career
- Fields: Mycology and Botany
- Doctoral advisor: Georg Klebs
- Author abbrev. (botany): E.A.Bessey

Ernst Athearn Bessey (February 20, 1877 – July 17, 1957) was an American mycologist, botanist and plant pathologist who served as professor of mycology and botany and dean of the graduate school at Michigan State University. He was the son of another famous botanist, Charles Edwin Bessey.

Bessey was born in Ames, Iowa, where his father was professor of botany at Iowa Agricultural College. In 1884 he moved to Lincoln, Nebraska when his father moved to the University of Nebraska. Bessey attended the University of Nebraska, receiving a Bachelor of Arts in 1896, a Bachelor of Science in 1897, and a Master of Arts in 1898. He then moved to Germany where he did his doctoral work at the University of Halle under the supervision of Georg Klebs. After completing his Ph.D. in 1904 he served as an agricultural explorer United States Department of Agriculture visiting Russia, Central Asia and Algeria. After returning to the United States he worked for the USDA and Louisiana State University before moving to Michigan Agricultural College (now Michigan State University) in 1910.

Bessey remained at Michigan State until his retirement in 1946. He served as acting dean of the Division of Applied Science from 1927 to 1930 and dean of the graduate school from 1930 to 1944. He was a founding member of the Mycological Society of America and served as its president in 1941.

Ernst Bessey Hall at Michigan State University is named in his honor.

== See also ==
- List of mycologists
