= Trigoniodendron =

Scientific classification
- Kingdom: Plantae
- Clade: Tracheophytes
- Clade: Angiosperms
- Clade: Eudicots
- Clade: Rosids
- Order: Malpighiales
- Family: Trigoniaceae
- Genus: Trigoniodendron; E.F.Guim. & Miguel

Genus of flowering plants

Trigoniodendron is a genus of flowering plants belonging to the family Trigoniaceae.

Its native range is Southeastern Brazil.

Species:

- Trigoniodendron spiritusanctense E.F.Guim. & Miguel
