= Trigoniastrum =

Scientific classification
- Kingdom: Plantae
- Clade: Tracheophytes
- Clade: Angiosperms
- Clade: Eudicots
- Clade: Rosids
- Order: Malpighiales
- Family: Trigoniaceae
- Genus: Trigoniastrum; Miq.

Genus of flowering plants

Trigoniastrum is a genus of flowering plants belonging to the family Trigoniaceae.

Its native range is Tropical Asia.

Species:

- Trigoniastrum hypoleucum Miq.
