= Stenomeris =

Scientific classification
- Kingdom: Plantae
- Clade: Tracheophytes
- Clade: Angiosperms
- Clade: Monocots
- Order: Dioscoreales
- Family: Dioscoreaceae
- Genus: Stenomeris; Planch.

Synonyms
- Halloschulzia Kuntze

Genus of flowering plants

Stenomeris is a genus of plants in the family Dioscoreaceae. It has two known species, native to Southeast Asia. Older systems such as that of Hutchinson placed Stenomeris as the type genus of the family Stenomeridaceae, order Dioscoreales (Stenomeridaceae J. Agardh, nom. cons.).

- Stenomeris borneensis Oliv. - Borneo, Malaysia, Sumatra, Mindanao
- Stenomeris dioscoreifolia Planch. - Philippines
