= Hutchinsonia barbata =

Scientific classification
- Kingdom: Plantae
- Clade: Tracheophytes
- Clade: Angiosperms
- Clade: Eudicots
- Clade: Asterids
- Order: Gentianales
- Family: Rubiaceae
- Genus: Hutchinsonia
- Species: H. barbata

Binomial name
- Hutchinsonia barbata Robyns

Species of flowering plant

Hutchinsonia barbata is a species of flowering plant in the family Rubiaceae. It is found in Ghana, Ivory Coast, Liberia and Sierra Leone.
