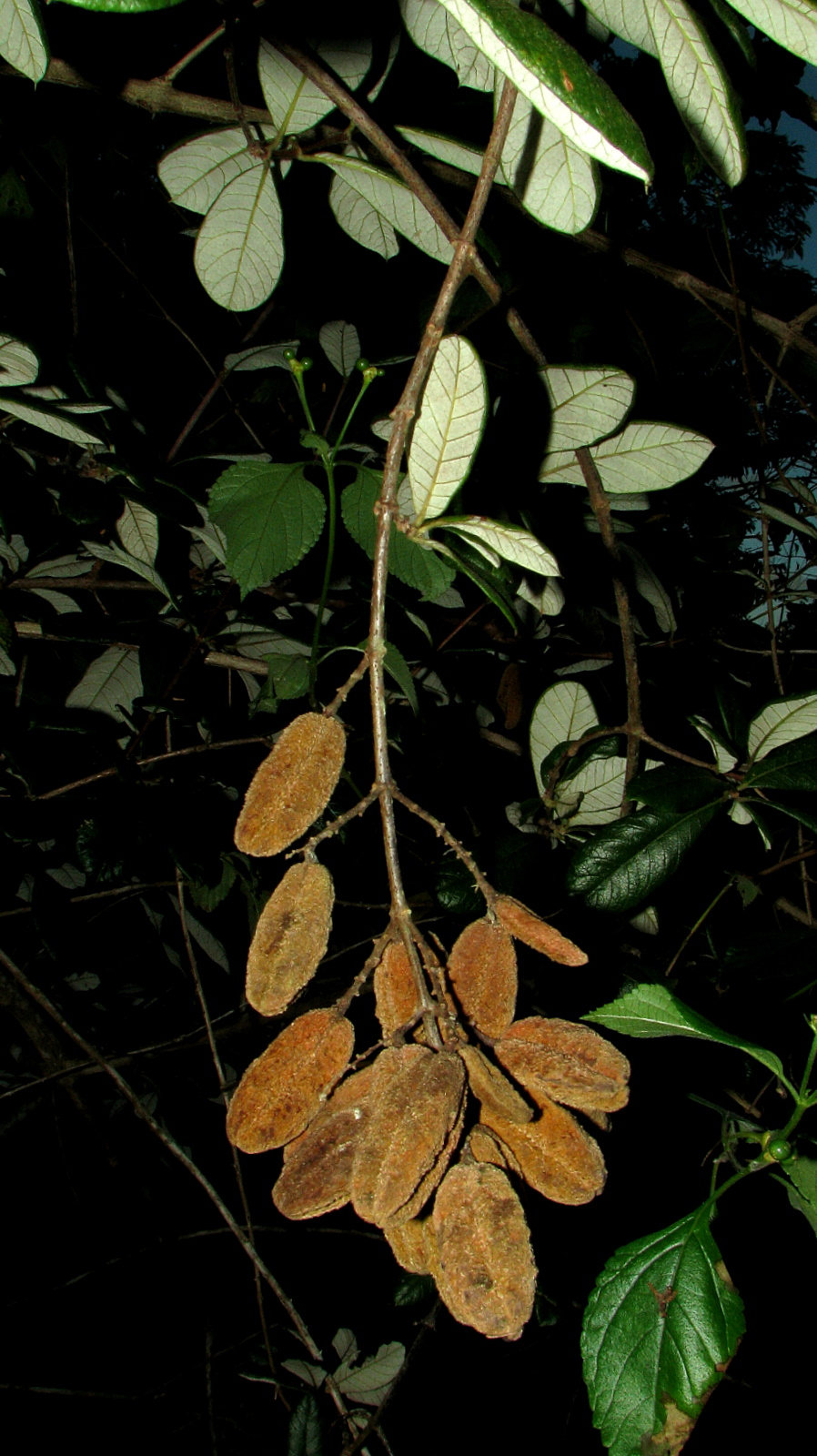

Scientific classification
- Kingdom: Plantae
- Clade: Tracheophytes
- Clade: Angiosperms
- Clade: Eudicots
- Clade: Rosids
- Order: Malpighiales
- Family: Trigoniaceae
- Genus: Trigonia; Aubl. (1775)

Species
- 29; see text

Synonyms
- Hoeffnagelia Neck. (1790), opus utique oppr.; Mainea Vell. (1829); Nuttallia Spreng. (1821), nom. illeg.

= Trigonia (plant) =

Genus of flowering plants

Trigonia is a genus of flowering plants in the family Trigoniaceae. It includes 29 species native to the tropical Americas, ranging from southwestern Mexico to northeastern Argentina.

== Species ==
29 species are accepted.

- Trigonia bahiensis E.F.Guim., Miguel & Fontella
- Trigonia boliviana Warm.
- Trigonia bracteata Lleras
- Trigonia candelabra Lleras
- Trigonia cipoensis Fromm & E.Santos
- Trigonia coppenamensis Stafleu
- Trigonia costanensis Steyerm. & Badillo
- Trigonia ehrendorferi Lleras
- Trigonia eriosperma (Lam.) Fromm & E.Santos
- Trigonia floccosa Rusby
- Trigonia hypoleuca Griseb.
- Trigonia kerrii Lleras
- Trigonia killipii J.F.Macbr.
- Trigonia laevis Aubl.
- Trigonia littoralis Miguel & E.F.Guim.
- Trigonia macrantha Warm.
- Trigonia microcarpa Sagot ex Warm.
- Trigonia nivea Cambess.
- Trigonia paniculata Warm.
- Trigonia prancei Lleras
- Trigonia reticulata Lleras
- Trigonia rotundifolia Lleras
- Trigonia rugosa Benth.
- Trigonia rytidocarpa Casar.
- Trigonia sericea Kunth
- Trigonia spruceana Benth. ex Warm.
- Trigonia subcymosa Benth.
- Trigonia villosa Aubl.
- Trigonia virens J.F.Macbr.
