= Hutchinsonia glabrescens =

Scientific classification
- Kingdom: Plantae
- Clade: Tracheophytes
- Clade: Angiosperms
- Clade: Eudicots
- Clade: Asterids
- Order: Gentianales
- Family: Rubiaceae
- Genus: Hutchinsonia
- Species: H. glabrescens

Binomial name
- Hutchinsonia glabrescens Robyns

Species of flowering plant

Hutchinsonia glabrescens is a species of flowering plant in the family Rubiaceae, commonly known as the coffee family. It is found in Liberia.
