= Hutchinsonia =

Scientific classification
- Kingdom: Plantae
- Clade: Tracheophytes
- Clade: Angiosperms
- Clade: Eudicots
- Clade: Asterids
- Order: Gentianales
- Family: Rubiaceae
- Subfamily: Dialypetalanthoideae
- Tribe: Vanguerieae
- Genus: Hutchinsonia; Robyns

Type species
- Hutchinsonia barbata Robyns

Genus of plants

Hutchinsonia is a genus of flowering plants in the family Rubiaceae. It was described by Walter Robyns in 1928 and was named after his friend and colleague John Hutchinson. It is found in west tropical Africa.

== Species ==
- Hutchinsonia barbata Robyns
- Hutchinsonia glabrescens Robyns
