= Humbertiodendron =

Conservation status
- Endangered (IUCN 3.1)

Scientific classification
- Kingdom: Plantae
- Clade: Tracheophytes
- Clade: Angiosperms
- Clade: Eudicots
- Clade: Rosids
- Order: Malpighiales
- Family: Trigoniaceae
- Genus: Humbertiodendron; Leandri
- Species: H. saboureaui

Binomial name
- Humbertiodendron saboureaui Leandri

Genus of plants

Humbertiodendron is a monotypic genus of flowering plants belonging to the family Trigoniaceae. The only species is Humbertiodendron saboureaui.

It is native to Madagascar.

== Description ==
Humbertiodendron saboureaui is a small to medium-sized tree which grows up to 16 meters tall. It flowers from January to March, and fruits in February and August.

== Range and habitat ==
The species is endemic to coastal Atsinanana region of eastern Madagascar, in areas of Vohibola and Pangalane Nord. There are three known subpopulations. The species' estimated extent of occurrence (EOO) is 18 km^{2}, and the estimated area of occupancy (AOO) is 12 km^{2}.

The species' habitat is humid littoral forest on sand, near the seacoast between 3 and 32 meters elevation.

The species is threatened with habitat loss from deforestation. Its conservation status is assessed as endangered.

== Name ==
The genus name of Humbertiodendron is in honour of Jean-Henri Humbert (1887–1967), a French botanist born in Paris, and later portion of the name refers to dendron the Greek word for "tree". The Latin specific epithet of saboureaui refers to conservator and plant collector Pierre Saboureau. Both genus and species were first described and published by Jacques Désiré Leandri in Compt. Rend. Hebd. Séances Acad. Sci. Vol.229 on page 848 in 1949.
