= Charles Edwin Bessey =

American botanist (1845–1915)

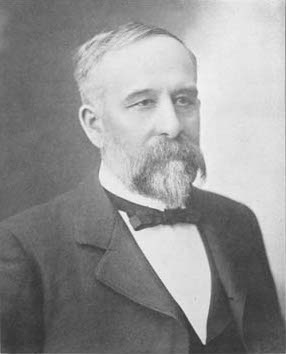
- Born: 21 May 1845; Milton, Ohio
- Died: 25 February 1915 (aged 69)
- Education: Michigan State Agricultural College
- Known for: Bessey system
- Awards: Nebraska Hall of Fame
- Scientific career
- Fields: botanist
- Workplaces: Iowa Agricultural College
- Doctoral advisor: Asa Gray
- Author abbrev. (botany): Bessey

Charles Edwin Bessey (21 May 1845 – 25 February 1915) was an American botanist.

== Biography ==
He was born at Milton, Wayne County, Ohio. He graduated in 1869 at the Michigan State Agricultural College. Bessey also studied at Harvard University under Asa Gray, in 1872 and in 1875–76. He was professor of botany at the Iowa Agricultural College, today known as Iowa State University from 1870 to 1884. In 1884, he was appointed professor of botany at the University of Nebraska and became head dean there in 1909. He also served as chancellor of the University of Nebraska from 1888 to 1891 and again from 1899 to 1900. He served as president of the American Association for the Advancement of Science in 1911. Bessey's son, Ernst Bessey was Professor of Mycology and Botany at Michigan State University. His other two sons, Edward and Carl, specialized in electrical engineering.

== Selected publications ==
=== Books ===
- The Geography of Iowa (Cincinnati, 1878)
- Botany for High Schools and Colleges (New York, 1880)
- revision of McNab's Botany (1881)
- The Essentials of Botany (1884); Bessey, Charles Edwin (1896). 6th edition.
- Elementary Botany (1904)
- Plant Migration Studies (1905)
- Synopsis of Plant Phyla (1907)
- Outlines of Plant Phyla (1909)
- written with others, New Elementary Agriculture (ninth edition, 1911)

=== Articles ===
- Bessey, Charles (September 1897). "Phylogeny and Taxonomy of the Angiosperms". Botanical Gazette. XXIV (3): 145–178. doi:10.1086/327577. PMID 17816268. S2CID 88268600.
- Charles E. Bessey (1915). "The phylogenetic taxonomy of flowering plants". Annals of the Missouri Botanical Garden. 2 (1/2). Missouri Botanical Garden Press: 109–164. Bibcode:1915AnMBG...2..109B. doi:10.2307/2990030. JSTOR 2990030.

== Legacy ==
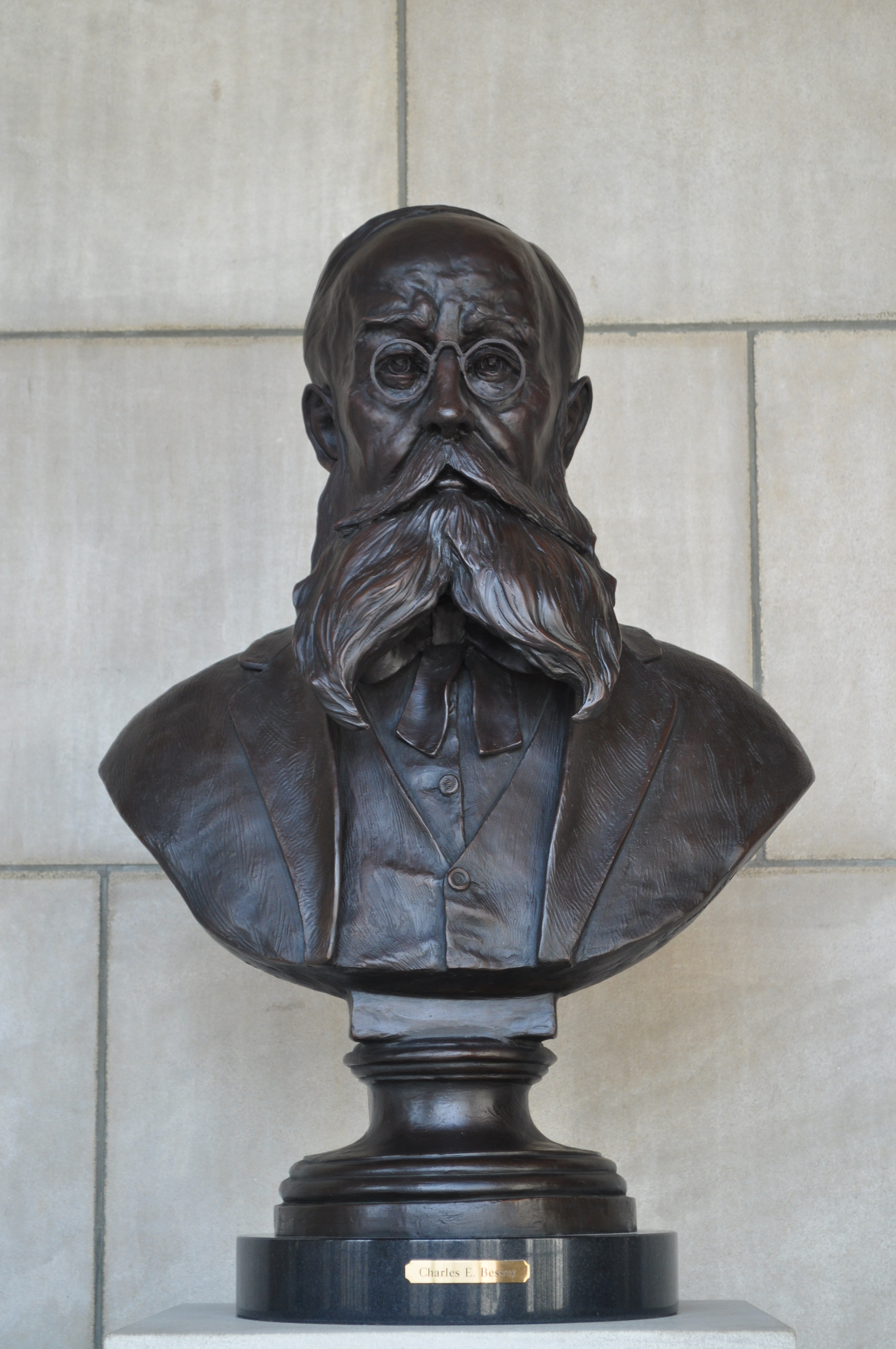
Bust of hedget created by Littleton Alston in 2009 for the Nebraska Hall of Fame.

His arrangement of flowering plants taxa, with focus on the evolutionary divergence of primitive forms, is considered by many as the system most likely to form the basis of a modern, comprehensive taxonomy of the plant kingdom.

In 1967, Iowa State University built a Plant Industry Building, which was named after Bessey. Today the building is used by departments in the biological sciences.

In 2007 he was inducted into the Nebraska Hall of Fame.

== See also ==
- Bessey system, his taxonomic plant system.
- Nebraska National Forest

== Bibliography ==
- Spaulding, P. (1915). "Charles Edwin Bessey". Science. 41 (1055) (published Mar 19, 1915): 420–421. Bibcode:1915Sci....41..420S. doi:10.1126/science.41.1055.420. PMID 17792492.
- Ewan, Joseph (1970–1980). "Bessey, Charles Edwin". Dictionary of Scientific Biography. Vol. 2. New York: Charles Scribner's Sons. pp. 102–104. ISBN 978-0-684-10114-9.
- Overfield, Richard A. Science With Practice: Charles E. Bessey and the Maturing of American Botany. Iowa State University Press Series in the History of Technology and Science. Iowa State Press, 1993. (ISBN 0-8138-1822-2)
- Pool, Raymond J. A brief sketch of the life and work of Charles Edwin Bessey. Botanical Society of America, 1915.
- Tobey, Ronald C. 1981. Saving the Prairies: The Life Cycle of the Founding School of American Plant Ecology, 1895-1955. Berkeley: University of California Press. (ISBN 0-5200-4352-9)
- Wilson, J. G.; Fiske, J., eds. (1891). "Bessey, Charles Edwin" . Appletons' Cyclopædia of American Biography. New York: D. Appleton.
