= Guttiferales =

Order of flowering plants

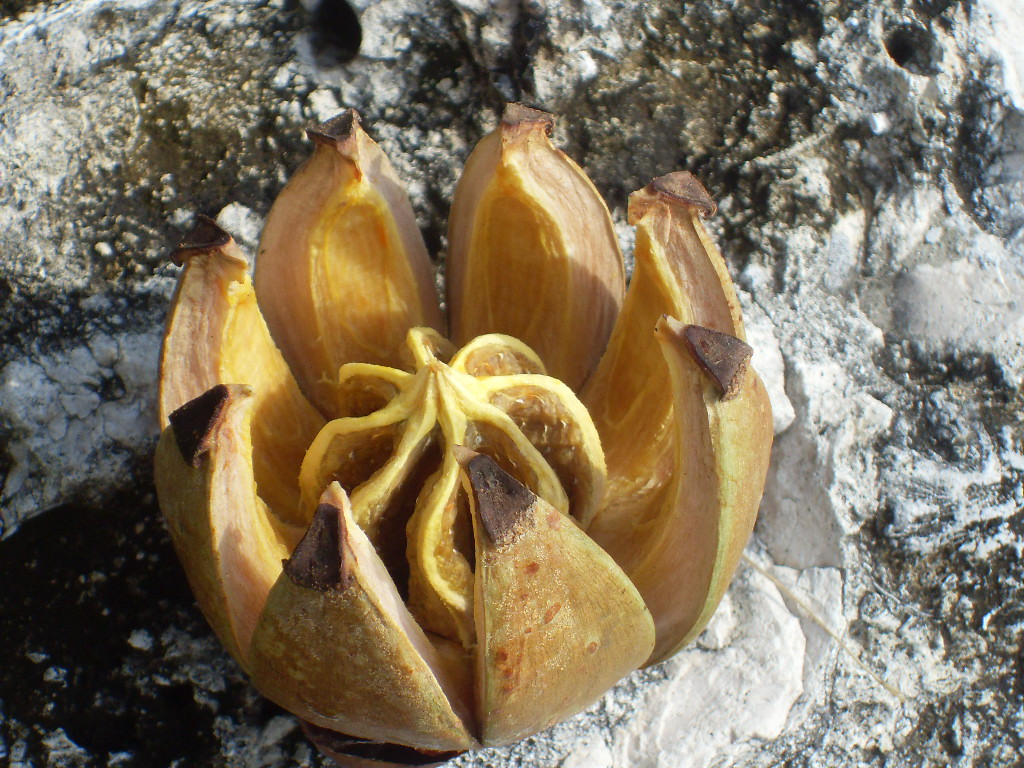
Fruta de Habana

Guttiferales is a descriptive botanical name. It was used in the Bentham & Hooker system, the Wettstein system and Bessey system for an order of flowering plants that included the family Guttiferae. The latter is also a descriptive botanical name and refers to the latex present in these plants.

The order was fairly small in the Bentham & Hooker system:

- order Guttiferales
  family Elatinaceae
  family Hypericaceae
  family Guttiferae
  family Ternstroemiaceae
  family Dipterocarpaceae
  family Chlenaceae

It was much larger in the Wettstein system:

- order Guttiferales
  family Dilleniaceae
  family Actinidiaceae
  family Ochnaceae
  family Strassburgeriaceae
  family Eucryphiaceae
  family Caryocaraceae
  family Marcgraviaceae
  family Quiinaceae
  family Theaceae
  family Guttiferae
  family Dipterocarpaceae

The difference in composition between these two systems, and the fact that these taxa were scattered over various orders in more recent systems such as the Cronquist system and the APG II system suggests it was never a very good unit in the first place. (Note that Bentham & Hooker's Ternstroemiaceae is equivalent to Wettsteins's Theaceae, and that Wettstein's Guttiferae includes Bentham & Hooker's Hypericaceae.)
