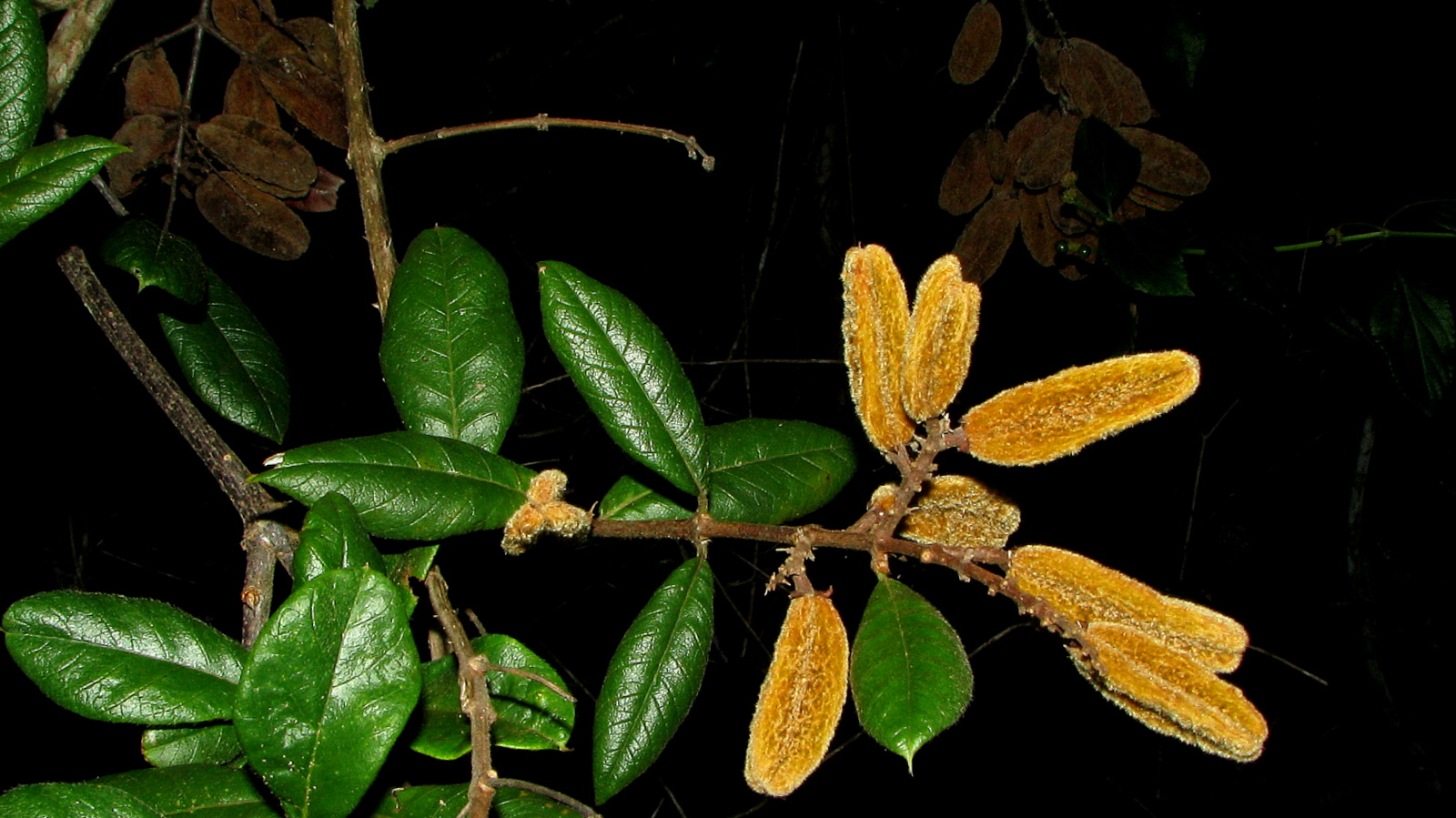
- Trigonia nivea var. pubescens

Scientific classification
- Kingdom: Plantae
- Clade: Tracheophytes
- Clade: Angiosperms
- Clade: Eudicots
- Clade: Rosids
- Order: Malpighiales
- Family: Trigoniaceae; A.Juss.

= Trigoniaceae =

Family of flowering plants

Trigoniaceae is a family of flowering plants, consisting of 28 species in five genera. It is a tropical family found in Madagascar, Southeast Asia, Central and South America.

As of December 2023, Plants of the World Online accepted the following genera:

- Humbertiodendron Leandri
- Isidodendron Fern.Alonso, Pérez-Zab. & Idarraga
- Trigonia Aubl.
- Trigoniastrum Miq.
- Trigoniodendron E.F.Guim. & Miguel
