= John Hutchinson (botanist) =

English botanist and taxonomist (1884–1972)

- Born: 7 April 1884; Wark on Tyne, Northumberland
- Died: 2 September 1972 (aged 88); London
- Known for: Hutchinson system
- Awards: Fellow of the Royal Society (1947); Darwin-Wallace Medal (Silver, 1958); Linnean Medal (1965)
- Scientific career
- Fields: Botany
- Author abbrev. (botany): Hutch.

John Hutchinson (7 April 1884 Blindburn, Northumberland – 2 September 1972 London) was an English botanist, taxonomist and author.

The standard author abbreviation Hutch. is used to indicate this person as the author when citing a botanical name.

== Life and career ==
Born in Blindburn, Wark on Tyne, Northumberland, England, he received his horticultural training in Northumberland and Durham and was appointed a student gardener at Kew in 1904. His taxonomic and drawing skills were soon noticed and resulted in his being appointed to the Herbarium in 1905. He moved from assistant in the Indian section to assistant for Tropical Africa, returning to Indian botany from 1915 to 1919, and from then on was in charge of the African section until 1936 when he was appointed Keeper of the Museums of Botany at Kew. He retired in 1948 but continued working on the phylogeny of flowering plants and publishing two parts of The Genera of Flowering Plants.

John Hutchinson proposed a radical revision of the angiosperm classification systems devised by Joseph Dalton Hooker and that of Adolf Engler and Karl Anton Eugen Prantl which had become widely accepted during the 20th century. At its simplest, his system suggested two main divisions of angiosperms, herbaceous and woody.

Hutchinson made two extended collecting trips to South Africa, which were recounted in great detail in A Botanist in Southern Africa. His first visit was from August 1928 to April 1929, and the second from June 1930 to September 1930 on which occasion the expedition travelled north as far as Lake Tanganyika.

== Awards ==
- He was awarded an honorary degree of LL.D. by University of St Andrews in 1934.
- Awarded Veitch Memorial Medal in 1937.
- Awarded the Victoria Medal (horticulture) in 1944 for outstanding contributions to horticulture.
- Awarded Linnean Medal in 1968.
- He was awarded the Linnean Society of London's Darwin-Wallace Medal in 1958.
- He was elected Honorary Fellow of the Association for Tropical Biology and Conservation (ATBC) in 1965
- He was elected a Fellow of the Royal Society (FRS) in 1947
- Awarded O.B.E. shortly before his death
- Commemorated in the genus Hutchinsonia Robyns.

== Personal life ==
Hutchinson was married and had two sons and three daughters, one of whom lived in South Africa. He spent his leisure time roaming the English countryside with his wife in a caravan drawing wild flowers.

At his funeral a wreath largely made of South African flowers was sent by his colleagues at the Royal Botanical Gardens, Kew.

== First Southern Africa trip August 1928 – April 1929 ==
Hutchinson arrived in Table Bay and spent the first few weeks collecting in and around Cape Town and Table Mountain, with short trips further afield. His first lengthy trip was to Namaqualand and Bushmanland with fellow botanist and succulent specialist, Neville Stuart Pillans. Back in Cape Town he purchased a small Citroën car and set off on 30 October in the company of Rudolf Marloth, who left them at Barrydale, and Jan Gillett, the son of Arthur Gillett at the University of Oxford (one of the founders of Oxfam). On this occasion their route followed the southern Cape coast as far as Port Elizabeth. Here Gillett's place was taken by Robert Allen Dyer and the route veered inland to Grahamstown and Katberg, then back to the coast, visiting Butterworth, Port St Johns, Kokstad, Pietermaritzburg and Durban. From here Hutchinson travelled on his own and in Pretoria joined up with General Smuts, who was a keen and knowledgeable botanist, to the far northern Transvaal to explore Lake Fundudzi, sacred to the Venda people.

- 16–22 August 1928 Cape Peninsula
- 25 August Worcester
- 31 August Matjesfontein
- 4 September Malmesbury to Darling
- 5 September Hopefield to Vredenburg
- 6 September coast north of Saldanha Bay
- 10 September Hottentots Holland Mountains
- 16 September above Tulbagh Waterfall
- 21 September Sir Lowry's Pass
- 30 September gorge west of Ceres
- 5 October lighthouse at Sea Point
- 9 October Sutherland to Middlepost
- 10 October near Elandsfontein
- 11 October near Nieuwoudtville
- 13 October near Bitterfontein
- 13 October Garies to Kamieskroon
- 15 October O'okiep to Steinkopf
- 16 October poort between Concordia and Pella
- 16 October Pella to Pofadder
- 18 October Kenhardt
- 27 October Bain's Kloof
- 29 October Paarl
- 30 October Robertson
- 31 October Montagu to Barrydale
- 1 November Waterkloof, Ladismith
- 1 November Seweweekspoort
- 2 November Calitzdorp to Cango
- 3 November southern side of Swartberg Pass
- 4 November Oudtshoorn to Montagu Pass
- 5 November Pacaltsdorp
- 5 November Touws River near George
- 5 November Phantom Pass near Knysna
- 7 November Belvedere near Knysna
- 8 November Plettenberg Bay
- 8 November Bitou River
- 9 November Keurbooms River
- 9 November Grootrivier Pass
- 10 November Witelsbos
- 12 November Kareedouw Pass
- 12 November Kareedouw to Humansdorp
- 13 November Jeffreys Bay
- 14 November Gamtoos River Pass
- 16 November Port Elizabeth to Uitenhage
- 16 November near Addo
- 17 November Howieson's Poort near Grahamstown
- 18 November Bathurst
- 19 November Fish River Valley
- 19 November Pluto's Vale
- 20 November Botha's Hill
- 26 November Grahamstown to Fort Beaufort
- 26 November hills above Balfour
- 27 November top of Katberg
- 28 November Seymour to Alice
- 28 November King William's Town to East London
- 29 November Mooiplaats to Komgha
- 1 December Libode
- 1 December mountain forest near Port St Johns
- 3 December Port St Johns to Lusikisiki
- 3 December Flagstaff
- 4 December Flagstaff to Kokstad
- 5 December Mt Currie
- 6 December Pietermaritzburg Botanical Garden
- 6 December Umgeni
- 10 December Howick, Mooi River
- 11 December Ladysmith, Natal
- 14 December Warmbaths
- 15 December near Potgietersrust
- 16 December Louis Trichardt to Wylliespoort
- 18 December Limpopo River near Messina
- 19 December Dongola
- 21 December Thomson's Store to Lake Fundudzi
- 23 December Witvlag
- 23 December Woodbush near Tzaneen
- 24 December Moorddrift
- 28 December koppie at Fountains Valley near Pretoria
- 31 December Hartebeespoort in the Magaliesberg
- 2 January 1929 Doornkloof near Irene
- 5 January Louw's Creek to Maid of the Mist Mountain
- 7 January Barberton to Louw's Creek
- 7 January Barberton to Lomati Falls
- 8 January Impala Siding near Barberton
- 9 January Komatipoort
- 9 January western slopes of Lebombo Mountains, Portuguese East Africa
- 15 January Horn's Nek, Magaliesberg
- 22 January between Potgietersrust and Swerwerskraal
- 23 January Magalakwin River Bridge
- 24 January north of Blaauwberg
- 29 January Premier Mine near Pretoria
- 30 January between Arnot and Belfast
- 2 February Machadodorp
- 3 February Maskew's farm Suikerboskop near Belfast
- 6 February Magatosnek near Rustenburg
- 7 February Rustenburg to Zeerust
- 8 February hills north of Zeerust
- 9 February 15 miles west of Mafeking
- 10 February Vryburg to Schweizer-Reneke
- 11 February Wolmaransstad and Klerksdorp
- 15 February near Parys, Orange Free State
- 18 February Christiana to Warrenton
- 19 February koppies near Kimberley
- 20 February Kimberley to Riverton
- 21 February Baviaanskrantz near Kaap Plateau
- 22 February hills between Papkuil and Postmasburg
- 23 February hills east of Asbestos Mountains
- 24 February near Campbell
- 28 February Kaffir River to Edenburg, Orange Free State
- 1 March Fauresmith Reserve
- 3 March near Colesberg
- 4 March Kikvorsch Mountains near Noupoort
- 6 March near Tafelberg, Middelburg, Cape Province
- 8 March Roode Hoogte Pass
- 8 March Naude's Pass
- 9 March Groote River to Aberdeen
- 10 March Meiringspoort
- 13 March George
- 15 March Mossel Bay
- 24 March Robinson Pass
- 25 March Riviersonderend
- 26 March Caledon to Hermanus
- 5 April Table Mountain
- 9 April Zeekoevlei

== Second African trip June 1930 – September 1930 ==
Having met Hutchinson on his previous visit to South Africa, General Smuts invited him to join a party consisting of Margaret Clark Gillett with two of her sons, Jan and Anthony, on a trip to Lake Tanganyika. They set off from Irene on 28 June 1930 in a convoy of seven vehicles and were joined at Beit Bridge by Illtyd Buller Pole-Evans. They collected all the way to Lake Tanganyika and then retraced their route to Broken Hill, where Hutchinson boarded a goods train to Elizabethville (Lubumbashi). On his return to Pretoria, and with time in hand, he set off on a trip to the Soutpansberg with Jan Gillett. Then followed a week in the Drakensberg, climbing to the top of Mont-aux-Sources with two fellow botanists, Ms. Verdoorn and Ms. Forbes. A final flurry of collecting at Botha's Hill near Durban, and Port Elizabeth, saw the end of a fruitful visit.

- 29 June 1930 Louis Trichardt
- 30 June Lundi River, Zimbabwe
- 1 July Great Zimbabwe
- 3 July Umvuma, Zimbabwe
- 3 July Gweru, Zimbabwe
- 3 July Shangani River, Zimbabwe
- 3 July Bulawayo, Zimbabwe
- 4 July Bulawayo to Victoria Falls
- 4 July Dett
- 7 July Victoria Falls
- 10 July Livingstone, Zambia
- 10 July Choma
- 12 July Monze
- 12 July Mazabuka
- 12 July Kafue River
- 12 July Lusaka
- 13 July Broken Hill, Zambia
- 14 July Bwana Mkuba
- 14 July Kapiri Mposhi
- 14 July Chiwefwe
- 15 July Serenje Corner
- 16 July Lukulu River
- 16 July Kaloswe
- 16 July Mpika
- 17 July Zambesi River
- 17 July Kasama
- 18 July Mbala (Abercorn)
- 20 July Tom's Village, Lake Tanganyika
- 20 July Mpulungu
- 21 July near Lunzua River
- 22 July 11 miles S of Lake Tanganyika
- 23 July 6 miles N of Kasama
- 24 July Koloswe
- 25 July Chiwefwe
- 30 July Sakania, Democratic Republic of the Congo
- 2 August Lubumbashi (Elizabethville)
- 8 August Matopo
- 18 August Louis Trichardt
- 18 August Goede Hoop
- 19 August Klein Australie, Soutpansberg
- 20 August Entabeni; Palmary; Pepiti Falls
- 23 August Crewe Farm, West Soutpansberg
- 24 August on granite koppie near Matoks
- 3 September Botha's Hill, KwaZulu-Natal

== List of selected publications ==
=== Books ===
- Hutchison, John; Dalziel, John McEwan (1927). Flora of West Tropical Africa, the British West African Colonies: British Cameroons, the French and Portuguese Colonies South of the Tropic of Cancer to Lake Chad, and Fernando Po. Vol. I (Parts 1 & 2). London: Crown Agents for the Colonies. volume II, 1928.
- Hutchinson, John (1934). The families of flowering plants, arranged according to a new system based on their probable phylogeny. 2 vols (1st ed.). Macmillan. Volume 1: Dicotyledonae 1926, Volume 2: Monocotyledonae 1934.
- Hutchinson, John (1959). The families of flowering plants, arranged according to a new system based on their probable phylogeny. 2 vols (2nd ed.). Macmillan. Volume 1: Dicotyledonae at Google Books, Volume 2: Monocotyledonae at Internet Archive Available to borrow: 2 vols
- Hutchinson, John (1973). The families of flowering plants, arranged according to a new system based on their probable phylogeny. 2 vols (3rd ed.). Oxford University Press. ISBN 9783874291606.
- The Genera of Flowering Plants (Oxford, Vol.1 (1964), Vol.2 (1967), Vol. 3 (posthumously)) at * Common Wild Flowers (1945) * More Common Wild Flowers (1948) * Uncommon Wild Flowers (1950) * British Wild Flowers (1955) * The Story of Plants with R. Melville * A Botanist in Southern Africa (London, 1946) * Flora of West Tropical Africa with Dr John McEwen Dalziel /keytofamiliesoff00hutc/page/n5 Internet Archive
- Evolution and Phylogeny of Flowering Plants (1969)

=== Articles ===
- Hutchinson, J. (1923). "Contributions towards a Phylogenetic Classification of Flowering Plants. I". Bulletin of Miscellaneous Information (Royal Botanic Gardens, Kew). 1923 (2): 65–89. doi:10.2307/4118622. ISSN 0366-4457. JSTOR 4118622.
- Hutchinson, John (1936). "A new phylogenetic classification of the monocotyledons". Proceedings of the Zesde Internationaal Botanisch Congres, Amsterdam, 2–7 September 1935. ii: 129–131.

== See also ==
- Hutchinson system
