= Dahlgren system =

System of flowering plant classification

One of the modern systems of plant taxonomy, the Dahlgren system was published by monocot specialist Rolf Dahlgren in 1975 and revised in 1977, and 1980. However, he is best known for his two treatises on monocotyledons in 1982 and revised in 1985. His wife Gertrud Dahlgren continued the work after his death.

Dahlgren ranked the dicotyledons and monocotyledons as subclasses of the class of flowering plants (angiosperms) and further divided them into superorders. Originally (1975) he used the suffix -anae, as did Cronquist, to designate these, but in 1980 changed this to -florae in accordance with Thorne. In the 1989 revision, published by his wife, the alternate names Magnoliidae and Liliidae were dropped in favour of Dicotyledon and Monocotyledon, and the suffix -florae reverted to -anae (e.g. Alismatanae for Alismatiflorae).

Reveal provides an extensive listing of Dahlgren's classification. (Note the synonyms, both nomenclatural and taxonomic, for each name in the system.)

== 1980 system ==
=== Summary ===
- Class Magnoliopsida (flowering plants (Angiospermae or Magnoliophyta)
  Subclass Magnoliidae (dicotyledons) 24 superorders
  - Superorder Magnoliiflorae
    Superorder Nymphaeiflorae
    Superorder Ranunculiflorae
    Superorder Caryophylliflorae
    Superorder Polygoniflorae
    Superorder Malviflorae
    Superorder Violiflorae
    Superorder Theiflorae
    Superorder Primuliflorae
    Superorder Rosiflorae
    Superorder Podostemiflorae
    Superorder Fabiflorae
    Superorder Proteiflorae
    Superorder Myrtiflorae
    Superorder Rutiflorae
    Superorder Santaliflorae
    Superorder Balanophoriflorae
    Superorder Araliiflorae
    Superorder Asteriflorae
    Superorder Solaniflorae
    Superorder Corniflorae
    Superorder Loasiflorae
    Superorder Gentianiflorae
    Superorder Lamiiflorae
  Subclass Liliidae (monocotyledons) 7 superorders
  - Superorder Alismatiflorae
    Superorder Triuridiflorae
    Superorder Ariflorae
    Superorder Liliiflorae
    Superorder Zingiberiflorae
    Superorder Commeliniflorae
    Superorder Areciflorae

=== Magnoliidae (dicotyledons) ===
- Subclass Magnoliiflorae
  Superorder Magnolianae
  Order Annonales
  Family Annonaceae
  Family Myristicaceae
  Family Eupomatiaceae
  Family Canellaceae
  Family Austrobaileyaceae
  Order Aristolochiales
  Family Aristolochiaceae
  Order Rafflesiales
  Family Rafflesiaceae
  Family Hydnoraceae
  Order Magnoliales
  Family Degeneriaceae
  Family Himantandraceae
  Family Magnoliaceae
  Order Lactoridales
  Family Lactoridaceae
  Order Winterales
  Family Winteraceae
  Order Chloranthales
  Family Chloranthaceae
  Order Illiciales
  Family Illiciaceae
  Family Schisandraceae
  Order Laurales
  Family Amborellaceae
  Family Trimeniaceae
  Family Monimiaceae
  Family Gomortegaceae
  Family Calycanthaceae
  Family Lauraceae
  Order Nelumbonales
  Family Nelumbonaceae
  Superorder Nymphaeiflorae
  Order Piperales
  Family Saururaceae
  Family Piperaceae
  Order Nymphaeales
  Family Cabombaceae
  Family Nymphaeaceae
  Family Ceratophyllaceae
  Superorder Ranunculiflorae
  Order Ranunculales
  Family Lardizabalaceae
  Family Sargentodoxaceae
  Family Menispermaceae
  Family Kingdoniaceae
  Family Circaeasteraceae
  Family Ranunculaceae
  Family Hydrastidaceae
  Family Berberidaceae
  Order Papaverales
  Family Papaveraceae
  Family Fumariaceae
  Superorder Caryophylliflorae
  Order Caryophyllales
  Family Molluginaceae
  Family Caryophyllaceae
  Family Phytolaccaceae
  Family Achatocarpaceae
  Family Agdestidaceae
  Family Basellaceae
  Family Portulacaceae
  Family Stegnospermataceae
  Family Nyctaginaceae
  Family Aizoaceae
  Family Halophytaceae
  Family Cactaceae
  Family Didiereaceae
  Family Hectorellaceae
  Family Chenopodiaceae
  Family Amaranthaceae
  Superorder Polygoniflorae
  Order Polygonales
  Family Polygonaceae
  Superorder Malviflorae
  Order Malvales
  Family Sterculiaceae
  Family Plagiopteraceae
  Family Bixaceae
  Family Cochlospermaceae
  Family Cistaceae
  Family Sphaerosepalaceae
  Family Sarcolaenaceae
  Family Huaceae
  Family Tiliaceae
  Family Dipterocarpaceae
  Family Bombacaceae
  Family Malvaceae
  Order Urticales
  Family Ulmaceae
  Family Moraceae
  Family Cecropiaceae
  Family Barbeyaceae
  Family Cannabaceae
  Family Urticaceae
  Order Euphorbiales
  Family Euphorbiaceae
  Family Simmondsiaceae
  Family Pandaceae
  Family Aextoxicaceae
  Family Dichapetalaceae
  Order Plumbaginales
  Family Plumbaginaceae
  Family Limoniaceae
  Order Thymelaeales
  Family Gonystylaceae
  Family Thymelaeaceae
  Order Rhamnales
  Family Rhamnaceae
  Superorder Violiflorae
  Order Violales
  Family Flacourtiaceae
  Family Berberidopsidaceae
  Family Aphloiaceae
  Family Physenaceae
  Family Passifloraceae
  Family Dipentodontaceae
  Family Peridiscaceae
  Family Scyphostegiaceae
  Family Violaceae
  Family Turneraceae
  Family Malesherbiaceae
  Family Caricaceae
  Order Cucurbitales
  Family Achariaceae
  Family Cucurbitaceae
  Family Begoniaceae
  Family Datiscaceae
  Order Salicales
  Family Salicaceae
  Order Tamaricales
  Family Tamaricaceae
  Family Frankeniaceae
  Order Capparales
  Family Capparaceae
  Family Brassicaceae
  Family Tovariaceae
  Family Resedaceae
  Family Gyrostemonaceae
  Family Bataceae
  Family Moringaceae
  Order Tropaeolales
  Family Tropaeolaceae
  Family Limnanthaceae
  Order Salvadorales
  Family Salvadoraceae
  Superorder Theiflorae
  Order Dilleniales
  Family Dilleniaceae
  Order Paeoniales
  Family Glaucidiaceae
  Family Paeoniaceae
  Order Theales
  Family Stachyuraceae
  Family Pentaphylacaceae
  Family Marcgraviaceae
  Family Quiinaceae
  Family Ancistrocladaceae
  Family Dioncophyllaceae
  Family Nepenthaceae
  Family Medusagynaceae
  Family Caryocaraceae
  Family Strasburgeriaceae
  Family Ochnaceae
  Family Chrysobalanaceae
  Family Oncothecaceae
  Family Scytopetalaceae
  Family Theaceae
  Family Bonnetiaceae
  Family Clusiaceae
  Family Elatinaceae
  Order Lecythidales
  Family Lecythidaceae
  Superorder Primuliflorae
  Order Primulales
  Family Myrsinaceae
  Family Aegicerataceae
  Family Theophrastaceae
  Family Primulaceae
  Family Coridaceae
  Order Ebenales
  Family Sapotaceae
  Family Styracaceae
  Family Lissocarpaceae
  Family Ebenaceae
  Superorder Rosiflorae
  Order Trochodendrales
  Family Trochodendraceae
  Family Tetracentraceae
  Order Cercidiphyllales
  Family Cercidiphyllaceae
  Family Eupteleaceae
  Order Hamamelidales
  Family Hamamelidaceae
  Family Platanaceae
  Family Myrothamnaceae
  Order Balanopales
  Family Balanopaceae
  Order Fagales
  Family Nothofagaceae
  Family Fagaceae
  Family Corylaceae
  Family Betulaceae
  Order Juglandales
  Family Rhoipteleaceae
  Family Juglandaceae
  Order Myricales
  Family Myricaceae
  Order Casuarinales
  Family Casuarinaceae
  Order Buxales
  Family Buxaceae
  Family Daphniphyllaceae
  Family Didymelaceae
  Order Geissolomatales
  Family Geissolomataceae
  Order Cunoniales
  Family Cunoniaceae
  Family Baueraceae
  Family Brunelliaceae
  Family Davidsoniaceae
  Family Eucryphiaceae
  Family Bruniaceae
  Family Grubbiaceae
  Order Saxifragales
  Family Saxifragaceae
  Family Francoaceae
  Family Greyiaceae
  Family Brexiaceae
  Family Grossulariaceae
  Family Iteaceae
  Family Cephalotaceae
  Family Crassulaceae
  Order Droserales
  Family Droseraceae
  Family Lepuropetalaceae
  Family Parnassiaceae
  Order Rosales
  Family Rosaceae
  Family Neuradaceae
  Family Malaceae
  Family Amygdalaceae
  Family Anisophylleaceae
  Family Crossosomataceae
  Family Surianaceae
  Family Rhabdodendraceae
  Order Gunnerales
  Family Gunneraceae
  Superorder Podostemiflorae
  Order Podostemales
  Family Podostemaceae (including Tristichaceae)
  Superorder Fabiflorae
  Order Fabales
  Family Mimosaceae
  Family Caesalpiniaceae
  Family Fabaceae
  Superorder Proteiflorae
  Order Proteales
  Family Proteaceae
  Order Elaeagnales
  Family Elaeagnaceae
  Superorder Myrtiflorae
  Order Myrtales
  Family Psiloxylaceae
  Family Heteropyxidaceae
  Family Myrtaceae
  Family Onagraceae
  Family Trapaceae
  Family Lythraceae
  Family Combretaceae
  Family Melastomataceae
  Family Memecylaceae
  Family Crypteroniaceae
  Family Oliniaceae
  Family Penaeaceae
  Family Rhynchocalycaceae
  Family Alzateaceae
  Order Haloragales
  Family Haloragaceae
  Superorder Rutiflorae
  Order Sapindales
  Family Coriariaceae
  Family Anacardiaceae
  Family Leitneriaceae
  Family Podoaceae
  Family Sapindaceae
  Family Hippocastanaceae
  Family Aceraceae
  Family Akaniaceae
  Family Bretschneideraceae
  Family Emblingiaceae
  Family Staphyleaceae
  Family Melianthaceae
  Family Sabiaceae
  Family Meliosmaceae
  Family Connaraceae
  Order Rutales
  Family Rutaceae
  Family Ptaeroxylaceae
  Family Cneoraceae
  Family Simaroubaceae
  Family Tepuianthaceae
  Family Burseraceae
  Family Meliaceae
  Order Polygalales
  Family Malpighiaceae
  Family Trigoniaceae
  Family Vochysiaceae
  Family Polygalaceae
  Family Krameriaceae
  Order Geraniales
  Family Zygophyllaceae
  Family Nitrariaceae
  Family Peganaceae
  Family Balanitaceae
  Family Erythroxylaceae
  Family Humiriaceae
  Family Linaceae
  Family Ctenolophonaceae
  Family Ixonanthaceae
  Family Lepidobotryaceae
  Family Oxalidaceae (including Averrhoaceae)
  Family Geraniaceae
  Family Dirachmaceae
  Family Ledocarpaceae
  Family Vivianiaceae
  Family Biebersteiniaceae
  Order Linales (incorporated into Geraniales)
  Family Linaceae
  Family Humiriaceae
  Family Ctenolophonaceae
  Family Ixonanthaceae
  Family Erythroxylaceae
  Family Lepidobotryaceae
  Family Oxalidaceae
  Order Celastrales
  Family Stackhousiaceae
  Family Lophopyxidaceae
  Family Cardiopteridaceae
  Family Corynocarpaceae
  Family Celastraceae
  Order Rhizophorales
  Family Rhizophoraceae
  Family Elaeocarpaceae
  Order Balsaminales
  Family Balsaminaceae
  Superorder Santaliflorae
  Order Santalales
  Family Olacaceae
  Family Opiliaceae
  Family Loranthaceae
  Family Medusandraceae
  Family Misodendraceae
  Family Eremolepidaceae
  Family Santalaceae
  Family Viscaceae
  Superorder Balanophoriflorae
  Order Balanophorales
  Family Cynomoriaceae
  Family Balanophoraceae
  Superorder Araliiflorae
  Order Pittosporales
  Family Pittosporaceae
  Family Tremandraceae
  Family Byblidaceae
  Order Araliales
  Family Araliaceae
  Family Apiaceae
  Superorder Asteriflorae
  Order Campanulales
  Family Pentaphragmataceae
  Family Campanulaceae
  Family Lobeliaceae
  Order Asterales
  Family Asteraceae
  Superorder Solaniflorae
  Order Solanales
  Family Solanaceae
  Family Sclerophylacaceae
  Family Goetzeaceae
  Family Convolvulaceae
  Family Cuscutaceae
  Family Cobaeaceae
  Family Polemoniaceae
  Order Boraginales
  Family Hydrophyllaceae
  Family Ehretiaceae
  Family Boraginaceae
  Family Lennoaceae
  Family Hoplestigmataceae
  Superorder Corniflorae
  Order Fouquieriales
  Family Fouquieriaceae
  Order Ericales
  Family Actinidiaceae
  Family Clethraceae
  Family Cyrillaceae
  Family Ericaceae
  Family Empetraceae
  Family Monotropaceae
  Family Pyrolaceae
  Family Epacridaceae
  Order Eucommiales
  Family Eucommiaceae
  Order Sarraceniales
  Family Sarraceniaceae
  Order Cornales
  Family Garryaceae
  Family Alangiaceae
  Family Nyssaceae
  Family Cornaceae
  Family Roridulaceae
  Family Davidiaceae
  Family Escalloniaceae
  Family Helwingiaceae
  Family Torricelliaceae
  Family Aucubaceae
  Family Aralidiaceae
  Family Diapensiaceae
  Family Phellinaceae
  Family Aquifoliaceae
  Family Paracryphiaceae
  Family Sphenostemonaceae
  Family Symplocaceae
  Family Icacinaceae
  Family Montiniaceae
  Family Columelliaceae
  Family Stylidiaceae (including Donatiaceae)
  Family Alseuosmiaceae
  Family Hydrangeaceae
  Family Sambucaceae
  Family Viburnaceae
  Family Menyanthaceae
  Family Adoxaceae
  Family Phyllonomaceae
  Family Tribelaceae
  Family Eremosynaceae
  Family Pterostemonaceae
  Family Tetracarpaeaceae
  Order Dipsacales
  Family Caprifoliaceae
  Family Valerianaceae
  Family Dipsacaceae
  Family Morinaceae
  Family Calyceraceae
  Superorder Loasiflorae
  Order Loasales
  Family Loasaceae
  Superorder Gentianiflorae
  Order Goodeniales
  Family Goodeniaceae
  Order Oleales
  Family Oleaceae
  Order Gentianales
  Family Desfontainiaceae
  Family Loganiaceae
  Family Dialypetalanthaceae
  Family Rubiaceae
  Family Theligonaceae
  Family Gentianaceae
  Family Saccifoliaceae
  Family Apocynaceae
  Family Asclepiadaceae
  Superorder Lamiiflorae
  Order Lamiales
  Family Retziaceae
  Family Stilbaceae
  Family Buddlejaceae
  Family Scrophulariaceae
  Family Myoporaceae
  Family Globulariaceae
  Family Plantaginaceae
  Family Lentibulariaceae
  Family Pedaliaceae
  Family Trapellaceae
  Family Martyniaceae
  Family Gesneriaceae
  Family Bignoniaceae
  Family Acanthaceae
  Family Verbenaceae
  Family Lamiaceae
  Family Callitrichaceae
  Order Hydrostachyales
  Family Hydrostachyaceae
  Order Hippuridales
  Family Hippuridaceae

== 1982 system (monocotyledons) ==
=== Summary ===
Six superorders

- Superorder Alismatiflorae
- Superorder Ariflorae
- Superorder Liliiflorae
- Superorder Zingiberiflorae
- Superorder Commeliniflorae
- Superorder Areciflorae

=== Details ===
- Superorder Alismatiflorae 5 orders
- Superorder Ariflorae 1 order
  - Order Arales
- Superorder Liliiflorae 11 orders
  - Order Dioscoreales
  - Order Taccales
  - Order Asparagales
    - Family Smilacaceae
    - Family Petermanniaceae
    - Family Philesiaceae
    - Family Convallariaceae
    - Family Asparagaceae
    - Family Herreriaceae
    - Family Dracaenaceae
    - Family Doryanthaceae
    - Family Dasypogonaceae
    - Family Phormiaceae
    - Family Xanthorrhoeaceae
    - Family Agavaceae
    - Family Hypoxidaceae
    - Family Asphodelaceae
    - Family Aphyllanthaceae
    - Family Dianellaceae
    - Family Tecophilaeaceae
    - Family Cyanastraceae
    - Family Eriospermaceae
    - Family Hemerocallidaceae
    - Family Funkiaceae
    - Family Hyacinthaceae
    - Family Alliaceae
    - Family Amaryllidaceae
  - Order Liliales
    - Family Iridaceae
    - Family Geosiridaceae
    - Family Colchicaceae
    - Family Alstroemeriaceae
    - Family Tricyrtidaceae
    - Family Calochortaceae
    - Family Liliaceae
    - Family Melanthiaceae
  - Order Burmanniales
  - Order Orchidales
  - Order Pontederiales
  - Order Haemodorales
  - Order Philydrales
  - Order Velloziales
  - Order Bromeliales
- Superorder Zingiberiflorae 1 order
  - Order Zingiberales
- Superorder Commeliniflorae 8 orders
- Superorder Areciflorae 3 orders

== 1985 system (monocotyledons) ==
=== Summary ===
Ten superorders

- Superorder Liliiflorae
- Superorder Ariflorae
- Superorder Triuridiflorae
- Superorder Alismatiflorae
- Superorder Bromeliiflorae
- Superorder Zingiberiflorae
- Superorder Commeliniflorae
- Superorder Cyclanthiflorae
- Superorder Areciflorae
- Superorder Pandaniflorae

=== Details ===
==== Liliiflorae ====
- Superorder Liliiflorae 6 orders p. 107
  Order Dioscoreales
  Family Trichopodaceae
  Family Dioscoreaceae
  Family Taccaceae
  Family Stemonaceae
  Family Trilliaceae
  Family Smilacaceae
  Family Petermanniaceae
  Order Asparagales
  Family Philesiaceae
  Family Luzuriagaceae
  Family Convallariaceae
  Family Asparagaceae
  Family Ruscaceae
  Family Herreriaceae
  Family Dracaenaceae
  Family Nolinaceae
  Family Asteliaceae
  Family Hanguanaceae
  Family Dasypogonaceae
  Family Calectasiaceae
  Family Blandfordiaceae
  Family Xanthorrhoeaceae
  Family Agavaceae
  Family Hypoxidaceae
  Family Tecophilaeaceae
  Family Cyanastraceae
  Family Eriospermaceae
  Family Ixioliriaceae
  Family Phormiaceae
  Family Doryanthaceae
  Family Hemerocallidaceae
  Family Asphodelaceae
  Family Anthericaceae
  Family Aphyllanthaceae
  Family Funkiaceae
  Family Hyacinthaceae
  Family Alliaceae
  Family Amaryllidaceae
  Tribe Amaryllideae
  Tribe Hippeastrae
  Tribe Lycoridae
  Tribe Stenomesseae
  Tribe Eucharideae
  Tribe Pancratieae
  Tribe Narcisseae
  Tribe Galantheae
  Order Melanthiales
  Family Melanthiaceae
  Family Campynemaceae
  Order Burmanniales
  Family Burmanniaceae
  Family Thismiaceae
  Family Corsiaceae
  Order Liliales
  Family Alstroemeriaceae
  Family Colchicaceae
  Family Uvulariaceae
  Family Calochortaceae
  Family Liliaceae
  Family Geosiridaceae
  Family Iridaceae
  Order Orchids
  Family Apostasiaceae
  Family Cypripediaceae
  Family Orchidaceae

==== Ariflorae ====
- Superorder Ariflorae 1 order p. 275
  Order Arales
  Family Araceae
  Family Lemnaceae

==== Triuridiflorae ====
- Superorder Triuridiflorae 1 order p. 287
  Order Triuridales
  Family Triuridaceae

==== Alismatiflorae ====
- Superorder Alismatiflorae 2 orders p. 292
  Order Alismatales
  Family Aponogetonaceae
  Family Butomaceae
  Family Limnocharitaceae
  Family Alismataceae
  Family Hydrocharitaceae
  Order Najadales
  Family Scheuchzeriaceae
  Family Juncaginaceae
  Family Potamogetonaceae
  Family Posidoniaceae
  Family Zosteraceae
  Family Zannichelliaceae
  Family Cymodoceaceae
  Family Najadaceae

==== Bromeliiflorae ====
- Superorder Bromeliflorae 6 orders p. 323
  Order Velloziales
  Family Velloziaceae
  Order Bromeliales
  Family Bromeliaceae
  Order Philydrales
  Family Philydraceae
  Order Haemodorales
  Family Haemodoraceae
  Order Pontederiales
  Family Pontederiaceae
  Order Typhales
  Family Sparganiaceae
  Family Typhaceae

==== Zingiberiflorae ====
- Superorder Zingiberiflorae 1 order p. 350
  Order Zingiberales
  Family Lowiaceae
  Family Musaceae
  Family Heliconiaceae
  Family Strelitziaceae
  Family Zingiberaceae
  Family Costaceae
  Family Cannaceae
  Family Marantaceae

==== Commeliniflorae ====
- Superorder Commeliniflorae 4 orders p. 374
  Order Commelinales
  Family Commelinaceae
  Family Mayacaceae
  Family Xyridaceae
  Family Rapateaceae
  Family Eriocaulaceae
  Order Hydatellales
  Family Hydatellaceae
  Order Cyperales
  Family Juncaceae
  Family Thurniaceae
  Family Cyperaceae
  Order Poales
  Family Flagellariaceae
  Family Joinvilleaceae
  Family Poaceae
  Family Ecdeiocolaceae
  Family Anarthriaceae
  Family Restionaceae
  Family Centrolepidaceae

==== Cyclanthiflorae ====
- Superorder Cyclanthiflorae 1 order p. 461
  Order Cyclanthales
  Family Cyclanthaceae

==== Areciflorae ====
- Superorder Areciflorae 1 order p. 467
  Order Arecales
  Family Arecaceae

==== Pandaniflorae ====
- Superorder Pandaniflorae 1 order p. 480
  Order Pandanales
  Family Pandanaceae

== Bibliography ==
- Dahlgren, Gertrud (July 1989). "An updated angiosperm classification". Botanical Journal of the Linnean Society. 100 (3): 197–203. doi:10.1111/j.1095-8339.1989.tb01717.x.
- Dahlgren, R. (1975). "A system of classification of angiosperms to be used to demonstrate the distribution of characters". Botaniska Notiser. 128: 119–147.
- Dahlgren, Rolf (1977). A commentary on a diagrammatic presentation of the angiosperms in relation to the distribution of character states. pp. 253–284., in Kubitzki (1977)
- Kubitzki, Klaus, ed. (1977). Flowering Plants : Evolution and classification of higher categories. Symposium, Hamburg, September 8–12, 1976. Plant Systematics & Evolution - Supplementum 1. Wien: Springer. p. 416. ISBN 978-3-211-81434-5.
- Dahlgren, R. M. T. (February 1980). "A revised system of classification of the angiosperms". Botanical Journal of the Linnean Society. 80 (2): 91–124. doi:10.1111/j.1095-8339.1980.tb01661.x.
- Dahlgren, Rolf; Clifford, H. T. (1982). The monocotyledons: A comparative study. London and New York: Academic Press.
- Dahlgren, R.M.; Clifford, H.T.; Yeo, P.F. (1985). The families of the monocotyledons. Berlin: Springer-Verlag. ISBN 978-3-642-64903-5. Additional excerpts
