= Lilianae =

Order of flowering plants

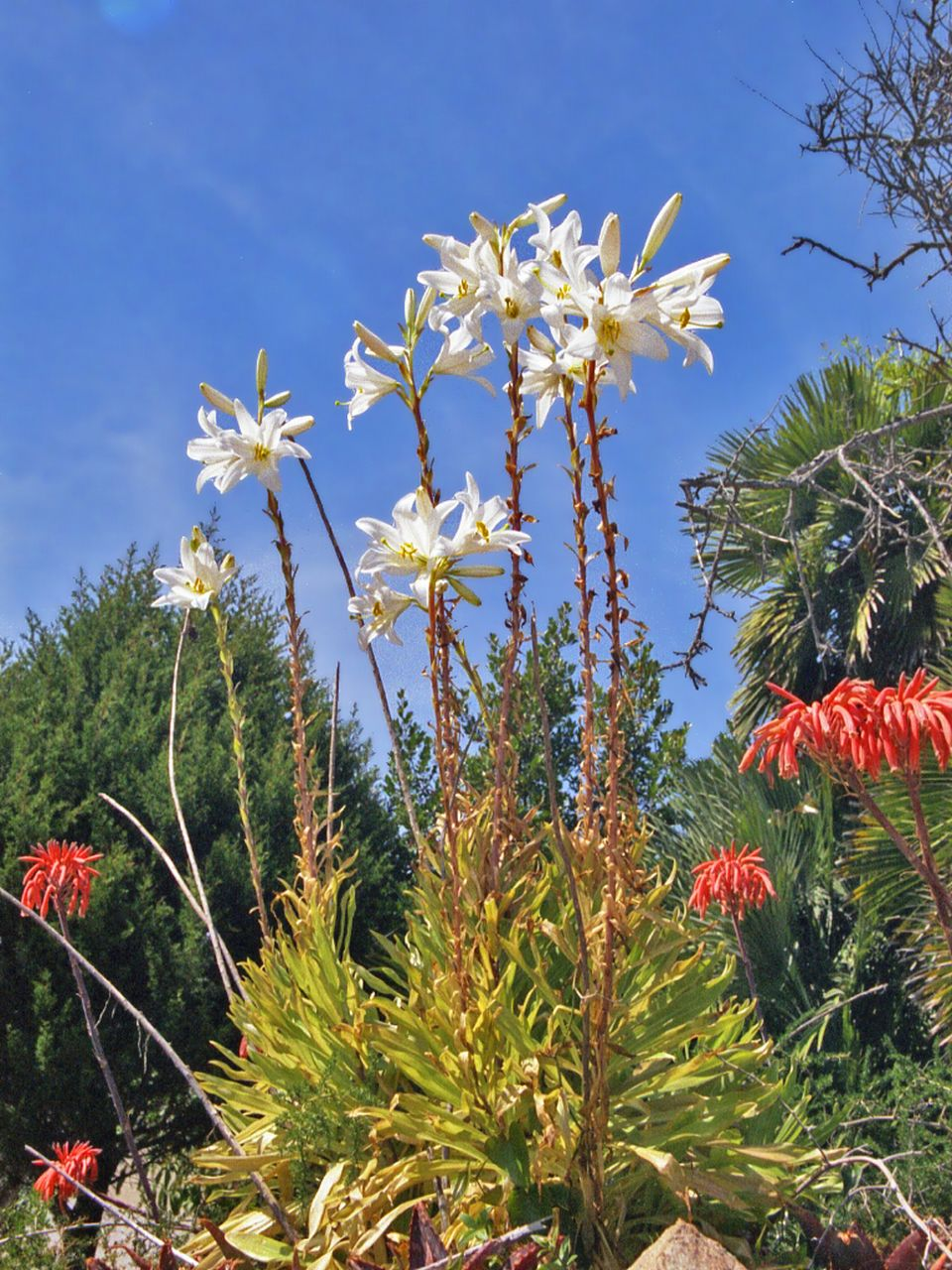
Lilium candidum

Lilianae (also known as Liliiflorae) is a botanical name for a superorder (that is, a rank higher than that of order) of flowering plants. Such a superorder of necessity includes the type family Liliaceae (and usually the type order Liliales). Terminations at the rank of superorder are not standardized by the International Code of Nomenclature for algae, fungi, and plants (ICN), although the suffix -anae has been proposed. (Note: While not an official nomenclature sensu ICN, the suffix -anae for superorders is generally accepted. Under Article 16 of the ICN code, Lilianae qualifies under "automatically typified names".)

Lilianae, introduced in 1966 as a name for a superorder, progressively replaced the older term Liliiflorae, introduced in 1825 as a name for an order.

== Taxonomy ==
=== History ===
==== Early history - Liliiflorae ====
Liliiflorae was a term introduced by Carl Adolph Agardh in 1825 as a higher order to include the Liliaceae (which he called Coronariae) and related families. Argadh, together with De Candolle developed the concept of ordered botanical ranks, in this case grouping together De Jussieu's (1789) recently defined collections of genera (families) into higher order groupings (orders). (Note: All suprageneric nomenclature is therefore dated from this publication, 4 August 1789 under article 13 of the ICN.) However, at the time what are now known as families were referred to by the term ordo, and in Argadh's nomenclature these were grouped into classes.

While De Jussieu placed the type family or ordo, Lilia together with seven other ordines in the Classis, Stamina Perigyna of the Monocotyledones (monocots), de Candolle, who called the type family Liliacées in French, considered them to belong within those vascular plants (Vasculares) whose vascular bundles were thought to arise from within (Endogènes, endogenous), a term he preferred to Monocotylédonés. Jussieu's Monocotyledones thus became the Phanérogames, meaning "visible seed", hence Endogenæ phanerogamæ. De Candolle's Phanérogames thus defined included 22 familles. By contrast, Argadh's more specific grouping of classis Liliiflorae contained only ten families, and positioned the Liliiflorae within a larger grouping, the Cryptocotyledoneae (i.e. Endogènes).

A number of different terms were used successively to group together Liliaceae and related families, including Liliales (Lindley, 1853), Coronariae (Bentham and Hooker, 1883) and Liliinées (Van Tieghem, 1891), till Engler (1892) reintroduced Liliiflorae as a Reihe (order). This form of classification was continued by Wettstein (1901–1908) and Lotsy (1907–1911). A number of other authors preferred Liliales, including Warming (1912) and Bessey (1915), although Hallier (1912) preferred Liliiflorae. These were all essentially orders, groupings of families within the monocotyledons, with a few exceptions. Calestani (1933) created series, in three groupings with Liliaceae in one of three series making up Liranthae, while Hutchinson (1934, 1959) called these divisions, placing Liliaceae in the order Liliales, and division Corolliferae. In 1956 Kimura, in a many layered scheme, placed Liliaceae within the order Liliales as part of Liliiflorae, similarly Emberger's (1960) Liliiflores, although Melchior (1964) returned Liliiflorae to the rank of order. Very few of these classifications had much in common, other than nomenclature, being based on very different concepts of connections between characteristics.

==== Superorder Lilianae ====
The late 1960s saw a marked shift in the taxonomic treatment of this group, with the publication of four systems that would remain influential for the best part of the century, and which predominantly used the concept of superorder. These were the systems of Armen Takhtajan (1910–2009), Arthur Cronquist (1919–1992), Robert Thorne (1920–2015) and Rolf Dahlgren (1932–1987). In 1964 Zabinkova proposed formal rules for naming taxa above the rank of order, where superorders would end with the suffix -anae. In the same issue of Taxon Takhtajan utilised those suggested rules to outline a coherent hierarchical supraordinal classification, as follows.

Subdivisio Magnolicae (Angiospermae)

- Classis Magnoliatae (Dicotyledones)
- Classis Liliatae (Monocotyledones)
  - Subclassis Alismatidae
  - Subclassis Liliidae
    - Superordo Lilianae
      - Ordo Liliales
      - Ordo Bromeliales
      - Ordo Iridales
      - Ordo Dioscoreales
      - Ordo Zingiberales
      - Ordo Haemodorales
      - Ordo Orchidales
    - Superordo Juncanae (Note: Juncanae were subsequently subsumed into Lilianae, and hence are listed as a synonym)
  - Subclassis Commelinidae
  - Subclassis Arecidae

This was the first use of the term Lilianae by him, but was not formally described and hence attributed (superordo nov.) till 1966, when he published a formal monograph (in Russian, English translation available 1969) on the classification of the flowering plants. He considered Lilianae a synonym of Liliiforae. At the same time Cronquist and Takhtajan, who had worked closely together, jointly published a formal proposal in English for the nomenclature and classification of the supraordinal taxa, to the level of class. (Note: Cronquist's earlier work had not considered ranks below class)

In that system, which differed only in minor detail from 1964 (which see) he placed Lilianae together with Juncanae as superorders of the subclass Liliidae, one of four in class Liliatae (i.e. Monocotyledones). Although its composition changed over time, Takhtajan continued its basic structure through to his last work in 2009, in which the Lilianae is one of four superorders of Lillidae. Cronquist developed his system in a rather different way, producing his first overall classification in 1968 (revised 1988), based on subclasses, but not superorders. This placed two orders, Liliales and Orchidales into the subclass Liliidae, and did not contain the Lilianae.

By contrast Thorne, who produced his system in 1968, created five superorders amongst the monocotyledons, but called the superorder corresponding to Lilianae, by the older name of Liliiflorae, with only one order, Liliales. Thorne produced many revisions of his original scheme but in 1992 he decided to follow the practice of his contemporaries (Takhtajan, Cronquist and the Dahlgrens) and abandon the use of Liliiflorae (since the suffix only applied to angiosperms) and adopt Lilianae. In this version Lilianae was one of nine superorders within subclass Liliidae (monocotyledons) and contained five orders, Liliales, Burmanniales, Asparagales, Dioscoreales, and Orchidales. Huber's study of the seed-coat characteristics of Liliiflorae (Liliifloren) in 1969, and his integration of these with other evidence resulted in a radically novel taxonomy for this group. His much narrower conception of families, was an important stepping stone towards the modern family structure.

Rolf Dahlgren, who followed Huber's concepts on structure, had followed Takhtajan in using the term Lilianae in his 1977 classification although many of his contemporaries continued to use the older Liliiflorae. Clifford provides a comparison between Takhtajan and the Cronquist system at that time. Later, in 1980 Dahlgren reverted to Liliiflorae, explaining he was following the example of Robert Thorne (1968, 1976) since this had precedence over Cronquist (1968) (Note: Dahlgren is mistaken in this. Cronquist never accepted the concept of superorder, or used the terms Liliiflorae or Lilianae, an error that has been repeated in a number of subsequent sources, e.g. Thorne 1992) and Takhtajan (1969). (Note: Possibly in 1980 Dahlgren was unaware of Takhtajan's original Russian publication from 1966, citing only the 1969 English translation, which established Takhtajan's precedence) In his subsequent books on the monocotyledons, only Liliiflorae was used. Following Rolf Dahlgren's death in 1987 his wife, Gertrud Dahlgren, continued their work and published a further revision in 1989 that reverted to Lilianae.

Dahlgren's final work (1985), whose family structure was the basis for the modern system, placed Liliiflorae as one of ten superorders within the monocotyledons, and containing five orders;

- Dioscoreales
- Asparagales
- Melanthiales
- Burmanniales
- Liliales

with Gertrud Dahlgren subsequently separating off the Orchidales from Liliales in 1989.

Thorne issued successive versions of his scheme but in the second of his 1992 revisions he also reverted to the use of the suffix -anae over -florae for superorders, like Dahlgren mistakenly believing that Cronquist had used the term (see note above). Following Dahlgren et al.'s The families of the monocotyledons (1985) the next major monograph on the flowering plants was Kubitzki and Huber's The families and genera of vascular plants (1998), which also used Lilanae as a superorder. (Note: Dahlgren had been appointed to edit the section on monocotyledons, prior to his untimely death) These systems usually placed Lilianae within subclass Liliidae of class Liliopsida.

In addition to these systems of plant taxonomy that recognise a superorder Lilianae (Liliiflorae) are the Reveal system and the Angiosperm Phylogeny Group (APG). In the latter system, the Lilianae are also referred to as the informal unranked clade monocots.

=== Phylogeny ===
Cladogram : Phylogeny of the orders of Lilianae, showing orders considered "Lilioids"

- Lilianae
  - - - Acorales
      - - Alismatales
        - - Petrosaviales
          - - - Dioscoreales
              - Pandanales
            - - Liliales
              - - Asparagales
                - commelinids
                  - Dasypogonaceae
                  - Arecales
                  - Poales
                  - - Zingiberales
                    - Commelinales

1. Phylogenetic tree reflecting relationships based on molecular phylogenetic evidence.

2. The Dasypogonaceae represent an unplaced commelinid family, for which the order Dasypogonales has been suggested.
3. "Lilioids": Lilioid monocots.

== See also ==
- List of systems of plant taxonomy

== Bibliography ==
=== Books and symposia ===
- Chaudefaud, Marius; Emberger, Louis (1960). Traité de Botanique systématique 2 vols (in French). Paris: Masson.
- Cronquist, Arthur (1988) [1968]. The evolution and classification of flowering plants (2nd ed.). Bronx, N.Y., USA: New York Botanical Garden. ISBN 9780893273323.
- Dahlgren, Rolf; Clifford, H. T. (1982). The monocotyledons: A comparative study. London and New York: Academic Press. ISBN 9780122006807.
- Dahlgren, R.M.; Clifford, H.T.; Yeo, P.F. (1985). The families of the monocotyledons: Structure, evolution and taxonomy. Berlin: Springer-Verlag. ISBN 978-3-642-64903-5.
- Hawksworth, David L. (2010). Terms used in bionomenclature: the naming of organisms and plant communities. Including terms used in botanical, cultivated plant, phylogenetic, phytosociological, prokaryote (bacteriological), virus, and zoological nomenclature. Copenhagen: Global Biodiversity Information Facility. ISBN 97887-92020-09-3. Also available as pdf document Archived 2016-03-04 at the Wayback Machine
- Kubitzki, Klaus, ed. (1977). Flowering plants: Evolution and classification of higher categories. Symposium, Hamburg, September 8–12, 1976. Plant Systematics and Evolution. Vol. 1. Vienna: Springer. ISBN 978-3-211-81434-5.
- Kubitzki, Klaus; Huber, Herbert, eds. (1998). The families and genera of vascular plants. Vol.3. Flowering plants. Monocotyledons: Lilianae (except Orchidaceae). Berlin, Germany: Springer-Verlag. ISBN 978-3-540-64060-8.
- Naikh, V.N. (1984). Taxonomy of Angiosperms. New Delhi: Tata McGraw-Hill Education. ISBN 9780074517888.
- Pooja (2004). Angiosperms. New Delhi: Discovery. ISBN 9788171417889.
- Rudall, P.J.; Cribb, P.J.; Cutler, D.F.; Humphries, C.J., eds. (1995). Monocotyledons: systematics and evolution (Proceedings of the International Symposium on Monocotyledons: Systematics and Evolution, Kew 1993). Kew: Royal Botanic Gardens. ISBN 978-0-947643-85-0. Archived from the original on 5 January 2014.
- Singh, Gurcharan (2004). "Armen Takhtajan". Plant Systematics: An Integrated Approach. Science Publishers. pp. 269–277. ISBN 978-1-57808-351-0.
- Takhtajan, Armen Leonovich (1966). "Lilianae". Система и филогения цветкорых растений (Sistema i filogeniia tsvetkovykh rastenii) [Systema et Phylogemia Magnoliophytorum] (in Russian). Moscow: Наука. p. 473. ISBN 978-0-05-001715-9. trans. C Jeffrey, as Flowering plants: Origin and dispersal, Edinburgh : Oliver and Boyd, 1969.
- Takhtajan, Armen Leonovich (2009). Flowering Plants. Springer. ISBN 978-1-4020-9609-9.

==== Historical sources ====
- Jussieu, Antoine Laurent de (1789). Genera Plantarum, secundum ordines naturales disposita juxta methodum in Horto Regio Parisiensi exaratam (in Latin). Paris: apud viduam Herissant et Theophilum Barrois. OCLC 5161409.
- Agardh, Carl Adolph (1825). Classes Plantarum (in Latin). Lund: Literis Berlingianis.
- Candolle, A. P. de (1813). Théorie élémentaire de la botanique, ou exposition des principes de la classification naturelle et de l'art de décrire et d'etudier les végétaux (in French).
- Lindley, John (1853) [1846]. The Vegetable Kingdom: or, The structure, classification, and uses of plants, illustrated upon the natural system (3rd. ed.). London: Bradbury & Evans.
- Bentham, G.; Hooker, J.D. (1862–1883). Genera plantarum ad exemplaria imprimis in herbariis kewensibus servata definita (in Latin). London: L Reeve & Co.
- Van Tieghem, Philippe Édouard Léon (1891) [1884]. Traité de botanique (in French) (2nd ed.). Paris: Savy.
- Kerner von Marilaun, Anton (1895–1896) [1890–1891]. Pflanzenleben [The natural history of plants, their forms, growth, reproduction, and distribution]. Translated by F.W. Oliver et al. New York: Holt. p. vol 4: 603.
- Engler, Adolf (1892). Syllabus der Vorlesungen über specielle und medicinisch-pharmaceutische Botanik. Eine Uebersicht über das gesammte Pflanzensystem mit Berücksichtigung der Medicinal-und Nutzpflanzen (in German) (1st ed.). Berlin: Gebrüder Borntraeger Verlag. p. 143.
- Wettstein, Richard (1901–1908). Handbuch der Systematischen Botanik 2 vols (1st ed.). Vienna: Deuticke.
- Lotsy, Johannes Paulus (1907–1911). Vorträge über botanische Stammesgeschichte, gehalten an der Reichsuniversität zu Leiden. Ein Lehrbuch der Pflanzensystematik (in German). Jena: Fischer.
- Warming, Eugenius (1912). Frøplanterne (Spermatofyter) (in Danish). Kjøbenhavn: Gyldendalske Boghandel Nordisk Forlag.
- Bessey, C E (1915). "The phylogenetic taxonomy of flowering plants". Annals of the Missouri Botanical Garden. 2 (1/2): 109–164. doi:10.2307/2990030. JSTOR 2990030.
- Hallier, H (1912). "L'origine et le système phylétique des angiospermes exposés à l'aide de leur arbre généalogique". Archives Néerlandaises des Sciences Exactes et Naturelles, Série III. B. 1: 146–234.
- Calestani, Vittorio (1933). "Le origini e la classificazione delle Angiosperme". Archo. Bot. Sist. Fito-Geogr. Genet. 9: 274–311.
- Hutchinson, John (1934). The families of flowering plants, arranged according to a new system based on their probable phylogeny. 2 vols (1st ed.). Macmillan. Volume 1: Monocotyledonae 1926, Volume 2:Dicotyledonae 1934.
- Hutchinson, John (1959). The families of flowering plants, arranged according to a new system based on their probable phylogeny. 2 vols (2nd ed.). Macmillan.
- Melchior, Hans; Werdermann, Erich, eds. (1964) [1892]. A. Engler's Syllabus der Pflanzenfamilien (12th ed.). Stuttgart: Schweizerbart.

=== Chapters ===
- Chase, M.W.; Duvall, M.R.; Hills, H.G.; Conran, J.G.; Cox, A.V.; Eguiarte, L.E.; Hartwell, J.; Fay, M.F.; Caddick, L.R.; Cameron, K.M.; Hoot, S. "Molecular phylogenetics of Lilianae". In Rudall et al. (1995), pp. 109–137.
- Clifford, H. T. "Quantitative studies of inter-relationships amongst the Liliatae". In Kubitzki (1977), pp. 77–96.
- Dahlgren, Rolf. "A commentary on a diagrammatic presentation of the angiosperms in relation to the distribution of character states". In Kubitzki (1977), pp. 253–284.
- Huber, H. "The treatment of the monocotyledons in an evolutionary system of classification". In Kubitzki (1977), pp. 285–298.
- Kubitzki, K.; Rudall, P.J.; Chase, M.C. "Systematics and evolution". In Kubitzki & Huber (1998), pp. 23–33.
- Tamura, M. N. "Liliaceae". In Kubitzki & Huber (1998), pp. 343–353.
- Thorne, Robert F. "Some Realignments in the Angiospermae". In Kubitzki (1977), pp. 299–319.

=== Articles ===
- Chase, Mark W. (2004). "Monocot relationships: an overview". American Journal of Botany. 91 (10): 1645–1655. doi:10.3732/ajb.91.10.1645. PMID 21652314.
- Chase, Mark W; Reveal, James L (2009). "A phylogenetic classification of the land plants to accompany APG III" (PDF). Botanical Journal of the Linnean Society. 161 (2): 122–127. doi:10.1111/j.1095-8339.2009.01002.x.
- Cronquist, Arthur (October 1960). "The divisions and classes of plants". The Botanical Review. 26 (4): 425–482. Bibcode:1960BotRv..26..425C. doi:10.1007/BF02940572. S2CID 43144314.
- Cronquist, Arthur; Takhtajan, Armen; Zimmermann, Walter (April 1966). "On the Higher Taxa of Embryobionta". Taxon. 15 (4): 129–134. doi:10.2307/1217531. JSTOR 1217531.
- Dahlgren, Gertrud (July 1989). "An updated angiosperm classification". Botanical Journal of the Linnean Society. 100 (3): 197–203. doi:10.1111/j.1095-8339.1989.tb01717.x.
- Dahlgren, R. M. T. (February 1980). "A revised system of classification of the angiosperms". Botanical Journal of the Linnean Society. 80 (2): 91–124. doi:10.1111/j.1095-8339.1980.tb01661.x.
- Dumortier, B (3 July 1864). "Discours sur la marche de la classification générale des plantes depuis Jussieu jusqu à nos jours". Bulletins de la Société Royale de Botanique de Belgique (in French). III: 155–208.
- Huber, H (1969). "Die Samenmerkmale und Verwandtschaftsverhältnisse der Liliifloren". Mitt. Bot. Staatssamml.[Mitteilungen der Botanischen Staatssammlung München] (in German). 8: 219–538.
- Kimura, Yojiro (1956). "Système et phylogénie des monocotyledones". Notulae Systematicae, Herbier du Muséum de Paris. 15: 137–159.
- Meerow, A.W. (February 2002). "The new phylogeny of the Lilioid Monocotyledons". Acta Horticulturae (570): 31–45. doi:10.17660/ActaHortic.2002.570.2. Archived from the original on January 27, 2016.
- Reveal, James L; Bedell, Hollis G (November 1983). "Proposals (1, 2). Add the Rank Superorder Denoted by -anae" (PDF). Taxon. 32 (4): 661–662. doi:10.2307/1221761. JSTOR 1221761.
- Reveal, J.L. (2 April 2012). "An outline of a classification scheme for extant flowering plants" (PDF). Phytoneuron (37): 1–221.
- Takhtajan, A. (June 1964). "The Taxa of the Higher Plants above the Rank of Order". Taxon. 13 (5): 160–164. doi:10.2307/1216134. JSTOR 1216134.
- Thorne, R.F. (1968). "Synopsis of a putative phylogenetic classification of flowering plants". Aliso. 6 (4): 57–66. doi:10.5642/aliso.19680604.06.
- Thorne, Robert F (1976). "A Phylogenetic Classification of the Angiospermae". Evolutionary Biology. Vol. 9. pp. 35–106. doi:10.1007/978-1-4615-6950-3_2. ISBN 978-1-4615-6952-7. PMC 2645363. PMID 19208237.
- Thorne, Robert F. (February 1983). "Proposed new realignments in the angiosperms". Nordic Journal of Botany. 3 (1): 85–117. doi:10.1111/j.1756-1051.1983.tb01447.x.
- Thorne, R.F. (1992a). "An updated phylogenetic classification of the flowering plants". Aliso. 13 (2): 365–389. doi:10.5642/aliso.19921302.08. S2CID 85738663.
- Thorne, R.F. (1992b). "Classification and geography of the flowering plants". The Botanical Review. 58 (3): 225–348. Bibcode:1992BotRv..58..225T. doi:10.1007/BF02858611. S2CID 40348158.
- Zabinkova, Nora (June 1964). "Names of Taxa above the Rank of Order". Taxon. 13 (5): 157–160. doi:10.2307/1216133. JSTOR 1216133.

=== Other ===
- ICN (2011). "International Code of Nomenclature for algae, fungi, and plants". Bratislava: International Association for Plant Taxonomy.
- MBG (2015). "Tropicos". Missouri Botanical Garden.
- Reveal, James L (6 February 2008). "Index nominum supragenericorum plantarum vascularium". Plant Biology. Cornell University.
