= Burmanniales =

Former order of flowering plants

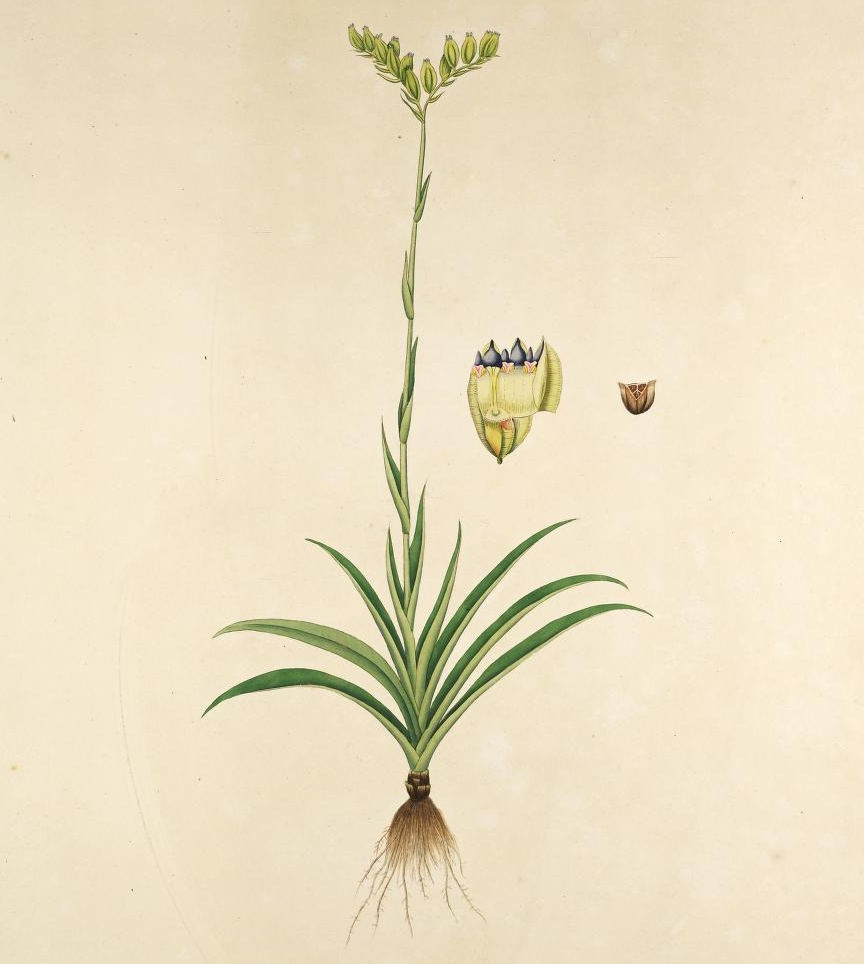
Burmannia disticha L. (Type species)

Burmanniales Mart. (Burmanniales Blume, Burmanniales Heintze) (Note: The botanical authority was attributed to Heintze by Hoogland and Reveal in 2005, but subsequently revised to Martius in view of changes to the International Code of Nomenclature for algae, fungi, and plants (ICN) at the Vienna Botanical Congress that year. However the authority has also been attributed to Blume, by the same author. The Angiosperm Phylogeny Web gives Martius.) was an order of monocotyledons, subsequently discontinued.

== Description ==
Small perennial or annual mycorrhizal herbs that are achlorophyllous (lacking chlorophyll) and mycotrophic or less often autotrophic.

== Systematics and taxonomy ==
Carl Friedrich Philipp von Martius listed the ordo (that is, family) (Note: The term Ordo at that time was closer to what we now understand as Family, rather than Order.) Burmanniaceae in 1835 and consequently has been cited as an authority, although he acknowledged earlier descriptions by Carl Ludwig Blume (1827) and John Lindley (1830).

In 1927 Heintze elevated the Burmanniaceae family to the rank of the Burmanniales order. Subsequent authors have followed this, including Lawrence 1951, Hutchinson 1973, Dahlgren 1980) and Thorne 1992. Johri et al. treat the 17 families of order Liliiflorae as distributed over 5 suborders, including Burmanniineae Engl.. The latter suborder was then considered to contain two families, Burmanniaceae and Corsiaceae. As circumscribed by Dahlgren (sensu Dahlgren) it was one of five orders belonging to the superorder Liliiflorae and was composed of three families, Burmanniaceae (the type family), Thismiaceae, and Corsiaceae. Later, Burmanniales was included by Takhtajan in the 2009 revision of his system with the same family structure, as an order of superorder Lilianae (as the Liliiflorae were renamed).

=== Phylogeny ===
Historically the Burmanniales were considered the closest to the orchids, being epigynous with small seeds, although this was not supported when subjected to cladistic analysis, suggesting these characteristics were actually convergent. Phylogenetic analysis showed that Burmanniales was actually polyphyletic, resulting in a redistribution of the families between the Liliales and Dioscoreales orders. With the type family Burmanniaceae placed in Dioscoreales (together with Thismiaceae), the Burmanniales order became redundant and was discontinued.

=== Etymology ===
The name is derived by typification from the type genus Burmannia, named after the Dutch botanist Johannes Burman (1707–1779), followed by the suffix -iales, to indicate the rank of order.

== Bibliography ==
=== Books ===
- Blume, Carl Ludwig (1827–1830). Enumeratio plantarum Javae et insularum adjacentium : minus cognitarum vel novarum ex herbariis Reinwardtii, Kuhlii, Hasseltii et Blumii (in Latin). Leiden: van Leeuwen.
- Candolle, A. P. de (1813). Théorie élémentaire de la botanique, ou exposition des principes de la classification naturelle et de l'art de décrire et d'etudier les végétaux (in French).
- Dahlgren, R.M.; Clifford, H.T.; Yeo, P.F. (1985). The families of the monocotyledons: Structure, evolution and taxonomy. Berlin: Springer-Verlag. ISBN 978-3-642-64903-5.
- Heintze, August (1927). Cormofyternas Fylogeni (Phylogenie der cormophyten) (in German). Lund: Håkan Ohlssons boktryckeri.
- Hutchinson, John (1973). The families of flowering plants, arranged according to a new system based on their probable phylogeny. 2 vols (3rd ed.). Oxford University Press. ISBN 978-3-87429-160-6.
- Johri, B.M.; Ambegaokar, K.B.; Srivastava, P.S. (1992). Comparative embryology of angiosperms. Berlin: Springer-Verlag. ISBN 978-3-642-76395-3.
- Lawrence, George Hill Mathewson (1951). Taxonomy of vascular plants. New York: Macmillan.
- Lindley, John (1830). An introduction to the natural system of botany: or, A systematic view of the organisation, natural affinities, and geographical distribution, of the whole vegetable kingdom : together with the uses of the most important species in medicine, the arts, and rural or domestic economy. London: Longman.
- Martius, Karl Friedrich Philipp von (1835). Conspectus regni vegetabilis: secundum characteres morphologicos praesertim carpicos in classes ordines et familias digesti... (in Latin and German). Nuremberg: Schrag.
- Rudall, P.J.; Cribb, P.J.; Cutler, D.F.; Humphries, C.J., eds. (1995). Monocotyledons: systematics and evolution (Proceedings of the International Symposium on Monocotyledons: Systematics and Evolution, Kew 1993). Kew: Royal Botanic Gardens. ISBN 978-0-947643-85-0.
- Quattrocchi, Umberto (2000). CRC world dictionary of plant names: common names, scientific names, eponyms, synonyms, and etymology. Boca Raton, FL: CRC Press. ISBN 978-0-8493-2673-8.
- Takhtajan, Armen Leonovich (2009). Flowering Plants. Springer. ISBN 978-1-4020-9609-9.
- Wilson, K. L.; Morrison, D. A., eds. (2000). Monocots: Systematics and evolution (Proceedings of the Second International Conference on the Comparative Biology of the Monocotyledons, Sydney, Australia 1998). Collingwood, Australia: CSIRO. ISBN 978-0-643-06437-9. Excerpts

=== Chapters ===
- Rasmussen, F. N. Relationships of Burmanniales and Orchidales. pp. 227–241., in Rudall et al (1995)
- Rasmussen, Finn N (2000-05-19). Ins and Outs of orchid phylogeny. pp. 430–435. ISBN 978-0-643-09929-6., in Wilson & Morrison (2000)

=== Articles ===
- Chase, Mark W. (2004). "Monocot relationships: an overview". American Journal of Botany. 91 (10): 1645–1655. doi:10.3732/ajb.91.10.1645. PMID 21652314.
- Dahlgren, R. M. T. (February 1980). "A revised system of classification of the angiosperms". Botanical Journal of the Linnean Society. 80 (2): 91–124. doi:10.1111/j.1095-8339.1980.tb01661.x.
- Hoogland, Ruurd D.; Reveal, James L. (January 2005). "Index Nominum Familiarum Plantarum Vascularium". The Botanical Review. 71 (1): 1–291. doi:10.1663/0006-8101(2005)071[0001:INFPV]2.0.CO;2.
- Merckx, V.; Schols, P.; Kamer, H. M.-v. d.; Maas, P.; Huysmans, S.; Smets, E. (1 November 2006). "Phylogeny and evolution of Burmanniaceae (Dioscoreales) based on nuclear and mitochondrial data". American Journal of Botany. 93 (11): 1684–1698. doi:10.3732/ajb.93.11.1684. PMID 21642114.
- Neyland, Ray; Hennigan, Melissa (March 2003). "A phylogenetic analysis of large‐subunit (26S) ribosome DNA sequences suggests that the Corsiaceae are polyphyletic". New Zealand Journal of Botany. 41 (1): 1–11. doi:10.1080/0028825X.2003.9512828. S2CID 84392170.
- Neyland, Ray (February 2002). "A phylogeny inferred from large subunit (26S) ribosomal DNA sequences suggests that Burmanniales is polyphyletic". Australian Systematic Botany. 15 (1): 19–28. doi:10.1071/SB01001.
- Thorne, Robert F (1992). "Classification and geography of flowering plants". Botanical Review. 58 (3): 225–348. doi:10.1007/BF02858611. S2CID 40348158.

=== Websites ===
- ICN (2011). "International Code of Nomenclature for algae, fungi, and plants". Bratislava: International Association for Plant Taxonomy.
- Reveal, James L (5 Nov 1997). "Thorne System of Classification: Liliidae" (pbio 250 Lecture Notes). Plant Systematics. University of Maryland: Norton-Brown Herbarium.
- Reveal, James L (21 Sep 2005). "Latest NEWS on Vascular Plant Family Nomenclature". Plant systematics. University of Maryland: Norton-Brown Herbarium.
- Reveal, James L (1 Oct 2007). "Indices Nominum Supragenericorum Plantarum Vascularium". Plant systematics. University of Maryland: Norton-Brown Herbarium.
- Stevens, P.F. (2015) [2001], Angiosperm Phylogeny Website, Missouri Botanical Garden
