= August Heintze =

Swedish botanist (1881–1941)

- Born: 26 September 1881; Skurup, Sweden
- Died: 6 May 1941 (aged 59); Stockholm
- Education: Lund University
- Scientific career
- Fields: Botany
- Author abbrev. (botany): Heintze

(Sven) August Heintze (1881–1941) (sometimes spelled Heinze) was a Swedish botanist.

== Life ==
Heintze was born on 26 September 1881 to Fredrik and Kerstin (née Svensson) Heintze in Skurup, Skåne. He had a younger sister, Anna Maria (b. 1889). He enrolled as a student at Lund University in 1901. He graduated in 1906, and earned his doctorate in 1913. His first position was as a teacher at Uddevalla kommunalgymnasium. Heintze died on 6 May 1941 in Stockholm, and is buried in the Skurups Norra Kyrkogård ("Skurup's Northern Cemetery").

He is known for his work on the classification of cormophytes, particularly the family Ranuculaceae.

== Selected publications ==
Publications include:

- Heintze, August (1927). Cormofyternas Fylogeni (Phylogenie der cormophyten) (in Swedish). Lund: Håkan Ohlssons boktryckeri. (Cormofyt. Fylog.) (Abstract in German.)
- Heintze, August. (1932–1935) Handbuch der Verbreitungsökologie der Pflanzen. Stockholm, Selbstverlag (in German)
- Heintze, August. (1908) Växtgeografiska anteckningar från ett par färder genom Skibottendalen i Tromsö amt. Arkiv Bot. v 7 no 11 (in Swedish)
- Heintze, August. (1913) Växttopografiska undersökningar i Åsele Lappmarks fjälltrakter. I–II Arkiv Bot. v 12 no 11; v 13 no 5 (in Swedish)
- Heintze, August. (1909) Växtgeografiska undersökningar i Råne socken af Norrbottens län. Arkiv Bot. v 9 no 8 (in Swedish)

== Legacy ==
Published names include:

- Burmanniales Heintze, Cormofyt. Fylog.: 159 1927.
  - Burmanniidae Heintze, Cormofyt. Fylog.: 10. 1927.
- Marattiophyta Heintze, Cormofyt. Fylog.: 22. 1927.
- Orchididae Heintze, Cormofyt. Fylog.: 10. 1927.
- Oxalidales Heintze, Cormofyt. Fylog.: 13, 126 1927.
- Paeoniales Heintze, Cormofyt. Fylog.: 12. 1927
- Psilotophyta Heintze, Cormofyt. Fylog.: 22. 1927.
- Ranunculaceae subfam. Thalictroideae Heintze, Cormofyt. Fylog.: 103 1927.
  - Trolliinae Heintze, Cormfyt. Fylog.: 103. 1927

== Bibliography ==
- "Heintze, Sven August". Harvard University Herbaria & Libraries: Index of Botanists. 2015.
- Erdtman, Gunnar (1945). "August Heintze 26.9 1881-6.5 1941. Några minnesord" [A remembrance]. Svensk Bot. Tidskr. (in Swedish). 39 (4): 441–444.
- "Sven August Heintze". Geni. 2 March 2014.
- "Sven August Heintze". Gravar.se (in Swedish).
- Wieselgren, Oscar Harald, ed. (1946). Svenska män och kvinnor: biografisk uppslagsbok, Volume 3 (in Swedish). Stockholm: Bonnier.
- Krok, Thorgny Ossian Bolivar Napoleon; Aulin, Fredrik Rutger; Lindman, Carl Axel Magnus, eds. (1925). Bibliotheca botanica Suecana: ab antiquissimis temporibus ad finem anni MCMXVIII. Uppsala: Almqvist & Wiksell.
- "LIBRIS". National Library of Sweden.
- Kubitzki, Klaus; Bayer, Clemens, eds. (2003). The families and genera of vascular plants. Vol.5. Flowering plants. Dicotyledons: Malvales, Capparales and Non-betalain Caryophyllales. Berlin, Germany: Springer-Verlag. ISBN 978-3-662-07255-4.
- Kumazawa, Masao (1938). "Systematic and Phylogenetic Consideration of the Ranunculaceae and Berberidaceae". Shokubutsugaku Zasshi. 52 (613): 9–15. doi:10.15281/jplantres1887.52.9.
- Reveal, James L (20 July 2000). "Latest NEWS on Vascular Plant Family Nomenclature". Plant systematics. University of Maryland: Norton-Brown Herbarium. Archived from the original on May 31, 2022.
