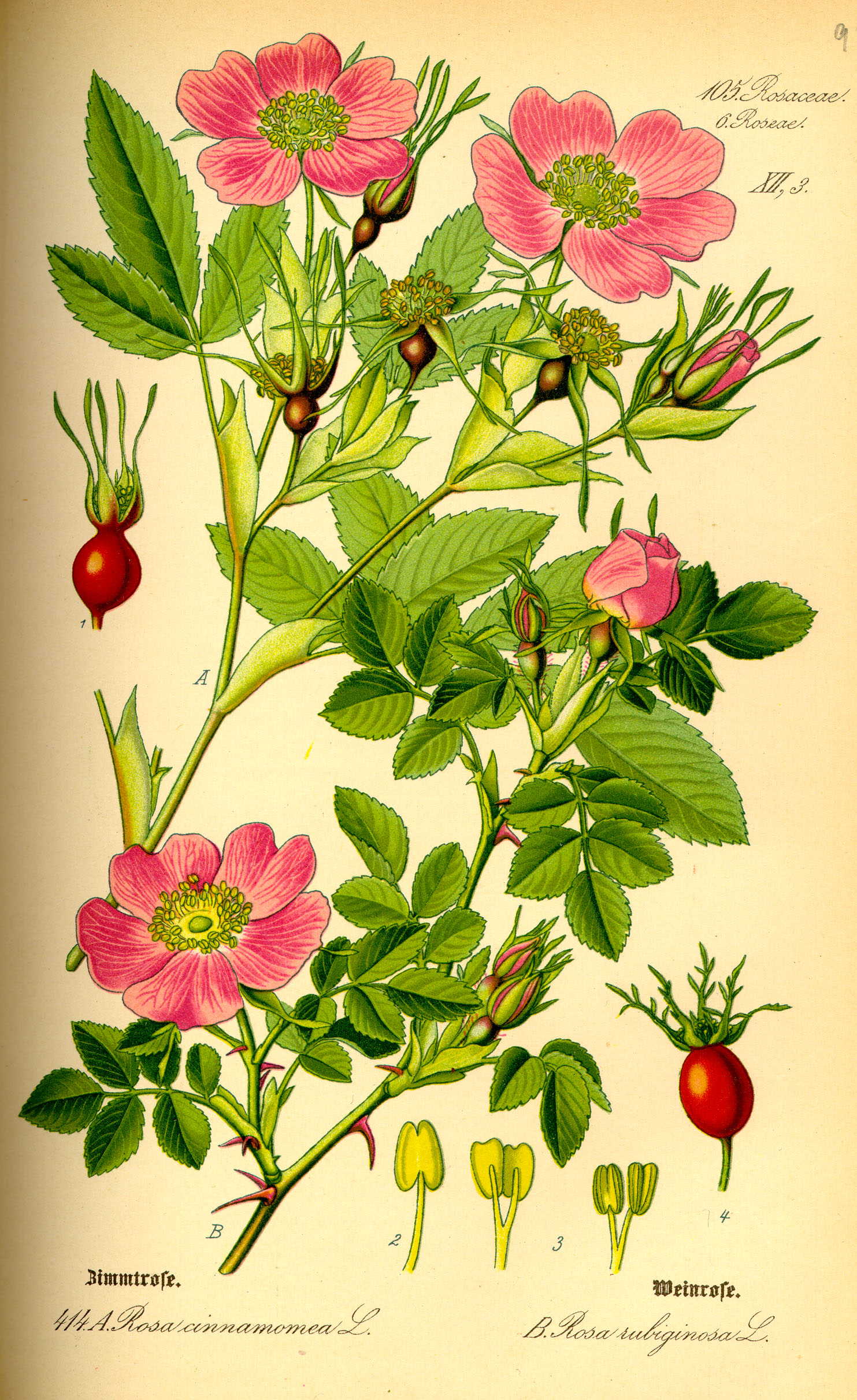
- Two rose plants, Rosa cinnamomea L. and R. rubiginosa L.

Scientific classification
- Kingdom: Plantae
- Clade: Tracheophytes
- Clade: Angiosperms
- Clade: Eudicots
- Clade: Rosids
- Clade: Fabids
- Order: Rosales; Bercht. & J.Presl

Families
- Barbeyaceae; Cannabaceae (hemp family); Dirachmaceae; Elaeagnaceae (oleaster/Russian olive family); Moraceae (mulberry family); Rhamnaceae (buckthorn family); Rosaceae (rose family); Ulmaceae (elm family); Urticaceae (nettle family)

Synonyms
- Rhamnales; Rosanae; Urticales

= Rosales =

Rosales Temporal range: Cenomanian - recent Possible Albian record

Order of flowering plants

Rosales (/roʊˈzeɪliːz/, roh-ZAY-leez) are an order of flowering plants. Well-known members of Rosales include: roses, strawberries, blackberries and raspberries, apples, cherries, pears, plums, peaches and apricots, almonds, rowan and hawthorn, jujube, elms, banyans, figs, mulberries, breadfruit, nettles, hops, and cannabis.

Rosales contain about 7,700 species, distributed into nine families and about 260 genera. Their type family is the rose family, Rosaceae. The largest families are Rosaceae (91/4828) and Urticaceae (53/2625).

== Taxonomy ==
The order Rosales is strongly supported as monophyletic in phylogenetic analyses of DNA sequences, such as those carried out by members of the Angiosperm Phylogeny Group. In their APG III system of plant classification, they defined Rosales as consisting of the nine families:

- Cannabaceae (hemp family)
- Dirachmaceae
- Elaeagnaceae (oleaster/Russian olive family)
- Moraceae (mulberry family)
- Rhamnaceae (buckthorn family)
- Rosaceae (rose family)
- Ulmaceae (elm family)
- Urticaceae (nettle family)

In the older classification system of Dahlgren the Rosales were in the superorder Rosiflorae (also called Rosanae). In the obsolete Cronquist system, the order Rosales was many times polyphyletic. It consisted of the family Rosaceae and 23 other families that are now placed in various other orders. These families and their placement in the APG III system are:

- Alseuosmiaceae (Asterales)
- Anisophylleaceae (Cucurbitales)
- Brunelliaceae (Oxalidales)
- Bruniaceae (Bruniales)
- Byblidaceae (Lamiales)
- Cephalotaceae (Oxalidales)
- Chrysobalanaceae (Malpighiales)
- Columelliaceae (Bruniales)
- Connaraceae (Oxalidales)
- Crassulaceae (Saxifragales)
- Crossosomataceae (Crossosomatales)
- Cunoniaceae (Oxalidales)
- Davidsoniaceae (Cunoniaceae, Oxalidales)
- Dialypetalanthaceae (Rubiaceae, Gentianales)
- Eucryphiaceae (Cunoniaceae, Oxalidales)
- Greyiaceae (Melianthaceae, Geraniales)
- Grossulariaceae (Saxifragales)
- Hydrangeaceae (Cornales)
- Neuradaceae (Malvales)
- Pittosporaceae (Apiales)
- Rhabdodendraceae (Caryophyllales)
- Rosaceae
- Saxifragaceae (Saxifragales)
- Surianaceae (Fabales)

== Phylogeny ==
The relationships of Rosales families were resolved in a molecular phylogenetic study based on two nuclear genes and ten chloroplast genes:

- Rosales
  - Rosaceae
  - - - Rhamnaceae
      - - Elaeagnaceae
        - - Barbeyaceae
          - Dirachmaceae
    - urticalean rosids
      - Ulmaceae
      - - Cannabaceae
        - - Moraceae
          - Urticaceae

The order Rosales is divided into three clades that have never been assigned a taxonomic rank. The basal clade consists of the family Rosaceae; another clade consists of four families, including Rhamnaceae; and the third clade consists of the four urticalean families.

The order is a sister to a clade consisting of Fagales and Cucurbitales.

== Distribution ==
Different plants that fall under the order Rosales grow in many different parts of the world. They can be found in the mountains, the tropics and the arctic. Even though you can find a member of the order Rosales nearly anywhere, the specific families grow in different specific geographical locations. Wind-pollination is the way that the majority of the families that fall under the order Rosales (including Moraceae, Ulmaceae, and Urticaceae etc.) pollinate.

== Importance ==
Within the order Rosales is the family Rosaceae, which includes numerous species that are cultivated for their fruit, making this one of the most economically important families of plants. Fruit produced by members of this family include apples, pears, plums, peaches, cherries, almonds, strawberries, blackberries and raspberries. Many ornamental species of plant are also in the family Rosaceae, including the rose after which the family and order were named. The rose, considered a symbol of love in many cultures, is featured prominently in poetry and literature. Modern garden varieties of roses such as hybrid teas, floribunda, and grandifora, originated from complex hybrids of several separate wild species native to different regions of Eurasia.

The Moraceae also produce important fruits, such as mulberries, figs, jackfruits, and breadfruits, and the leaves of the mulberry provide food for the silkworms used in commercial silk production.

The wood from the black cherry (Prunus serotina) and sweet cherry (P. avium) is used to make high quality furniture due to its color and ability to be bent. The Cannabis plant has been highly prized for millennia for its hemp, which has numerous uses. Other varieties of Cannabis are grown as a drug.

Plants in the order Rosales were used in the traditional medicines of many cultures. Medical cannabis has been recognized for its pharmaceutical use. The latex of some species of fig trees contains the enzyme ficin, which is effective in killing roundworms that infect the intestinal tracts of animals.
