= Melanthiales =

Extinct order of flowering plants

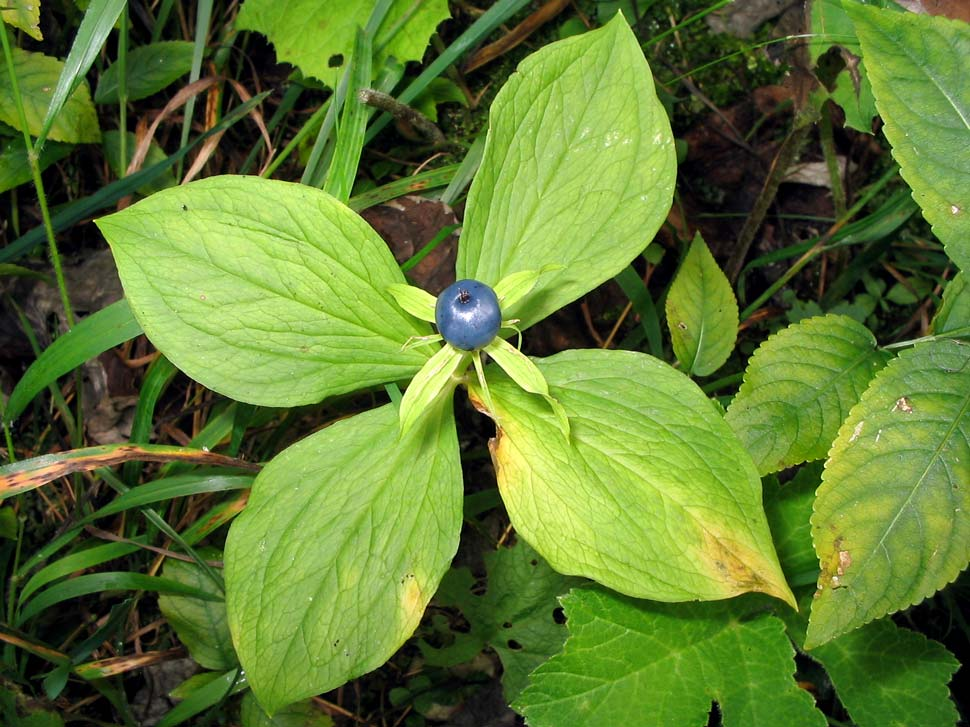

Melanthiales Link (melanthoid lilies) was an order of monocotyledons, whose name and botanical authority is derived by typification from the description of the type family, Melanthiaceae by Johann Heinrich Friedrich Link in 1829.

In Rolf Dahlgren's 1982 classification, he placed the Melanthiaceae in the Liliales order. In his 1985 revision he elevated the family to the order Melanthiales by taking two closely related genera, Campynemanthe and Campynemanthe from the Colchicaceae and creating the family Campynemaceae, (most other authors have preferred Campynemataceae), and then placing Melanthiaceae and Campynemaceae together to form Melanthiales sensu Dahlgren. In this circumscription Melanthiales was one of five orders belonging to the superorder Liliiflorae. Later, Melanthiales was included by Takhtajan in the 2009 revision of his system as an order of superorder Lilianae (as the Liliiflorae were renamed). Overall, the taxonomic history has been complex, and has included positioning this group as a subfamily (Melanthioideae) within the family Liliaceae sensu lato.

With the major reorganisation of the angiosperms that resulted from molecular phylogenetics, a "Melanthiaceae" and a "Campynemataceae" clade emerged as one of four major groups within Liliales, together with "Liliaceae" and "Colchicaceae". Consequently, these two families were then included in the order Liliales (lilioids) as separate families, and the order Melanthiales was discontinued. These transfers represent one of the few departures of the modern system from Dahlgren's radical reorganisation of the Lilianae superorder.

== See also ==
- Taxonomy of Liliaceae

== Bibliography ==
- Link, Johann Heinrich Friedrich (1829). Handbuch zur Erkennung der nutzbarsten und am häufigsten vorkommenden Gewächse (in German). Berlin: Haude und Spener.
- APG III (2009). "An Update of the Angiosperm Phylogeny Group classification for the orders and families of flowering plants: APG III". Botanical Journal of the Linnean Society. 161 (2): 105–121. doi:10.1111/j.1095-8339.2009.00996.x. hdl:10654/18083.
- Chase, Mark W. (2004). "Monocot relationships: an overview". American Journal of Botany. 91 (10): 1645–1655. doi:10.3732/ajb.91.10.1645. PMID 21652314.
- Goldblatt, P. The status of R. Dahlgren's orders Liliales and Melanthiales. pp. 181–200. In Rudall et al. (1995)
- Dahlgren, Rolf; Clifford, H. T. (1982). The monocotyledons: A comparative study. London and New York: Academic Press. ISBN 9780122006807.
- Dahlgren, R.M.; Clifford, H.T.; Yeo, P.F. (1985). The families of the monocotyledons. Berlin: Springer-Verlag. ISBN 978-3-642-64903-5.
- Rudall, P.J.; Cribb, P.J.; Cutler, D.F.; Humphries, C.J., eds. (1995). Monocotyledons: systematics and evolution (Proceedings of the International Symposium on Monocotyledons: Systematics and Evolution, Kew 1993). Kew: Royal Botanic Gardens. ISBN 978-0-947643-85-0.
- Rudall, P. J.; Stobart, K. L.; Hong, W-P.; Conran, J. G.; Furness, C. A.; Kite, G. C.; Chase, M. W. (2000-05-19). Consider the lilies: systematics of Liliales. pp. 347–359. ISBN 9780643099296. In Wilson & Morrison (2000)
- Zomlefer, Wendy B.; Williams, Norris H.; Whitten, W. Mark; Judd, Walter S. (September 2001). "Generic circumscription and relationships in the tribe Melanthieae (Liliales, Melanthiaceae), with emphasis on Zigadenus: evidence from ITS and trnL-F sequence data". American Journal of Botany. 88 (9): 1657–1669. doi:10.2307/3558411. JSTOR 3558411. PMID 21669700.
- Wilson, K. L.; Morrison, D. A., eds. (2000). Monocots: Systematics and evolution (Proceedings of the Second International Conference on the Comparative Biology of the Monocotyledons, Sydney, Australia 1998). Collingwood, Australia: CSIRO. ISBN 0-643-06437-0. Excerpts
- Takhtajan, Armen Leonovich (2009). Flowering Plants. Springer. ISBN 978-1-4020-9609-9.
