= Urticales =

Order of flowering plants

Urticales is an order of flowering plants. Before molecular phylogenetics became an important part of plant taxonomy, Urticales was recognized in many, perhaps even most, systems of plant classification, with some variations in circumscription. Among these is the Cronquist system (1981), which placed the order in the subclass Hamamelidae [sic], as comprising:

- Barbeyaceae
- Cannabaceae
- Cecropiaceae
- Moraceae
- Ulmaceae
- Urticaceae

In the APG III system (2009), the plants belonging to this order, along with four other families, constitute the order Rosales. Cecropiaceae is no longer recognized as separate from Urticaceae. The families Ulmaceae, Cannabaceae, Moraceae, and Urticaceae form a clade that has strong statistical support in phylogenetic analyses of DNA sequences. This clade has been informally called the urticalean rosids.

Urticalean rosids refers to the relationships amongst several families of angiosperms, and now includes more than 2,500 species.

The families are:

- Cannabaceae
- Moraceae
- Ulmaceae
- Urticaceae

The relationships within the "urticalean lineage" are now considered to be within the Rosales. The Moraceae and Urticaceae account for approximately 90% of the diversity within the clade.

Analysis of DNA samples in rbcL, trnL-F, and ndhF plastid regions suggests that Urticalean rosids are derived out of a lineage including Barbeyaceae, Dirachmaceae, Elaeagnaceae, and Rhamnaceae, with Rosaceae less closely related. The morphological and molecular characters which define "urticalean rosids" are:

- A dense gray tomentum comprising curly unicellular trichomes on abaxial leaf surfaces
- A reduced stamen count to one whorl or less
- Presence of inconspicuous flowers with up to five stamens
- Presence of two carpels
- A unilocular ovary with single apical ovule
- Urticoid teeth upon leaves
- Developed prophyllar buds between paired inflorescences

Urticalean families span a wide range of morphological features—deciduous or evergreen trees, vines, shrubs, annuals and some succulents. Leaves also vary though they tend to share brochidodromous or palmately pinnate venation, often associated with lobing or compounding in the leaf blade. Among Moraceae, Urticaceae and Cecropiaceae, mucilage cells and latex production is common. However, Cannabaceae and Ulmaceae do not produce this material despite the presence of laticifers.
