= Herbert Huber (botanist) =

German botanist

Herbert Franz Josef Huber (1 January 1931 – 1 October 2005) was a German botanist. At the time of his death in 2005 he was professor emeritus at the University of Kaiserslautern, Germany. He is known for his contributions to the classification of angiosperms.

== Life ==
He was the son of a biology professor at the Theological-Philosophical College at Dillingen, where he grew up. He studied under Hermann Merxmüller in Munich and completed a thesis there on Ceropegia in 1958. After graduating, he took up a position as curator at the Botanic Garden at the University of Würzburg, and from there he became professor of botany at the University of Mérida, Venezuela. On returning to Germany, he became chair of the Hamburg Herbarium, before taking up the position at Kaiserslautern, where he remained till retirement.

== Work ==
Huber was one of the first scientists to challenge the traditional division of angiosperms into monocotyledons and dicotyledons, on morphological grounds. He was also amongst the first taxonomists to suggest that the vast Liliaceae family be broken up into smaller family units. His contributions did not meet a wide audience outside of his own country since he mainly wrote in German, and published in the Mitteilungen der Botanischen Staatssammlung München.

It was at Munich that his most influential paper Die Samenmerkmale und Verwandtschaftsverhältnisse der Liliiflorae (1969) was written, a detailed study of the seeds of Liliiflorae and in particular the Liliaceae, in which he proposed splitting the family into two, the 'Asparagoid' Liliiflorae and the 'Colchicoid' Liliiflorae. Huber's narrower conception of families was an important stepping stone towards the eventual family structure produced by the Angiosperm Phylogeny Group. When Dahlgren and Clifford published their study of families of monocotyledons (1985), they developed and popularised Huber's concept, giving rise to the formation of a new order, the Asparagales. Other important work deals with the Rosiflorae (sensu Dahlgren), the classification of dicotyledons and seed anatomy.

== Legacy ==
The genus Hubera was named after him.

== Selected publications ==
- Huber, H. (1955) Ceropegia humbertii Mitt. Bot. Staatssamml. Munchen, Heft 12: 72.
- Huber, H. (1985) Annonaceae, pp. 1–75. In: Dassanayake, M.D. & Fosberg, F.R. (eds.), A revised handbook to the flora of Ceylon, 5. Amerind Publishing Co., New Delhi, 476 pp
- Huber, H (1969). "Die Samenmerkmale und Verwandtschaftsverhältnisse der Liliiflorae". Mitt. Bot. Staatssamml.[Mitteilungen der Botanischen Staatssammlung München]. 8: 219–538.
- Huber, H. (1977). "The treatment of monocotyledons in an evolutionary system of classification". In Kubitzki, Klaus (ed.). Flowering plants: Evolution and classification of higher categories. Symposium, Hamburg, September 8–12, 1976. Plant Systematics and Evolution. Vol. Supplementum 1. Wien: Springer. pp. 285–298. doi:10.1007/978-3-7091-7076-2_18. ISBN 978-3-211-81434-5.
- Kubitzki, Klaus; Huber, Herbert, eds. (1998). The families and genera of vascular plants. Vol.3. Berlin, Germany: Springer-Verlag. ISBN 978-3-540-64060-8.

== Bibliography ==
- "Huber, Herbert Franz Josef". Index of Botanists. Harvard University Herbaria & Libraries.
- Kubitzki, Klaus (February 2006). "Herbert Huber (1 Jan 1931–1 Oct 2005)". Taxon. 55 (1): 239. Bibcode:2006Taxon..55..239K. doi:10.1002/tax.551001.
- Chaowasku, Tanawat; Johnson, David M.; Van Der Ham, Raymond W.J.M.; Chatrou, Lars W. (2012). "Characterization of Hubera (Annonaceae), a new genus segregated from Polyalthia and allied to Miliusa" (PDF). Phytotaxa. 69 (1): 33–56. Bibcode:2012Phytx..69...33C. doi:10.11646/phytotaxa.69.1.6.
- Dahlgren, Rolf; Clifford, H. T. (1982). The monocotyledons: A comparative study. London and New York: Academic Press. ISBN 9780122006807.
- Dahlgren, R.M.; Clifford, H.T.; Yeo, P.F. (1985). The families of the monocotyledons. Berlin: Springer-Verlag. ISBN 978-3-642-64903-5.
