= Yōjirō =

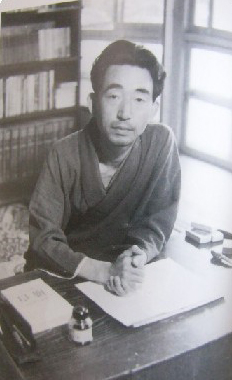
- Yojiro Ishizaka (1900–1986), Japanese novelist
- Pronunciation: joɯdʑiɾoɯ (IPA)
- Gender: Male

Origin
- Origin: Japanese
- Meaning: Different meanings depending on the kanji used

Other names
- Alternative spelling: Yoziro (Kunrei-shiki) Yoziro (Nihon-shiki) Yōjirō, Yojiro, Youjirou (Hepburn)

Yōjirō, Yojiro or Youjirou is a masculine Japanese given name.

== Written forms ==
Yōjirō can be written using different combinations of kanji characters. Some examples:

The characters used for "jiro" (二郎 or 次郎) literally means "second son" and usually used as a suffix to a masculine name, especially for the second child. The "yo" part of the name can use a variety of characters, each of which will change the meaning of the name ("洋" for ocean, "陽" for sunshine, "楊" and so on).

- 洋二郎, "ocean, second son"
- 洋次郎, "ocean, second son"
- 陽二郎, "sunshine, second son"
- 陽次郎, "sunshine, second son"
- 楊二郎, "willow, second son"
- 楊次郎, "willow, second son"
- 庸二郎, "common, second son"
- 庸次郎, "common, second son"

Other combinations...

- 洋治郎, "ocean, to manage/cure, son"
- 洋次朗, "ocean, next, clear"
- 陽治郎, "sunshine, to manage/cure, son"
- 陽次朗, "sunshine, next, clear"
- 曜次朗, "weekday, next, clear"

The name can also be written in hiragana ようじろう or katakana ヨウジロウ.

== Notable people with the name ==
- Yojiro Ishizaka (石坂 洋次郎, 1900–1986), influential and popular novelist of post-World War II Japan
- Yojiro Kimura (木村 陽二郎; 1912–2006), Japanese botanist
- Yojiro Noda (野田 洋次郎; born 1985), Japanese singer, songwriter, record producer and actor
- Yojiro Takahagi (髙萩 洋次郎, born 1986), Japanese football player currently playing for Sanfrecce Hiroshima
- Yojiro Takita (滝田 洋二郎, born 1955), Academy Award-winning Japanese filmmaker
- Yojiro Terada (寺田 陽次郎, born 1947), Japanese racing driver from Kobe, Hyogo Prefecture
- Yojiro Uetake (上武 洋次郎, born 1943), Japanese wrestler and Olympic champion in Freestyle wrestling
