= Vittorio Calestani =

Italian botanist (1882–1949)

- Born: 25 October 1882; Oneglia
- Died: 1949 (aged 66–67); Pisa
- Spouse: Emilia Mattioni
- Scientific career
- Fields: Botany
- Institutions: University of Modena
- Author abbrev. (botany): Calest.

Vittorio Emanuele Vincenzo Giuseppe Calestani (1882 – 1949) was an Italian botanist at the University of Modena, whose work included a classification system for angiosperms.

== Selected publications ==
=== Books ===
- Come si studiano le piante: manuale di botanica pratica (1932) Società Editrice "La Scuola", 733 pp.
- Origini della razza italiana: fondamenti della politica razzista (1941) Vol. 26 de Manuali di politica internazionale. Istituto per gli studi di politica internazionale, 298 pp.
- Natura in maschera: mimetismo e appariscenza negli animali e nelle piante (1947) Garzanti, 493 pp.

=== Other ===
- Contributo alla sistematica della Ombrellifere D'Europa (1905) Pubblicazione U. Martelli "Webbia"
- La vegetazione nei dintorni d' Orvieto (1907) Nuovo Gior. Bot. Ital. (14 ): 546-574
- Mimetismo vegetale (1947) Natura in mascliera, Milano, Garzanti

See also Taxon. Lit., ed. 2 (TL2), ICCU

== Legacy ==
Vittorio Calestani is the authority for 37 taxa, such as Arabis cardamine Calest.

== Bibliography ==
- "Calestani, Vittorio". Harvard University Herbaria & Libraries: Index of Botanists. 2015.
- Stafleu, Frans A.; Cowan, Richard S. (1976). "Calestani, Vittorio". Taxonomic literature : a selective guide to botanical publications and collections with dates, commentaries and types. Vol. 1. A–G (2nd ed.). Utrecht: Bohn, Scheltema & Holkema. p. 311.
- Dahlgren, Rolf; Clifford, H. T. (1982). The monocotyledons: A comparative study. London and New York: Academic Press. ISBN 9780122006807.
- Calestani, Vittorio (1933). "Le origini e la classificazione delle Angiosperme". Archo. Bot. Sist. Fito-Geogr. Genet. 9: 274–311.
- "Calestani, Vittorio". Catalogo del servizio bibliotecario nazionale. Istituto Centrale per il Catalogo Unico delle biblioteche italiane e per le informazioni bibliografiche. 2010. Archived from the original on 25 June 2012.
- "Tropicos". Missouri Botanical Garden. 2015.
