= Hypericum nagasawae =

Scientific classification
- Kingdom: Plantae
- Clade: Tracheophytes
- Clade: Angiosperms
- Clade: Eudicots
- Clade: Rosids
- Order: Malpighiales
- Family: Hypericaceae
- Genus: Hypericum
- Section: Hypericum sect. Humifusoideum
- Species: H. nagasawae

Binomial name
- Hypericum nagasawae Hayata

Synonyms
- Hypericum hayatae Y.Kimura

Species of flowering plant

Hypericum nagasawae is a species of the large genus Hypericum (St. John's wort) in the Hypericaceae family. It is native to Taiwan.

== Taxonomy ==
The species was described by Bunzō Hayata in 1911.
