= Yojiro Kimura =

Japanese botanist (1912–2006)

- Born: 1912
- Died: 2006 (aged 93–94)
- Scientific career
- Fields: Botany
- Author abbrev. (botany): Y.Kimura

Yojiro Kimura (木村 陽二郎, Kimura Yōjirō; 1912–2006) was a Japanese botanist, known for his classification of monocotyledons, and of Japanese species of Hypericum.

== Selected publications ==
- Kimura, Y. 1953. The system and phylogenetic tree of plants. J. Jpn. Bot. 28: 97–104.
- Kimura, Y. 1956. Système et phylogénie des monocotyledones. Notulae Systematicae, Herbier du Muséum de Paris 15:137–159.
- Kimura, Y. "Shokubutsu bunrui taikei no rekishi" [The History of Botanical Classification Systems] in "Seibutsugakushi ronshu" [Essays on The History of Biology]), (Yasaka Shobo, 1987).
- Kimura, Y. "Natsurarisuto no keifu", (Chuou Kouron Sha, Inc., 1983)

== Legacy ==
Yojiro Kimura is the authority for 58 taxa, such as Hypericum hayatae Y.Kimura

== Bibliography ==
- Kimura, Yojiro (1956). "Système et phylogénie des monocotyledones". Notulae Systematicae, Herbier du Muséum de Paris. 15: 137–159.
- "Kimura, Yojiro". Harvard University Herbaria & Libraries: Index of Botanists. 2015.
- "Tropicos". Missouri Botanical Garden. 2015.
- Dahlgren, Rolf; Clifford, H. T. (1982). The monocotyledons: A comparative study. London and New York: Academic Press. ISBN 9780122006807.
- Lam, HJ (2013) [1959], Taxonomy: general principles and angiosperms, pp. 3–75, ISBN 9781483153391
- Robson, Norman KB (2007). "Yojiro Kimura's Contribution to the Study of Japanese Hypericum". J. Jpn. Bot. 82 (2): 114. Archived from the original on 4 March 2016.
- Obituary: Dr. Yojiro Kimura (1912-2006). J. Jap. Bot. 82(2): 112. 2007 Archived 13 April 2016 at the Wayback Machine
- Kanai, Hiroo: In Memory of Dr. Yojiro Kimura. J. Jap. Bot. 82(2): 115. 2007 Archived 4 March 2016 at the Wayback Machine
