= Van der Werff =

Van der Werff, Van der Werf and Van de Werf are Dutch toponymic surnames, originally meaning "of the (ship)yard" or "of the wharf". Notable people with the surname include:

== Van der Werff ==
- Adriaen van der Werff (1659–1722), Dutch painter
- Aucke van der Werff (born 1953), Dutch politician
- Bo van der Werff (born 1992), Dutch speed skater
- Emily St. James, formerly VanDerWerff (born 1982), American critic, journalist, podcaster and author
- Henk van der Werff (born 1946), Dutch botanist
- Jonathan van der Werff (died 2026), British soldier and author
- Maikel van der Werff (born 1989), Dutch footballer
- Pieter van der Werff (1665–1722), Dutch painter
- Pieter Adriaansz. van der Werff (1529–1604), Dutch mayor during the Siege of Leiden

== Van der Werf ==
- Bo Van Der Werf (born 1969), Belgian jazz saxophonist
- Gerwin van der Werf (born 1969), Dutch writer
- Hanneke van der Werf (born 1984), Dutch politician
- Marieke van der Werf (born 1959), Dutch politician
- Stephanie Vander Werf (born 1986), Panamanian presenter, model and beauty pageant

== Van de Werf ==
- Frans Van de Werf (born 1950s), Belgian cardiologist

== See also ==
- Van de Werve
