= Oleaster =

Oleaster, signifying a plant like an olive, but less valuable (cf. poetaster), may be applied to:

- Feral olive trees that have been allowed to run wild
- Olea oleaster, the wild olive
- Various species of Elaeagnus, notably Elaeagnus angustifolia, the Russian olive, the dried fruits of which are eaten during Nowruz
