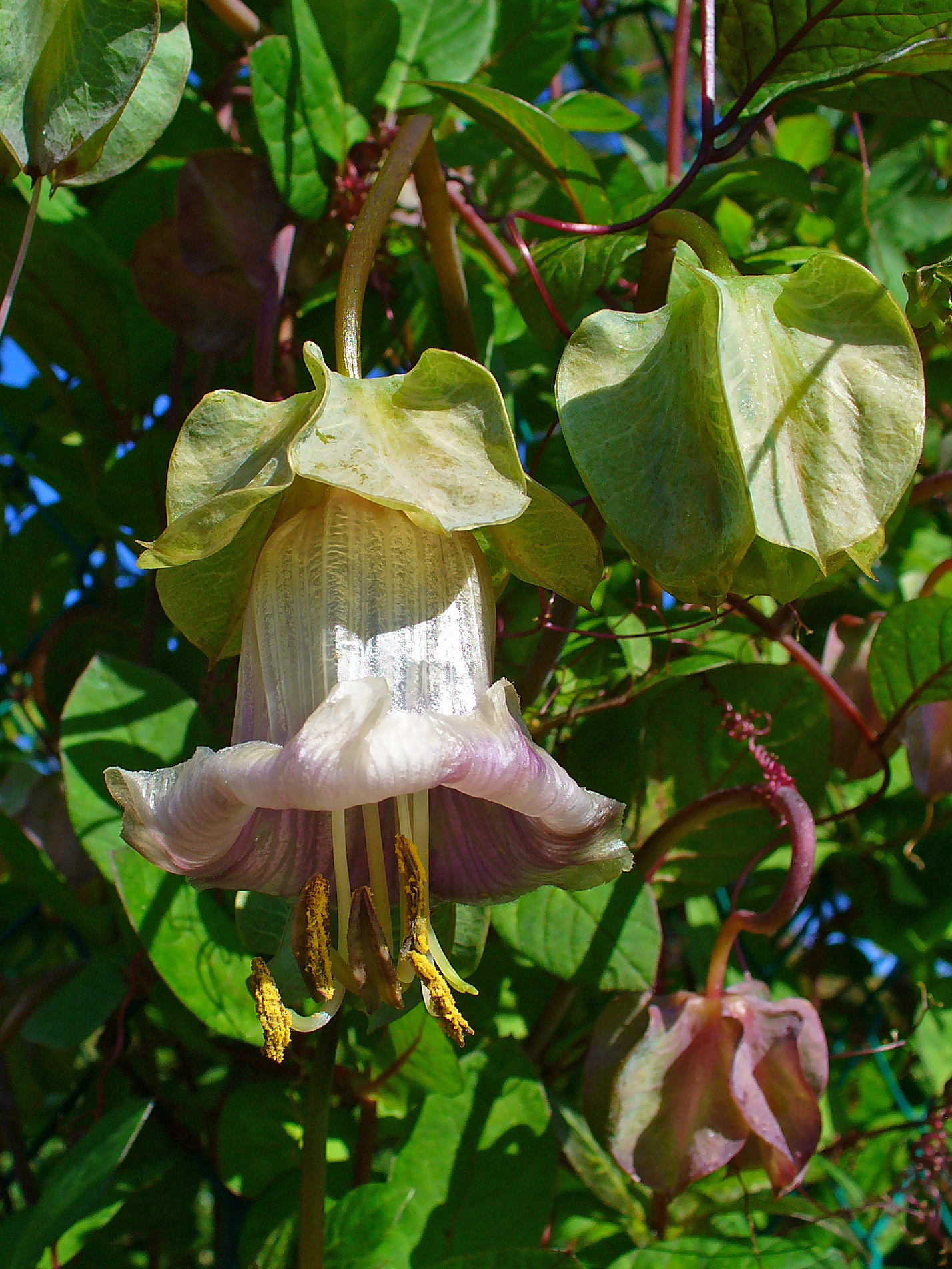
- Cobaea scandens

Scientific classification
- Kingdom: Plantae
- Clade: Tracheophytes
- Clade: Angiosperms
- Clade: Eudicots
- Clade: Asterids
- Order: Ericales
- Family: Polemoniaceae
- Subfamily: Cobaeoideae; Arnott

Genera
- Bonplandia Cav.; Cantua J.Juss. ex Lam.; Cobaea Cav.; Huthia Brand

= Cobaeoideae =

Subfamily of flowering plants

Cobaeoideae is a subfamily of the Polemoniaceae family of flowering plants. It is native to Baja California and tropical parts of the Americas.

It was formerly given family rank as Cobaeaceae, and placed in the Solanales.

The plants in this subfamily are mostly vines or small herbaceous trees with large showy flowers and winged seeds. They have compound leaves and three-celled pistils.
