= Tamaricales =

Order of dicotyledon plants

The Tamaricales are an order of dicotyledons in the Takhtajan system of plant classification. This order has been abandoned by more recent systems such as the APG system, and the two families in the order have been distributed to other orders:

- family Tamaricaceae, now in the Caryophyllales;
- family Frankeniaceae, also now in the Caryophyllales.
