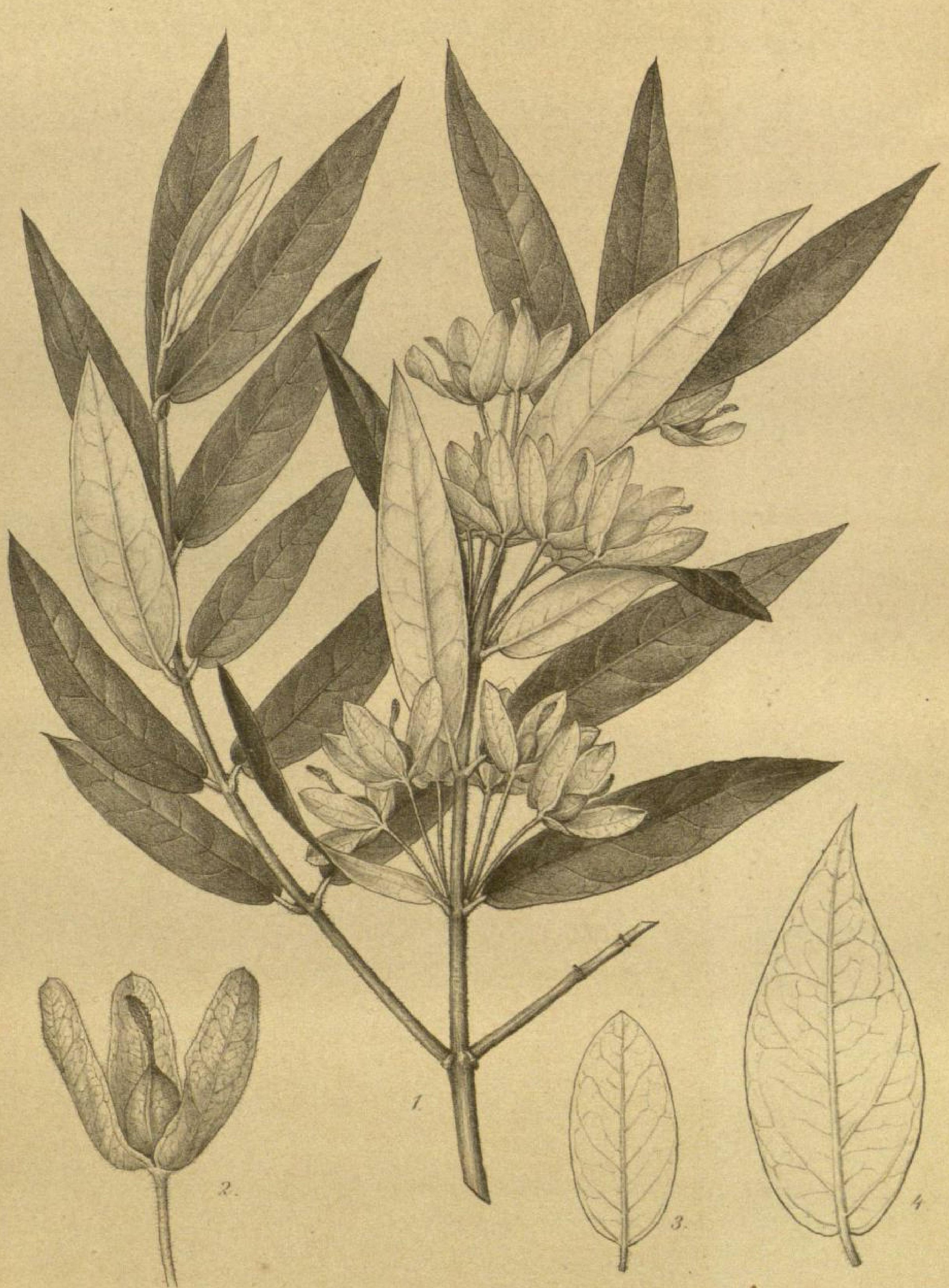

Scientific classification
- Kingdom: Plantae
- Clade: Tracheophytes
- Clade: Angiosperms
- Clade: Eudicots
- Clade: Rosids
- Order: Rosales
- Family: Barbeyaceae; Rendle
- Genus: Barbeya; Schweinf. ex Penzig
- Species: B. oleoides

Binomial name
- Barbeya oleoides Schweinf.

= Barbeya =

Genus of flowering plants

Barbeya is the only genus in the family Barbeyaceae, and has only one species, Barbeya oleoides. It is a small tree native to the mountains of Somalia, Ethiopia, and the Arabian Peninsula. It can be found locally abundant in the transition zone between the dry, evergreen, Afromontane forests and lower-elevation evergreen bushlands.

Barbeya oleoides has opposite, oblong-lanceolate, simple leaves with entire margins. Plants are dioecious, with male and female flowers on separate trees.

The family Barbeyaceae is closely related to its ecological associate on the Horn, the family Dirachmaceae. Evidence on the molecular level has demonstrated this despite obvious morphological differences between the two families such as Barbeya having small, unisexual, petalless flowers, while the flowers of Dirachmaceae are characterized by their bisexuality, and their relatively large petals (and size in general).
