= Gertrud Dahlgren =

Botanist (1931-2009)

- Born: 1931; Klippan
- Died: 2009 (78)
- Known for: Dahlgren system
- Spouse: Rolf Dahlgren
- Scientific career
- Fields: Systematic Botany
- Workplaces: University of Lund
- Author abbrev. (botany): G.Dahlgren

== Life ==
Gertrud Dahlgren (1931–2009) was a Swedish botanist. She was born at Klippan in Scania, and after graduating from university at Helsingborg went to the University of Lund for graduate studies. There she obtained her M.Sc. in chemistry and biology. She was married to fellow botanist Rolf Dahlgren (1932–1987), who was killed in a car accident. Gertrud Dahlgren had three children, Elisabet, Karin and Anders. She died in February 2009 at the age of 78.

== Career ==
At Lund, Gertrud Dahlgren pursued studies in systematic botany. Henning Weimarck, who held the chair in Systematic Botany, had initiated a new line of research in the mid-1950s, the field of biosystematics, which was to become Gertrud Dahlgren's chosen field, and to receive international attention. She achieved her Ph.D. in 1967 for her work on the genus Sanguisorba, and in particular two Swedish species, S. officinalis and S. minor. She was appointed to the position of Associate professor at Lund, and continued her work in biostematics, with especial interest in Ranunculus and Erodium, and editing a textbook on systematic botany, which was later translated into German. In 1979 she was appointed head of the department of Systematic Botany at Lund, a position she held till 1987 when, following the death of her husband, she turned to continuing his work on angiosperm taxonomy. In 1992 she was elected to the Kungliga Fysiografiska Sällskapet i Lund (Royal Physiographic Society in Lund).

== Selected publications ==
- Dahlgren, Gertrud; Cronberg, Nils (1996). "Species differentiation and relationships in Ranunculus subgenus Batrachium (Ranunculaceae) elucidated by isozyme electrophoresis". Symbolae Botanicae Upsaliensis. 31 (3): 91–104.
- Dahlgren, Gertrud, ed. (1976). Systematisk botanik [Systematische Botanik] (2nd ed.). Lund: LiberLäromedel. ISBN 9140039668.
- Dahlgren, Gertrud (July 1989). "An updated angiosperm classification". Botanical Journal of the Linnean Society. 100 (3): 197–203. doi:10.1111/j.1095-8339.1989.tb01717.x.
- 1989. The last Dahlgrenogram: System of classification of the dicotyledons. pp. 249–260, in K. Tan, R. R. Mill & T. S. Elias (eds.), Plant taxonomy, phytogeography and related subjects. Edinburgh University Press, Edinburgh.
- 1991. Steps toward a natural system of the Dicotyledons: Embryological characters. Aliso 13: 107–165.

== Bibliography ==
- "Dahlgren, Gertrud". Index of Botanists. Harvard University Herbaria & Libraries.
- van Wyk, A E (1987). "Obituary: Rolf Dahlgren (1932-1987)". Bothalia. 17 (2): 261–266. doi:10.4102/abc.v17i2.1041.
- Runemark, Hans; Björkqvist, Ingemar (16 December 2009). "Gertrud Dahlgren: Forskare i biosystematik. Docent Gertrud Dahlgren, 78 år, Lund, har avlidit. Hennes närmaste är tre barn med familjer". Sydsvenskan. Archived from the original on 6 March 2016.
