= Robert Folger Thorne =

American botanist (1920–2015)

- Born: July 13, 1920; Spring Lake, New Jersey, U.S.
- Died: March 24, 2015 (aged 94); California, U.S.
- Education: Dartmouth College (BA); Cornell University (MS, PhD)
- Spouse: Mae Zukel (m. 1947)
- Awards: Asa Gray Award
- Scientific career
- Fields: Botany
- Workplaces: Rancho Santa Ana Botanic Garden, Claremont Graduate University
- Author abbrev. (botany): Thorne

Robert F. Thorne (July 13, 1920 – March 24, 2015) was an American botanist. He was taxonomist and curator emeritus at Rancho Santa Ana Botanic Garden and professor emeritus at Claremont Graduate University in Claremont, California. His research has contributed to the understanding of the evolution of flowering plants.

== Life ==
Thorne was born on July 13, 1920, in Spring Lake, New Jersey. He was educated through high school in Gulfport and St. Petersburg, Florida. He graduated summa cum laude in 1941 with a major in botany from Dartmouth College and earned a M.S. degree in economic botany in 1942 at Cornell University. He spent about three years serving in the armed forces during World War II, first at Hondo Navigation School, Texas, graduating as a second lieutenant in aerial navigation in 1943. Then, after 7 months in Italy in 1944 as a B-24 bomber navigator with 40 missions over eastern and southern Europe, he served as an instructor and as an examinations officer at Ellington Field, Texas, from 1944 to 1945.

After serving in the armed forces, he earned his Ph.D. in economic botany at Cornell University in 1949, studying under professors Walter Muenscher and Arthur Eames. While at Cornell, he met and married Mae Zukel in 1947. Bob Thorne died on Tuesday, March 24, 2015, at the age of 94.

== Work ==
=== Rancho Santa Ana Botanic Garden ===
Thorne was the assistant professor of botany at the University of Iowa, Iowa City, Iowa, from 1949 to 1953, associate professor from 1954 to 1960, and professor from 1961 to 1962. He was a visiting professor at the University of Minnesota, Lake Itasca Biological Station in the summer of 1962 before moving to California, where he became taxonomist and curator for Rancho Santa Ana Botanic Garden and professor for Claremont Graduate School (now Claremont Graduate University) in Claremont, California. He became taxonomist and curator emeritus as well as professor emeritus at Rancho Santa Ana Botanic Garden and Claremont Graduate School in 1987. He also became curator emeritus of the Pomona College Herbarium in Claremont, California, from 1990 to the present.

Other appointments include: Field Botanist, U.S. Public Health Service, Georgia, Summer 1946. Botany Assistant, 1945–1947; Instructor in Botany, 1948–1949; Cornell University, Ithaca, New York. Visiting Associate Professor, University of Virginia, Mountain Lake Biological Station, Summer 1956.

Thorne became a Fulbright Research Scholar in 1959 and spent his time as a National Science Foundation senior postdoctoral fellow at the University of Queensland, Brisbane, Australia and studying the plant communities of New Caledonia, Australia, and New Guinea. When he moved to California in 1962, he quickly learned the flora of California, which led him to write the essay entitled "The vascular plant communities of California" in 1976. According to Systematic Botany, Thorne has advocated for "the conservation of California's endangered natural environments; his advocacy and leadership helped result in the conservation of Santa Catalina Island’s biota."

Thorne gained an international reputation through "his contributions to our understanding of the evolution of flowering plants... and that has culminated recently in two... publications, one outlining his classifications of monocots (Thorne 2000) and the other on the dicotyledons (Thorne 2001)." Thorne was a guide and teacher for the many staff, students, researchers, and visitors of Rancho Santa Ana Botanic Garden through the years. Among his projects was completing "floristic works on both the San Gabriel and San Bernardino mountains," a study of the flora of Sierra San Pedro Martir, and a checklist for the entire Baja peninsula.

=== Thorne system ===
Among Thorne's many accomplishments was a system of plant taxonomy known as the Thorne system, first issued in 1968, and periodically revised from 1976 onwards (1977, 1983, 1992, 1999, 2007).

=== Fellowships and awards ===
- Cramer Fellow (Dartmouth College to attend Cornell University, 1941; declined a second Cramer Fellowship in order to enter Army Air Forces).
- Research Associate Professor, University of Iowa, 1957.
- Fulbright Research Scholar, University of Queensland, Brisbane, Australia, 1959–1960 (renewed once).
- National Science Foundation Senior Postdoctoral Fellow, University of Queensland, Brisbane, Australia; Royal Botanic Gardens, Kew, and British Museum (Natural History), London, England, 1960.
- Elected Foreign Member, Royal Danish Academy of Sciences and Letters, 1986–present.
- Merit Award, American Botanical Society, 1996.
- Madroño, Volume 45, 1999. Dedicated to Robert F. Thorne.

=== Special recognition ===
- 1996. Universidad Autónoma de Baja California, Ensenada. For botanical contributions in Baja California
- 1998. Santa Catalina Island Conservancy. For botanical contributions to Santa Catalina Island
- 1999. Southern California Botanists. For botanical contributions in California
- 1999. Southern California Botanists. Lifetime Achievement Award
- 2000. University Club of Claremont, California
- 2001. American Society of Plant Taxonomists. Asa Gray Award for outstanding contributions in systematic botany
- 2003. Third International Conference of the Comparative Biology of Monocotyledons. Lifetime Achievement Award
- 2005. Rancho Santa Ana Botanic Garden. Dedication honoring lifetime achievements as systematist and conservationist
- 2006. Rancho Santa Ana Botanic Garden. California Glory Award acknowledging outstanding contributions toward understanding and preservation of California's native flora
- 2006. Botanical Society of America. Centennial Award for exemplary services to the plant sciences

=== Professional service ===
Active via elective and appointed offices in service to several professional societies:

- President, American Society of Plant Taxonomists, 1968.
- Secretary, Botanical Society of America, ca. 1958.
- President, Southern California Botanists, ca. 1966.
- Second vice-president, California Botanical Society, ca. 1966.
- National treasurer, Gamma Alpha scientific fraternity, 1954–1957.
- Chairman, advisory council of Flora North America Project, which found the project feasible.
- On the editorial boards of several national botanical journals; international journal Taiwania.
- Reviewer of manuscripts for various botanical journals and university presses.

== Selected publications ==
- Thorne, R.F. (1968). "Synopsis of a putative phylogenetic classification of flowering plants". Aliso. 6 (4): 57–66. doi:10.5642/aliso.19680604.06.
- Thorne, Robert F (1976). "A Phylogenetic Classification of the Angiospermae". Evolutionary Biology. Vol. 9. pp. 35–106. doi:10.1007/978-1-4615-6950-3_2. ISBN 978-1-4615-6952-7. PMC 2645363. PMID 19208237.
- Thorne, Robert F (1977). "Some Realignments in the Angiospermae". In Kubitzki, Klaus (ed.). Flowering Plants: Evolution and Classification of Higher Categories Symposium, Hamburg, September 8–12, 1976. Plant Systematics and Evolution. Vol. Supplement 1. Vienna: Springer. pp. 299–319. doi:10.1007/978-3-7091-7076-2_19. ISBN 978-3-211-81434-5.
- Thorne, Robert F. (February 1983). "Proposed new realignments in the angiosperms". Nordic Journal of Botany. 3 (1): 85–117. Bibcode:1983NorJB...3...85T. doi:10.1111/j.1756-1051.1983.tb01447.x.
- 1986. Thorne, R. F. Antarctic elements in Australasian rainforests. Telopea 2(6): 611–617.
- Thorne, Robert F (1992a). "Classification and geography of flowering plants". Botanical Review. 58 (3): 225–348. Bibcode:1992BotRv..58..225T. doi:10.1007/BF02858611. JSTOR 4354190. S2CID 40348158.
- Thorne, Robert F (1992b). "An updated phylogenetic classification of the flowering plants". Aliso. 13 (2): 365–389. doi:10.5642/aliso.19921302.08.
- 1994. Krantz, T. P. and R. F. Thorne. An annotated flora of the vascular plants of the San Bernardino Mountains. (Appendix I: Krantz. A phytogeography of the San Bernardino Mountains, San Bernardino County, California. Ph.D. Thesis, Univ. of Calif., Berkeley. 1994)
- 1995. Thorne, R. F. Vascular plants of Fort DeSoto Park, Pinellas County, Florida. Selbyana 16(1): 100–109.
- 1999. Thorne, R. F. Eastern Asia as a living museum for archaic angiosperms and other seed plants. Taiwania 44(4): 413–422.
- 2000. Thorne, R. F. The classification and geography of the monocotyledon subclasses Alismatidae, Liliidae and Commelinidae, pp. 75–124. In B. Nordenstam, G. E-Ghazaly, and M. Kassas [eds.], Plant Systematics for the 21st Century. Portland Press, London, UK.
- 2001. Thorne, R. F. The classification and geography of the flowering plants: dicotyledons of the class Angiospermae (subclasses Magnoliidae, Ranunculidae, Caryophyllidae, Dilleniidae, Rosidae, Asteridae, and Lamiidae). Botanical Revue 66(4): 44l–647.
- 2002. Thorne, R. F. How many species of seed plants are there? Taxon 51: 511–512.
- 2006. Thorne, R. F. A bibliography of floristics in southern California: addendum number 2A. Crossosoma 31(2), Fall–Winter 2005 (issued 2006).
- Thorne, Robert F.; Reveal, James L. (April 2007). "An Updated Classification of the Class Magnoliopsida ("Angiospermae")". The Botanical Review. 73 (2): 67–181. doi:10.1663/0006-8101(2007)73[67:AUCOTC]2.0.CO;2. S2CID 24415895.
- 2007. Thorne, R. F. et al. Transmontane coniferous vegetation, pp. 575–586. In M. G. Barbour. T. Keeler.-Wolf and A. A. Schoenherr [eds.], Terrestrial Vegetation of California, 3rd ed., University of California Press, Berkeley, CA.
- 2010. Thorne, R. F, R. V. Moran and R. A. Minnich. 2010. Vascular plants of the high Sierra San Pedro Mártir, Baja California, Mexico: an annotated checklist. Aliso (28): 1–57.

== Bibliography ==
- Reveal, James L (29 March 1999a). "An updated classification of the Monocotyledoneae by Robert F Thorne". Plant Biology. University of Maryland: Norton-Brown Herbarium. Archived from the original on 13 February 2021.
