= Klaus Kubitzki =

German botanist and taxonomist (1933–2022)

- Born: 3 May 1933; Niesky, Upper Lusatia
- Died: 5 December 2022 (aged 89); Hamburg
- Education: Kiel University
- Known for: Kubitzki system
- Scientific career
- Fields: Botany
- Workplaces: University of Hamburg
- Author abbrev. (botany): Kubitzki

Klaus Kubitzki (3 May 1933 – 5 December 2022) was a German botanist. He was Emeritus professor at the University of Hamburg, at the Herbarium Hamburgense. He is known for his work on the systematics and biogeography of the angiosperms, particularly those of the Neotropics, and also the floristic record of the Tertiary era. His plant systematic work is referred to as the Kubitzki system. He was a member of the American Society of Plant Taxonomists.

== Career ==
Kubitzki was born in Niesky, Germany, and studied biology and geology at the University of Innsbruck, the University of Göttingen, and Kiel University. His doctoral work at Kiel was in Quaternary studies (1960). He then became an associate professor at the Universidad Austral de Chile in Valdivia, southern Chile (1961–1963). He pursued further studies at the University of Münster (1968), from where he proceeded to a position as lecturer at LMU Munich till 1973, and then as professor of systematic botany at the University of Hamburg (1973 to 1998).

== Death ==
Kubitzki died on 5 December 2022, near Hamburg aged 89.

== Work ==
Kubitzki's contributions have included taxonomy, plant geography and geo-ecology. He made a special study of the Guayana Highland. His taxonomic work is contained in The Families and Genera of Vascular Plants (1990-).

== Selected publications ==
- Carlos Toledo Rizzini, Klaus Kubitzki, Ghillean t. Prance. 1982a. Lorenthaceae. Volumes 2 & 4 of Flora de Venezuela. Inst. Botanico
- Klaus Kubitzki, Susanne S. Renner. 1982b. Lauraceae I (Aniba & Aiouea). No. 31 of Flora neotropica monograph. Volume 1 de Lauraceae. New York Botanical Garden, 125 pp. ISBN 0-89327-244-2
- Kubitzki, Klaus, ed. (1977). Flowering Plants : Evolution and classification of higher categories. Symposium, Hamburg, September 8–12, 1976. Plant Systematics & Evolution - Supplementum 1. Wien: Springer. p. 416. ISBN 978-3-211-81434-5.

=== The Families and Genera of Vascular Plants (Springer-Verlag, Berlin) ===
- Kramer, K.U.; Green, P., eds. (1990). Pteridophytes and gymnosperms. Vol. 1. ISBN 3-540-51794-4.
- Kubitzki, Klaus; Rohwer, Jens G.; Bittrich, Volker, eds. (1993). The Families and Genera of Vascular Plants. II Flowering plants - Dicotyledons. Magnoliid, Hamamelid and Caryophyllid families. Berlin: Springer. ISBN 3-540-55509-9.
- Kubitzki, Klaus; Huber, Herbert, eds. (1998). Flowering plants. Monocotyledons: Lilianae (except Orchidaceae). The families and genera of vascular plants. Vol. 3. Berlin: Springer-Verlag. ISBN 3-540-64060-6.
- Kubitzki, Klaus, ed. (1998). Flowering Plants. Monocotyledons: Alismatanae and Commelinanae (except Gramineae). The families and genera of vascular plants. Vol. IV. Berlin Heidelberg: Springer Science & Business Media. doi:10.1007/978-3-662-03531-3. ISBN 978-3-662-03531-3. S2CID 39472817.
- Kubitzki, Klaus; Bayer, Clemens, eds. (2003). Flowering plants. Dicotyledons: Malvales, Capparales and Non-betalain Caryophyllales. The families and genera of vascular plants. Vol. 5. Berlin, Germany: Springer-Verlag. ISBN 978-3-662-07255-4.
- Kubitzki, K., ed. (2004). Celastrales, Oxalidales, Rosales, Cornales, Ericales. Vol. VI. Springer-Verlag. doi:10.1007/978-3-662-07257-8. ISBN 978-3-662-07257-8. S2CID 12809916.
- Kadereit, Joachim W., ed. (2004). Lamiales (except Acanthaceae including Avicenniaceae). Springer. ISBN 3-540-40593-3.
- Kadereit, Joachim W.; Jeffrey, Charles, eds. (2007). Asterales. The Families and Genera of Vascular Plants, Klaus Kubitzki (ed.). Vol. VIII: Eudicots. Berlin: Springer-Verlag. ISBN 978-3-540-31051-8.(see publisher information)
- Kubitzki, Klaus, ed. (2007). Berberidopsidales, Buxales, Crossosomatales, Fabales p.p., Geraniales, Gunnerales, Myrtales p.p., Proteales, Saxifragales, Vitales, Zygophyllales, Clusiaceae Alliance, Passifloraceae Alliance, Dilleniaceae, Huaceae, Picramniaceae, Sabiaceae. Springer. ISBN 978-3-540-32214-6.
- Kubitzki, Klaus, ed. (2011). Flowering Plants. Eudicots: Sapindales, Cucurbitales, Myrtaceae. The families and genera of vascular plants. Vol. X. Springer Science & Business Media. ISBN 978-3-642-14397-7.
- Kubitzki, Klaus, ed. (2013). Flowering Plants. 11 Eudicots: Malpighiales. Springer Science & Business Media. ISBN 978-3-642-39417-1.(Also preview at Springer)
- Kuijt, Job; Hansen, Bertel, eds. (2015). Santalales, Balanophorales. ISBN 978-3-319-09296-6.
- Kellogg, Elizabeth A., ed. (2015). Poaceae. ISBN 978-3-319-15331-5.
- Kadereit, Joachim W.; Bittrich, Volker, eds. (2016). Flowering Plants. Eudicots: Aquifoliales, Boraginales, Bruniales, Dipsacales, Escalloniales, Garryales, Paracryphiales, Solanales (except Convolvulaceae), Icacinaceae, Metteniusaceae, Vahliaceae. Springer. ISBN 978-3-319-28534-4.

== Eponyms ==
Genus

- (Lauraceae) Kubitzkia van der Werff

Species

- (Asteraceae) Mikania kubitzkii R.M.King & H.Rob.
- (Dilleniaceae) Davilla kubitzkii Aymard

== See also ==
- Kubitzki system
