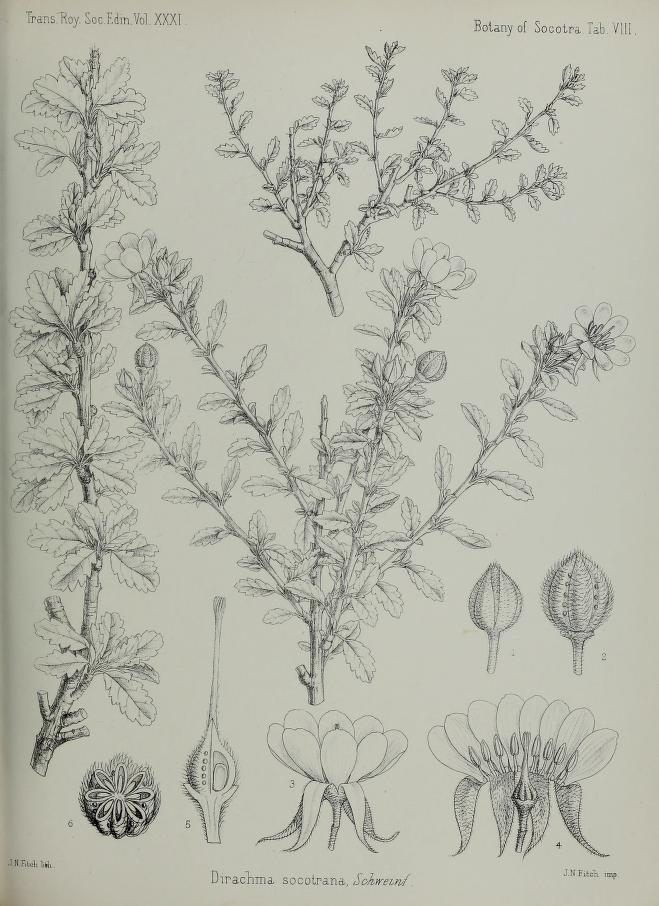
- Illustration depicting the woody species Dirachma socotrana

Scientific classification
- Kingdom: Plantae
- Clade: Tracheophytes
- Clade: Angiosperms
- Clade: Eudicots
- Clade: Rosids
- Order: Rosales
- Family: Dirachmaceae; Hutch.
- Genus: Dirachma; Schweinf. ex Balf.f.

Species
- Dirachma socotrana; Dirachma somalensis
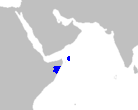
- Distribution of genus Dirachma

= Dirachma =

Genus of flowering plants

Dirachma is the sole genus of the family Dirachmaceae. The genus had been monotypic, its sole species being the woody plant Dirachma socotrana, until a second, herbaceous, species, Dirachma somalensis, was discovered in Somalia and described in 1991.
