= James L. Reveal =

20th century American botanist known for contributions to taxonomy

James Lauritz Reveal
- Botanist James L. Reveal, August 23, 2009
- Born: March 29, 1941; Reno, Nevada
- Died: January 9, 2015 (aged 73); Ithaca, New York
- Education: Utah State University
- Scientific career
- Fields: Botany
- Workplaces: University of Maryland
- Author abbrev. (botany): Reveal

James Lauritz Reveal (March 29, 1941 – January 9, 2015) was a U.S. botanist best known for his contributions to the genus Eriogonum and for his work on suprageneric names. His website, at PlantSystematics.org, also presents material on plant taxonomy including the Reveal system. He published extensively on North American flora, was a member of the Angiosperm Phylogeny Group, and was one of the authors of the APG II and APG III classifications.

At the time of his death, Reveal was a professor emeritus at the University of Maryland, adjunct professor at Cornell University's Department of Plant Biology and honorary curator at the New York Botanical Garden.

== Biography ==
=== Early life and education ===
James Lauritz Reveal was born on March 29, 1941, in Reno, Nevada to Arlene Hadfield Reveal and Jack Lilburn Reveal (1912-1988), a librarian and a forester/botanist, respectively. Reveal attended Utah State University (B.S. 1964, M.S. 1966) and received his Ph.D. from Brigham Young University in 1969. He held a post-doctoral fellowship with the Smithsonian Institution from 1967 to 1969.

=== Career ===
In 1969, Reveal joined the Botany faculty at the University of Maryland, serving as director of the Norton-Brown Herbarium of the University of Maryland between 1979 and 1999. During his tenure, the Norton-Brown Herbarium amassed one of the greatest collections of Polygonaceae subfam. Eriogonoideae in the world.

Reveal's research interests included botanical studies in the American West, especially endangered and threatened species. He studied the history of botanical exploration in the New World and botanical nomenclature and taxonomy as well, with much of his research and writing devoted to the Polygonaceae subfamily Eriogonoideae, commonly known as the wild buckwheats. His interest in combining history and botany led to projects on botanical history of colonial Maryland and on the botanical discoveries of the Lewis and Clark Expedition, about which he wrote several books and articles. A prolific collector, author, and speaker, Reveal collected more than 9,000 plant specimens from North America, Central America, and China, and published over 500 papers; he presented more than 100 invited talks.

As a member of the Smithsonian Institution's Endangered Species Committee (1974-1982), Reveal was instrumental in attaining the addition of endangered plant species to the original Endangered Species Act.

Reveal discovered or identified over fifty plant varieties, most of these discoveries being flowering plants of the American Southwest. In 1968, Reveal identified five new plant varieties at a Nevada nuclear testing site. In 1981, Reveal and Norlyn James Bodkin, then professor of Botany at James Madison University, identified a new lily variety, the first new plant discovery along the eastern U.S. seaboard since the 1940s. They named the new variety of Virginia Wake Robin Trillium pusillum var. monticulum (Shenandoah Wake Robin).

In 1978, Reveal married his University of Maryland colleague, the botanist C. Rose Broome (later with the Agricultural Research Service of the U.S. Department of Agriculture). They collaborated on many research projects, most notably the botanical studies of colonial Maryland and explorations in Mexico that identified two new plant varieties. Reveal helped document the flora of Maryland and the Mid-Atlantic and assisted in Broome's 1979 publication of the first checklist of Rare and Endangered Vascular Plant Species in Maryland.

In 1992, Reveal's illustrated Gentle Conquest: The Botanical Discovery of North America was published. Gentle Conquest encompasses the history of botanical exploration in the New World from the first settlement to the end of the Western frontier.

Reveal retired from the Botany Department at the University of Maryland in 1999, but remained active, holding emeritus appointments including Honorary Curator of the New York Botanical Garden (2003-2015) and adjunct professor at Cornell University (2007-2015), working on the Intermountain Flora project and collecting plant specimens throughout several Western U.S. states, including California, Colorado, and Nevada. He made numerous contributions to the website, Discovering Lewis & Clark.

In 2009, Reveal received the North American Rock Garden Society's Edgar T. Wherry award for his contributions to the genus Eriogonum. Reveal died on January 9, 2015, in Ithaca, New York.

== Reveal system ==
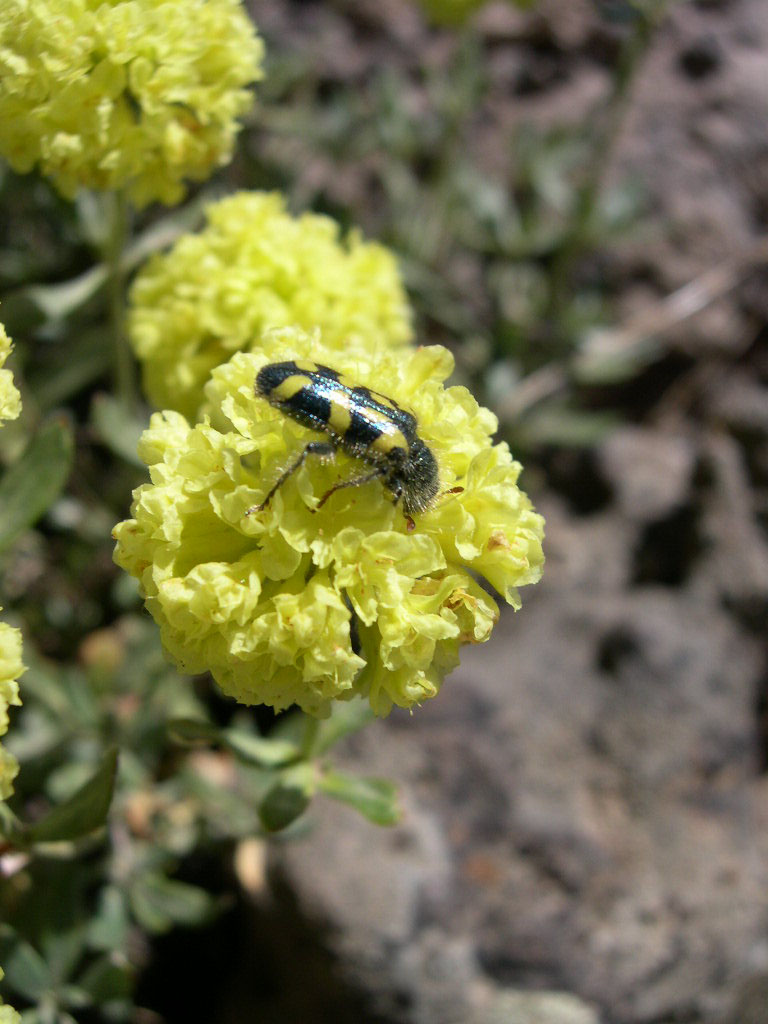
Eriogonum – a genus of wild buckwheats native to North America James Reveal worked on his entire life.

Reveal made major contributions to the systematic taxonomy of the flowering plants. in 1997 he published his own system of classification online in ten parts as lecture notes comparing the major systems in use at that time, but without accompanying rationale.

Following this Reveal became an author with the consensus Angiosperm Phylogeny Group (APG) on the APG II 2003 and APG III 2009 processes. Although this largely supplanted the earlier and competing systems, he collaborated with Robert Thorne on his system (2007), and subsequently continued to develop his own system.

== Legacy ==
Reveal made major contributions to the systematics of Polygonaceae subfamily Eriogonoideae, and other families. For his many contributions to botany, seven species and one genus have been named in his honor (patronyms).

- Castilleja revealii N. H. Holmgren (Orobanchaceae)
- Eriogonum revealianum S. L. Welsh (=E. corymbosum var. revealianum (S. L. Welsh) Reveal)(Polygonaceae)
- Montanoa revealii H. Rob. (Asteraceae)
- Rumfordia reveallii H. Rob. (Asteraceae)
- Koanophyllon revealii Turner (Asteraceae)
- Cupressus revealiana (Silba) Bisbee (Cupressaceae)
- Oreocarya revealii W. A. Weber & R. C. Witmann (Boraginaceae)
- Revealia R. M. King & H. Rob. (Asteraceae)

== Selected publications ==
See C.V.

- Reveal, J.L. (23 April 2012b). "An outline of a classification scheme for extant flowering plants" (PDF). Phytoneuron. 2012 (37): 1–221.
- Reveal, J.L. (9 April 2012a). "Newly required infrafamilial names mandated by changes in the Code of nomenclature for algae, fungi and plants" (PDF). Phytoneuron. 2012 (33): 1–32.
- Reveal, J.L. (2011b). "New ordinal names established by changes to the botanical code" (PDF). Phytotaxa. 30 (1): 42–44. Bibcode:2011Phytx..30...42R. doi:10.11646/phytotaxa.30.1.2.
- Reveal, J.L.; Chase, M.W. (2011). "APG III: Bibliographical Information and Synonymy of Magnoliidae" (PDF). Phytotaxa. 19 (1): 71–134. Bibcode:2011Phytx..19...71R. doi:10.11646/phytotaxa.19.1.4.
- Reveal, James L. (30 April 2011a). "Summary of recent systems of angiosperm classification". Kew Bulletin. 66 (1): 5–48. Bibcode:2011KewBu..66....5R. doi:10.1007/s12225-011-9259-y. S2CID 44982192.
- Reveal, James L. (18 June 2010). "A checklist of familial and suprafamilial names for extant vascular plants". Phytotaxa. 6: 1–402. doi:10.11646/phytotaxa.6.1.1.
- Chase, Mark W; Reveal, James L (2009). "A phylogenetic classification of the land plants to accompany APG III". Botanical Journal of the Linnean Society. 161 (2): 122–127. doi:10.1111/j.1095-8339.2009.01002.x.
- Angiosperm Phylogeny Group III (2009), "An update of the Angiosperm Phylogeny Group classification for the orders and families of flowering plants: APG III", Botanical Journal of the Linnean Society, 161 (2), Bremer, B., K. Bremer, M.W. Chase, M.F. Fay, J.L. Reveal, D.E. Soltis, P.S. Soltis & P.F. Stevens: 105–121, doi:10.1111/j.1095-8339.2009.00996.x, hdl:10654/18083
- Chase, M.W., J.L. Reveal & M.F. Fay. 2009. A subfamilial classification for the expanded asparagalean families Amaryllidaceae, Asparagaceae and Xanthorrhoeaceae . Bot. J. Linn. Soc. 161: 132–136.
- Doweld, A. & J.L. Reveal. 2008. New suprageneric names for vascular plants. Phytologia 90: 416–417.
- Thorne, Robert F.; Reveal, James L. (April 2007). "An Updated Classification of the Class Magnoliopsida ("Angiospermae")". The Botanical Review. 73 (2): 67–181. doi:10.1663/0006-8101(2007)73[67:AUCOTC]2.0.CO;2.
- Hoogland, Ruurd D.; Reveal, James L. (January 2005). "Index Nominum Familiarum Plantarum Vascularium". The Botanical Review. 71 (1): 1–291. doi:10.1663/0006-8101(2005)071[0001:INFPV]2.0.CO;2. JSTOR 4354495.
- Angiosperm Phylogeny Group II (2003), "An update of the Angiosperm Phylogeny Group classification for the orders and families of flowering plants: APG II", Botanical Journal of the Linnean Society, 141 (4), Bremer, B., K. Bremer, M.W. Chase, J.L. Reveal, D.E. Soltis, P.S. Soltis & P.F. Stevens: 399–436, doi:10.1046/j.1095-8339.2003.t01-1-00158.x
- Reveal, J.L. & J.C. Pires. 2002. "Phylogeny and classification of the monocotyledons: An update," pp. 3–36. In: Flora of North America Editorial Committee (ed.), Flora of North America north of Mexico. Vol. 26. Oxford University Press, New York and Oxford.
- Kiger, R.W. & J.L. Reveal. 2000. A comprehensive scheme for standardized abbreviation of usable plant-family names and type-based suprafamilial names. Huntia 11: 55–84. Update 2005
- Reveal, J.L. & A.B. Doweld. 1999. Validation of some suprageneric names in Magnoliophyta. Novon 9: 549–553.
- Reveal, J.L. 1998. Seventeen proposals to amend the Code on suprageneric names. Taxon 47: 183–192.
- Reveal, James L (August 1995). "Newly required suprageneric names in Magnoliophyta". Phytologia. 79 (2): 68–76.
- Reveal, J.L. 1996. "What's in a name: Identifying plants in pre-Linnaean botanical literature," pp. 57–90. In: B. Holland (ed.), Prospecting for drugs in ancient and medieval European texts: A scientific approach. Harword Academic Publishers, Paris.
- Reveal, J.L. 1996. A guide to scientific names of vascular plants. Probe 6(July): 16–17.
- Reveal, J.L. 1994. New supraordinal names in Magnoliophyta and the recognition of five classes in the division. Phytologia 76: 1–7.
- Hoogland, R.D. & J.L. Reveal. 1993. "Vascular plant family names in current use," pp 15–60. In: W. Greuter (ed.), NCU-1. Family names in current use for vascular plants, bryophytes, and fungi. Koeltz Scientific Books, Konigstein, Germany
- Jarvis, C.E., F.R. Barrie, D. Allan & J.L. Reveal. 1993. A list of Linnaean generic names and their types. Koeltz Scientific Books, Konigstein, Germany. 100 pp.
- Reveal, J.L. 1993. "Flowering plant families: An overview," pp. 294–330. In: Flora of North America Editorial Committee (ed.), Flora of North America north of Mexico. Vol. 1. Oxford University Press, New York and Oxford.
- Reveal, J.L. 1993. New ordinal names for extant vascular plants. Phytologia 74: 173–177.
- Reveal, J.L. 1993. New subclass and supraordinal names for extant vascular plants. Phytologia 74: 178–179.
- Reveal, J.L. 1993. Automatically typified supraordinal and ordinal names for the flowering plants (Magnoliophyta as recognized by Thorne (1992) and arranged following the principles of priority, autonymy and the substitution of alternative names. Phytologia 74: 193–202.
- Reveal, J.L. 1993. A splitter's guide to the higher taxa of the flowering plants (Magnoliophyta) generally arranged to follow the sequence proposed by Thorne (1992) with certain modifications. Phytologia 74: 203–263.
- Reveal, J.L. 1993. A preliminary list of validly published automatically typified ordinal names of vascular plants. Taxon 42: 825–844.
- Reveal, J.L. (1992). Gentle conquest: the botanical discovery of North America with illustrations from the Library of Congress. Washington, DC: Starwood Pub. ISBN 978-1-56373-002-3.
- Reveal, J.L. 1992. Validation of subclass and supraordinal names in Magnoliophyta. Novon 2: 235–237.
- Reveal, J.L. 1992. Validation of ordinal names of extant vascular plants. Novon 2: 238–240.
- Reveal, J.L. & R.D. Hoogland. 1992. [Family nomenclature for] "Part 2. Families and genera alphabetically in major groups", p. 461–751. In: R.K. Brummitt (comp.), Vascular plant families and genera. Royal Botanic Garden, Kew.
- Reveal, J.L. & R.D. Hoogland. 1991. "Protected plant family names – a new list for consideration," p. 243–249. In: D.L. Hawksworth (ed.), Improving the stability of names: Needs and options. Koeltz Scientific Books, Königstein/Taunus, Germany.
- Reveal, J.L. & R.D. Hoogland. 1991. Validation of three family names in the Magnoliophyta. Bull. Mus. Natl. Hist. Nat. ser. 4, sect. B Adansonia 13: 91–93.
- Reveal, J.L. & R.D. Hoogland. 1991. Conservation proposals for three generic names of Magnoliophyta. Taxon 40: 650–652.
- Reveal, J.L. 1983. The need for an index to infra-taxonomic entities. Taxon 32: 622.
- Reveal, J.L. 1987, Botanical explorations and discoveries in colonial Maryland: an introduction, Huntia, 7: 1-3.
- Reveal, J.L. & H.G. Bedell. 1983. Add the rank superorder denoted by -anae. Taxon 32: 661–662.
- Bedell, H.G. & J.L. Reveal. 1982. An outline and index to Takhtajan's 1980 classification of flowering plants. Taxon 31: 211–232.
- Bedell, H.G. & J.L. Reveal. 1982. Amended outlines and indices for six recently published systems of angiosperm classification. Phytologia 51: 65–156.
- Bedell, H.G. & J.L. Reveal. 1982. A synoptical review of a revised classification of Liliopsida (Magnoliophyta) as proposed by Dahlgren and Clifford. Phytologia 52: 179–183.

=== Web based publications ===
- Reveal, James L (9 April 2012). "Indices Nominum Supragenericorum Plantarum Vascularium: Alphabetical Listing by Genera of Validly Published Suprageneric Names". Plant Biology. University of Maryland.
- 2008 Indices Nominum Supragenericorum Plantarum Vascularium: Alphabetical Listing by Genera of Validly Published Suprageneric Names
- 2007 Classification of extant Vascular Plant Families - An expanded family scheme
- Reveal, James L (1 Oct 2007). "Indices Nominum Supragenericorum Plantarum Vascularium". Plant systematics. University of Maryland: Norton-Brown Herbarium.
- Reveal, James L (21 Sep 2005). "Latest NEWS on Vascular Plant Family Nomenclature". Plant systematics. University of Maryland: Norton-Brown Herbarium.
- Reveal, James L (1 March 2003). "Supraordinal Names of Extant Vascular Plants: Subkingdom, Superdivision, Division, Subdivision, Class and Subclass Names". Plant systematics. University of Maryland: Norton-Brown Herbarium.
- 2001 Vascular Plant Family Nomenclature: Names in Current Use
- Reveal, James L (20 July 2000). "Latest NEWS on Vascular Plant Family Nomenclature". Plant systematics. University of Maryland: Norton-Brown Herbarium. Archived from the original on 31 May 2022.
- 2000 A New Classification of the Monocotyledonous Angiosperms by Chase et al.
- Reveal, James L (27 January 1999). "pbio 450 Lecture Notes: Syllabus Spring 1999 Advanced Plant Taxonomy". Plant systematics. University of Maryland: Norton-Brown Herbarium.
- 1999 Vascular Plant Family Nomenclature: Fate of Suprageneric Proposals at the St. Louis Nomenclature Session for the XVI International Botanical Congress
- 1999 Conspectus of the monocotyledonous angiosperm families in The Families and Genera of Vascular Plants by Kubitzki.
- 1999 A New Provision and Three Examples for Art. 35 of the International Code of Botanical Nomenclature.
- 1999 Vascular Plant Family Nomenclature: Impact of the Failure to Introduce Art. 16, Prop. F to the International Code of Botanical Nomenclature
- 1999 Notes and nomenclatural additions to "An updated classification of the Monocotyledoneae" by Robert F. Thorne.
- 1997 Summary classification of vascular plants.
- 1997 Reveal system of classification: Magnoliophyta.
- 1997 Introduction to "A revised classification of the angiosperms by Robert F. Thorne."
- 1997 Errata for the suprafamilial nomenclature used by Cronquist in his An Integrated System of Classification of Flowering Plants (1981).
- 1997 USDA-APHIS – Concordance of family names.
- Reveal, James L (22 Nov 1998). "Vascular Plant Family Nomenclature: Lists of the Flowering Plant Taxa Accepted by Cronquist, Dahlgren, Reveal, Takhtajan & Thorne". Plant Systematics. University of Maryland: Norton-Brown Herbarium.
  - Cronquist System of Angiosperm Classification
  - Dahlgren system
  - Reveal, James L (5 Nov 1997a). "Reveal System of Classification" (pbio 250 Lecture Notes). Plant Systematics. University of Maryland: Norton-Brown Herbarium.
  - Reveal, James L (5 Nov 1997b). "Takhtajan System of Classification" (pbio 250 Lecture Notes). Plant Systematics. University of Maryland: Norton-Brown Herbarium.
  - Reveal, James L (5 Nov 1997c). "Thorne System of Classification" (pbio 250 Lecture Notes). Plant Systematics. University of Maryland: Norton-Brown Herbarium.
- 1996–2008 Indices nominum familiarum plantarum vascularium. Phylogenetic systems of classification of extant vascular plant families
- 1996–2004 Vascular plant family nomenclature
- 1996 Full family nomenclature from the Indices nominum familiarum plantarum vascularium Project," in H.D. Wilson (http://www.plantsystematics.org/reveal/pbio/pb250/thor1.htmled.), Magnoliophyta Archived 2011-10-06 at the Wayback Machine
- 1995 Indices nominum supragenericorum plantarum vascularium.
- 1994 Reveal, J.L. & J.S. Pringle. Taxonomic botany and floristics.
- 1993 Flora of North America north of Mexico: FLOWERING PLANT FAMILIES: AN OVERVIEW

== Bibliography ==
- Frodin, David G. (2001). Guide to Standard Floras of the World (2nd ed.).
- Reveal, James L (15 October 2014). "Curriculum vitae".
- Reveal, James L (24 May 2013). "Home Page of James L Reveal". Plant Systematics. Department of Plant Biology, Cornell University.
