= Rolf Dahlgren =

Swedish-Danish botanist

- Born: 7 July 1932; Örebro
- Died: 14 February 1987 (aged 54); Scania
- Known for: Dahlgren system
- Spouse: Gertrud Dahlgren
- Scientific career
- Fields: Botany
- Workplaces: University of Copenhagen
- Author abbrev. (botany): R.Dahlgren

Rolf Martin Theodor Dahlgren (7 July 1932 – 14 February 1987) was a Swedish-Danish botanist and professor at the University of Copenhagen from 1973 to his death.

== Life ==
Dahlgren was born in Örebro on 7 July 1932 to apothecary Rudolf Dahlgren and wife Greta née Dahlstrand. He took his MSc degree in Biology in (1955) and PhD degree in Botany in (1963) at Lund University. He was killed in a car crash in Scania, Sweden on 14 February 1987.

== Career ==
He continued working on South African plants during expeditions in 1956-57 and 1965–66, while affiliated with the Botanical Museum in Lund as docent. In 1973, he became professor of botany at the University of Copenhagen. Here, he developed his system of Angiosperm classification, based on many more characters simultaneously than previous systems, most notably many chemical plant traits (see also chemotaxonomy). Although the system was first presented in Danish, it rapidly gained widespread acceptance, particularly due to the instructive diagrams, so-called Dahlgrenograms. His work on family circumscription in the Monocotyledons, published with Harold Trevor Clifford and Peter Frederick Yeo, has had profound influence well into the molecular age.

A Rolf Dahlgren Memorial Symposium was held in Berlin, Germany later in 1987. The couple had three children, Susanna, Helena and Fredrik.

In 1986, he was elected member of Royal Swedish Academy of Sciences. The South African monotypic plant genus Dahlgrenodendron (J.H. Ross) J.J.M. van der Merwe & A.E. van Wyk was named to honour him in 1988.

== List of selected publications ==
- Dahlgren, Rolf (1963). Studies on Aspalathus and some related genera in South Africa (PhD thesis). Lund: Lund University.
- Dahlgren, Rolf (1974–76). Angiospermernes taxonomi, vol. 1-4. Copenhagen: Akademisk Forlag.
- Dahlgren, R. (1975). "A system of classification of angiosperms to be used to demonstrate the distribution of characters". Botaniska Notiser. 128: 119–147.
- Dahlgren R. (1975b). The distribution of characters within an angiosperm system. I. Some embryological characters. Botaniska Notiser 128: 181–197
- Dahlgren, Rolf (1977). A commentary on a diagrammatic presentation of the angiosperms in relation to the distribution of character states. pp. 253–284. in Kubitzki (1977)
- Dahlgren, R., 1977b. A note on the Taxonomy of the 'Synpetalae' and related groups. Publications of the Cairo University Herbarium, 7–8: 83- 102.
- Dahlgren. R., Nielsen, B. J., Goldblait, P. & Rourke, J. P., 1979. Further notes on Retziaceae, its chemical contents and affinities. Annals of the Missouri Botanical Garden, 66: 545-556
- Dahlgren, R., Jensen, S. R., & Nielsen, B. J., 1976. Iridoid compounds in Fouquieraceae and notes on its possible affinities. Bolaniska Notiser 129: 207-212.
- Dahlgren, R. M. T. (February 1980). "A revised system of classification of the angiosperms". Botanical Journal of the Linnean Society. 80 (2): 91–124. doi:10.1111/j.1095-8339.1980.tb01661.x.
- Dahlgren, Rolf; Clifford, H. T. (1982). The monocotyledons: A comparative study. London and New York: Academic Press. ISBN 9780122006807.
- Dahlgren R.(1983). "General Aspects of Angiosperm Evolution and Macrosystematics". Nordic Journal of Botany 3: 119-149
- Dahlgren, Rolf; Rasmussen, F.N. (1983). "Monocotyledon Evolution: Characters and Phylogenetic Estimation". Evolutionary Biology. Vol. 16. pp. 255–395. doi:10.1007/978-1-4615-6971-8_7. ISBN 978-1-4615-6973-2.
- Dahlgren, Rolf M.; Clifford, H. T.; Yeo, Peter (1985). The families of the monocotyledons: Structure, evolution, and taxonomy. Berlin and New York: Springer-Verlag. ISBN 978-3-642-64903-5. Additional excerpts
- Dahlgren, Rolf; Lu, An-ming (1985). "Campynemanthe (Campynemaceae): Morphology, microsporogenesis, early ovule ontogeny and relationships". Nordic Journal of Botany. 5 (4): 321–330. Bibcode:1985NorJB...5..321D. doi:10.1111/j.1756-1051.1985.tb01660.x.

== See also ==
- Dahlgren system
- Chemotaxonomy
