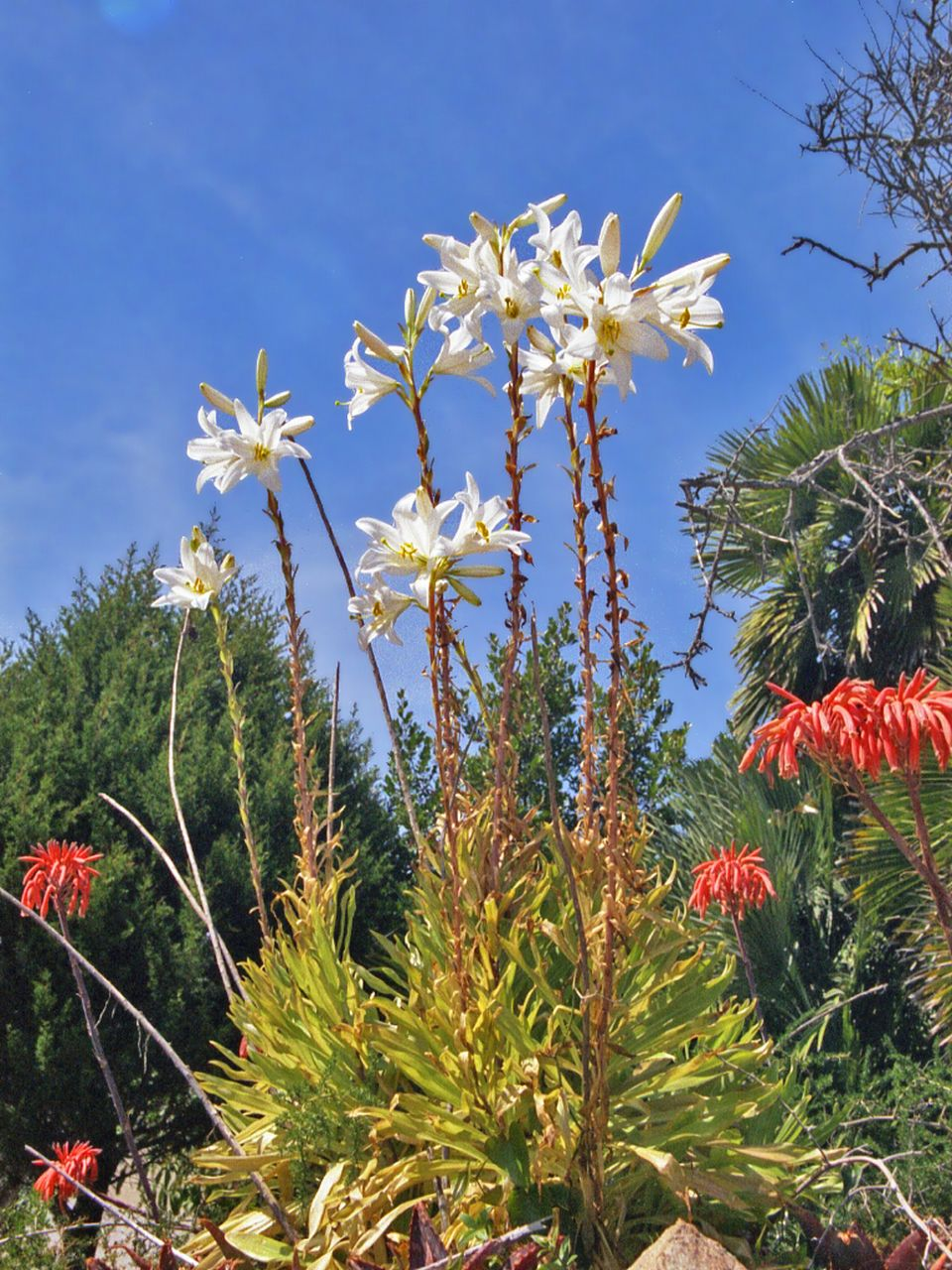
- Lilium candidum

Scientific classification
- Kingdom: Plantae
- Clade: Embryophytes
- Clade: Tracheophytes
- Clade: Angiosperms
- Clade: Monocots
- Order: Liliales
- Family: Liliaceae; Juss.

Type genus
- Lilium L.

Type species
- Lilium candidum L.

Subfamilies and tribes
- subfamily: Lilioideae; tribe: Medeoleae tribe: Lilieae: subfamily: Calochortoideae; subfamily: Streptopoideae

Diversity
- About 600 species

= Taxonomy of Liliaceae =

Taxonomy of Liliaceae Temporal range: 68–0 Ma Late Cretaceous - Recent

Classification of the lily family Liliaceae

The taxonomy of the plant family Liliaceae has had a complex history since its first description in the mid-eighteenth century. Originally, the Liliaceae were defined as having a "calix" (perianth) of six equal-coloured parts, six stamens, a single style, and a superior, three-chambered (trilocular) ovary turning into a capsule fruit at maturity. The taxonomic circumscription of the family Liliaceae progressively expanded until it became the largest plant family and also extremely diverse, being somewhat arbitrarily defined as all species of plants with six tepals and a superior ovary. It eventually came to encompass about 300 genera and 4,500 species, and was thus a "catch-all" and hence paraphyletic. Only since the more modern taxonomic systems developed by the Angiosperm Phylogeny Group (APG) and based on phylogenetic principles has it been possible to identify the many separate taxonomic groupings within the original family and redistribute them, leaving a relatively small core as the modern family Liliaceae, with fifteen genera and 600 species.

The Liliaceae emerged from the Liliales order, separating from its sister clade around 52 million years ago (mya), and diversifying around 34 mya. Of the major clades, the Lilieae arose in Eurasia while the Medeoleae arose in North America but was subsequently dispersed, as may have the Streptopoideae and Calochortoideae. Liliaceae fossils have been dated to the Paleogene and Cretaceous eras in the Antarctic.

The Liliaceae probably arose as shade plants, with subsequent evolution to open areas including deciduous forest in the more open autumnal period. This was accompanied by a shift from rhizomes to bulbs, to more showy flowers, the production of capsular fruit and narrower parallel-veined leaves.

While the suprageneric (above genus level) structure of the family has varied greatly with its ever-changing circumscription, as currently constituted the family consists of three subfamilies: Lilioideae, Calochortoideae and Streptopoideae. Lilioideae is further divided into two tribes, Medeoleae and Lilieae. The three subfamilies contain fifteen genera and approximately 600 species in all.

== History ==
=== Pre-Darwinian ===
The type genus, Lilium, from which the name of the family was derived, was originally formally described by Carl Linnaeus in 1753, with seven species. He placed Lilium within the Hexandria Monogynia (six stamens, one carpel) in his sexual classification in the Species Plantarum. The family Liliaceae was first described by Michel Adanson in 1763, but formally named by Antoine Laurent de Jussieu in 1789. Adanson described eight subfamilies with 78 genera, however the subfamily he described as Lis (lilies) had seven genera (Uvularia, Mithridatium, Mendoni, Lilium, Fritillaria, Imperialis — now part of Fritillaria — and Tulipa) of which four are in the modern genus. Jussieu placed these into the ordo, Lilia in the classis, Stamina Perigyna of the Monocotyledones (monocots), with eight genera (Tulipa, Erythronioum, Methonica, Uvularia, Fritillaria, Imperialis, Lilium, Yucca) only four of which remain in the family. He defined Lilia as "calix" (perianth) of six equal coloured parts, six stamens, a superior ovary, single style, and trilocular capsule. The term ordo at that time was closer to what we now understand as family, rather than order. Although Jussieu used the Latin "lilia" in his Genera Plantarum, elsewhere he used the French "liliacées", as had Adanson. The word "Liliaceae" was soon widely used by botanists such as Samuel Frederick Gray, John Lindley, and Pierre-Joseph Redouté in the early nineteenth century.

Gray (1821) provided the first description of Jussieu's scheme in English, identifying two genera occurring in Britain (Tulipa, Fritillaria), distinguished by the absence or presence of basal nectaries. His key used the presence of six equal stamens, a single style, a simple petaloid (undifferentiated tepals resembling petals) perianth and a trilocular capsule with flat seeds to identify the family. Although Augustin De Candolle (1813) had not explicitly described the Liliaceae, his overall classification scheme influenced many later writers including Gray. In this scheme, the Liliaceae were considered a family within those vascular plants (Vasculares) whose vascular bundles were thought to arise from within (Endogènes, endogenous), a term he preferred to Monocotylédonés. Jussieu's Monocotyledones became the Phanérogames (Phenogamae in Gray), meaning "visible seed", hence Endogenæ phanerogamæ. Candolle also instituted the concept of ordered ranks, based on classes, subclasses, familles (Latin: ordines naturales) and tribus (tribes), subdividing the Liliaceae.

Lindley was the first post-Linnaean English systematist, publishing his work in 1830, and following the reasoning of Jussieu he used the term tribe to describe the Liliaceae as a division of the hexapetaloid monocots, characterised by a superior ovary, highly developed perianth, inward turning anthers, a trilocular polyspermous capsule and seeds with a soft spongy coat. He offered seven genera as examples (Erythronium, Lilium, Calochortus, Blandfordia, Polianthes, Hemerocallis and Funkia). By 1846, in his final work, he refined and greatly expanded his taxonomy, favouring the term Alliances of Endogens over monocots as a class, of which there were eleven. Of these "alliances", the Liliales consisted of four Orders (families) including Liliaceae, which he referred to as lilyworts in the vernacular, with 133 genera and 1200 species. In this work he unhappily acknowledged the confusing array of different approaches to the classification of the Liliaceae, the lack of a clear definition, and the great diversity in the circumscription of the order, which had expanded vastly, with many subdivisions. As he saw it, the Liliaceae had already become a ("catch-all") grouping, being "everything that does not belong to the other parts of the Lilial Alliance", but expressed hope that the future would reveal some characteristic that would group them better. In other words, he foresaw that Liliaceae would come to be regarded as paraphyletic. By the time of the next major British classification, that of Bentham and Hooker in 1883 (published in Latin) several of Lindley's other families had been absorbed into the Liliaceae. This was the last major classification using the "natural" or pre-evolutionary approach to classification, based on characteristics selected a posteriori in order to group together taxa that have the greatest number of shared characteristics. This approach, also referred to as polythetic was superseded by ones based on an understanding of the acquisition of characteristics through evolution, referred to as phyletic.

=== Post-Darwinian ===
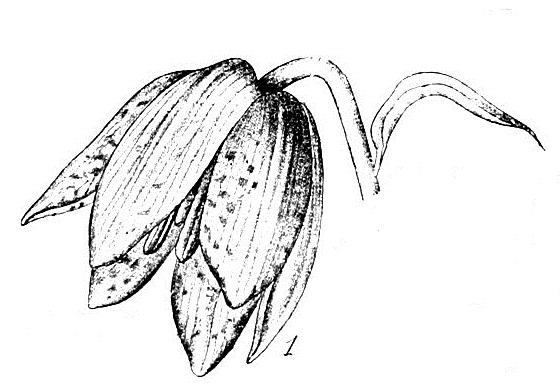
Fritillaria ophioglossifolia, R Wettstein Handbuch der Systematischen Botanik 1901–1924

Although Charles Darwin's Origin of Species (1859) preceded Bentham and Hooker's publication, the latter project was commenced much earlier and George Bentham was initially sceptical of Darwinism. The new phyletic approach changed the way that taxonomists considered plant classification, incorporating evolutionary information into their schemata, but this did little to further define the circumscription of Liliaceae. The major works in the late nineteenth and early twentieth century employing this approach were in the German literature, the Eichler (1875–1886), Engler and Prantl (1886–1924) and Wettstein (1901–1935) systems. These placed the Liliaceae into one of the major subdivisions of the monocotyledons, the Liliiflorae. In the English literature, Charles Bessey (1915) followed Adolf Engler in defining Liliaceae as "Pistil mostly 3-celled; stamens 6; perianth of two similar whorls, each of three similar leaves", although placing the Liliales in a novel subclass of monocots, the Strobiloideae, while from John Hutchinson (1959) onwards the Liliaceae were treated as part of the Liliales (see Table 1).

Over time the Liliaceae became increasingly broadly, and somewhat arbitrarily, defined as all species of plants with six tepals and a superior ovary. They eventually came to encompass about 300 genera and 4,500 species, within the order Liliales in the scheme of Arthur Cronquist (1981). Cronquist was a "lumper" preferring a small number of very large groupings and his classification of the Liliaceae represented the greatest expansion of the family to date. Cronquist placed most flowering petaloid monocots with six stamens in this very broad (and clearly polyphyletic) family, hence the alternative name lilioid monocots. He rejected the importance of ovary position and thus included with the Liliaceae with their superior ovary (hypogynous), the Amaryllidaceae, some species of which had an inferior ovary (epigynous), and which others separated into a distinct family. The Liliaceae were one of the major families in the Cronquist system which included 22 families in addition to Liliaceae in the more restricted sense (sensu stricto, s.s.) used by others. Later more conventional schemes include the system of Robert F. Thorne and that of Armen Takhtajan which characterised the family as petaloid monocots, characterised by showy flowers with tepals and without starch in the endosperm.

=== Deconstructing Liliaceae ===
Other botanists in the twentieth century echoed Lindley's concerns about the lack of a clearly defined grouping for Liliaceae. The earliest of these was Johannes Paulus Lotsy (1911), building on Wettstein's work. Lotsy suggested four separate families, Liliaceae, Alliaceae, Agapanthaceae and Gilliesiaceae, within the Liliifloren. This recognised the major groupings that would later be transferred to Amaryllidaceae as subfamilies Allioideae and Agapanthoideae, with Gilliesieae as a tribe within the Allioideae. This approach was later followed by Herbert Huber in 1969. These various proposals to separate small groups of genera into more homogeneous families made little impact until Rolf Dahlgren (1985), following Huber's lead, developed a system incorporating new information, including synapomorphic characters (i.e., shared characters believed to have evolved from a common ancestor). While Cronquist was a "lumper", Dahlgren was a "splitter", preferring a larger number of more homogeneous groupings. Where Cronquist saw one family, Dahlgren saw forty distributed over three orders (predominantly Liliales and Asparagales), reducing Liliaceae to ten genera (see Table 3). Over the 1980s, in the context of a more general review of the classification of angiosperms, the Liliaceae were subjected to more intense scrutiny. By the end of that decade, the Royal Botanic Gardens at Kew, the British Museum of Natural History and the Edinburgh Botanical Gardens formed a committee to examine the possibility of separating the family into smaller taxa, at least for the purpose of organizing their herbaria. That committee finally recommended that 24 new families be created in the place of the original broad Liliaceae, largely by elevating subfamilies to the rank of separate families.

The 1990s saw considerable progress in plant phylogenetics and cladistic theory, enabling a phylogenetic tree to be constructed for the flowering plants. The establishment of major new clades necessitated a departure from the older but widely used classifications such as Cronquist and Thorne, based largely on morphology rather than genetic data. These developments complicated discussions on plant evolution and necessitated a major taxonomic restructuring. rbcL gene sequencing and cladistic analysis of monocots in 1995 had redefined the Liliales order out of four original morphological orders sensu Dahlgren. The largest clade within this redefined Liliales, christened the "core Liliales" representing a now much reduced Liliaceae, had all previously been included in the Liliales, and included three taxonomic groups: (i) Liliaceae sensu Dahlgren, but also both the (ii) Calochortaceae as defined by Minoro Tamura (sensu Tamura) and (iii) Clintonia-Medeola which had been included in Liliaceae sensu Tamura (see Table 3).

This newly, more narrowly (sensu stricto, s.s.) circumscribed Liliaceae, corresponded to the emerging circumscription of the family in the Angiosperm Phylogeny Group system (1998). While this also corresponded most closely with Dahlgren's circumscription relative to the older much broader (sensu lato, s.l.) constructions, it gave rise to some potentially confusing terminology. Compared to the very broad historical s.l. construction of Liliaceae, the Dahlgren, Tamura and APG constructions were much narrower. These have variously been referred to as "core Liliales" and sensu APG for the broadest construction, while the intervening schemes of Tamura and Takhtajan (who was also a "splitter") which are narrower have been referred to as Liliaceae s.s., sensu Dahlgren, and sensu Tamura. Of these the narrowest circumscription is that of Dahlgren, including only Lilieae s.l.. In modern terminology, while "core Liliales" represents Liliaceae sensu APG, Liliaceae sensu Tamura corresponds to Lilioideae s.l., and sensu Dahlgren with Lilieae s.l. or Lilioideae s.s.. Calochortoideae and Streptopoideae sensu APG represent and Calochortaceae sensu Tamura, and Clintonia plus Medeola (Medeoleae) Medeoloideae sensu Tamura (see Table 3).

== Modern classification of Liliaceae ==
To meet the need for a thorough revision of the taxonomy of the flowering plants (angiosperms), systematists formed the Angiosperm Phylogeny Group (APG), resulting in a new classification published in 1998. The scheme was largely based on the work of Kåre Bremer and colleagues at Uppsala and Stockholm universities in the late 1970s, and became universally accessible on the internet in 1996. It was an ordinal system, concentrating on orders rather than families, prioritising monophyly, in which Liliales were recognised as one of ten monocot orders, containing nine families. However progress was rapid and the modern era of the taxonomy of the family Liliaceae comes from Judd and colleagues (2002), the APG II (2003) and APG III (2009), while the Linear APG III assigned it the family number 61. The original APG did not specifically address the issues of the polyphyly within Liliaceae, but APG II did so within the two closely morphologically related orders, Liliales and Asparagales recognising the continued common use of Liliaceae in the broad sense (sensu lato, s.l.).

These studies of DNA and morphological data (particularly reproductive morphology) together with phylogenetic analyses, allowed the conclusion that the "petaloid monocots" do not belong to one botanical family but rather are distributed across two separate orders, the Asparagales and Liliales. The monophyly of these newly defined orders is supported by cladistic analysis based on morphology, 18S rDNA, the plastid gene rbcL, and other DNA sequences.

These studies, together with other analyses within each of these two orders, allowed the redistribution of the original genera of Liliaceae s.l. into a variety of families across the Liliales and Asparagales, as illustrated in Cladogram 1. This redistribution resulted in considerable changes both in the suprafamilial positioning of Liliaceae within the overall APG classification (as shown in Table 1 below), as well as the subfamilial structure (see Suprageneric subdivisions).

Table 1: Evolution of placement of Liliaceae in different taxonomic schemes
Rank	Bentham and Hooker (1883)	Cronquist (1981)	Takhtajan (1966, 1980, 2009)	Dahlgren (1977, 1985)	Thorne (1992–2007)	APG (2003–9)
Division		Magnoliophyta	Magnoliophyta		Magnoliophyta	
Class	Monocotyledons	Liliopsida	Liliopsida	(monocots) - unranked	Magnoliopsida (Angiospermae)	(monocots) - unranked
Subclass		Liliidae	Liliidae	Liliidae	Liliidae	
Superorder (Series)	Coronarieæ		(Liliiflorae) Lilianae	(Lilianae) Liliiflorae	Lilianae	Lilianae
Order		Liliales	Liliales	Liliales	Liliales	Liliales
For a comparison of the classifications of genera from 1959 (Hutchinson) to 2000 (Wilson and Morrison), see Table 1 in Fay et al. 2006, Table 1 in Peruzzi et al. 2009 and Table 3.

== Phylogeny ==
The synthesis of molecular data with cladistic analysis suggests eleven orders of monocotyledons, one of fourteen clades of Angiosperms, and forming a grade with six other orders. Sequencing of the rbcL and trnL-F plastid genes revealed four main Liliales lineages:

1. Liliaceae group: Liliaceae (including some former Uvulariaceae and Calochortaceae), Philesiaceae and Smilacaceae;
2. Campynemataceae;
3. Colchicaceae group (Colchicoid lilies): Colchicaceae (including Petermannia and Uvularia), Alstroemeriaceae and Luzuriaga;
4. Melanthiaceae (including Trilliaceae).

The original family Liliaceae in the broad sense (sensu lato, s.l.), which encompassed a large number of differing groups of genera, was highly polyphyletic (see Cladogram 1). This led to botanists increasingly adopting a more narrow monophyletic concept, i.e. strict sense (sensu stricto, s.s.) of the family based on molecular phylogenetic relationships, as expressed in the 2009 APG III system, rather than the older sensu lato one. Former members of the Liliaceae are now principally classified in different families and subfamilies of the Liliales and Asparagales as shown in the phylogeny represented in Cladogram I. Other families and orders containing former Liliaceae taxa are the Nartheciaceae (Dioscoreales), Tofieldiaceae (Alismatales), Tecophilaeaceae (Asparagales) and the former Uvulariaceae. The achlorophyllous (non-photosynthesising) Corsiaceae were added to Liliales by APG III in 2009.

Sequencing of the rbcL and matK chloroplast genes of Lilium and related genera confirmed the circumscription of the family in the sensu stricto usage of Tamura (1998). Chloroplast ndhF gene sequencing also supported Liliaceae monophyly, reuniting the Liliaceae sensu Tamura and Calochortaceae sensu Tamura (see Table 2 & Table 3 below).

Cladogram I: Phylogeny of Liliaceae and related families

- - - Liliales
      - Corsiaceae
      - Campynemataceae
      - - - Melanthiaceae^{L}
          - - Petermanniaceae
            - - Colchicaceae^{L}
              - - Luzuriagaceae^{L}
                - Alstroemeriaceae^{L}
          - - - Ripogonaceae^{L}
              - Philesiaceae^{L}
            - - Smilacaceae^{L}
              - Liliaceae sensu stricto
    - - Asparagales
        - Orchidaceae
        - - Boryaceae^{L}
          - Blandfordiaceae^{L}
          - Lanariaceae^{L}
          - - Asteliaceae^{L}
            - Hypoxidaceae^{A}
        - - Ixioliriaceae^{A}
          - Tecophilaeaceae
        - Doryanthaceae
        - Iridaceae
        - Xeronemataceae^{L}
        - Xanthorrhoeaceae^{L}
        - Amaryllidaceae
        - - Aphyllanthaceae^{L}
          - - Themidaceae^{L}
            - Hyacinthaceae^{L}
          - Agavaceae^{L/A}
        - Laxmanniaceae^{L}
        - Asparagaceae^{L}
        - Ruscaceae^{L}
      - commelinids

1. Molecular phylogenetic relationships for Liliales and Asparagales, showing relationship between Liliaceae s.s. and families formerly placed in Liliaceae s.l.^{L} or Amaryllidaceae^{A} (itself sometimes treated as part of Liliaceae), (Note: Agavaceae has been included in both families at various times) and families formerly placed in other orders.
2. APG III (2009) absorbed Luzuriagaceae into Alstroemeriaceae and added Corsiaceae.

== Evolution and biogeography ==
The major diversification amongst the Angiosperms (flowering plants) can be dated to the end of the Early Cretaceous period which stretched from 146 to 100 million years ago (mya). The development of a phylogenetic approach to taxonomy, starting with Charles Bessey's The phylogenetic taxonomy of flowering plants (1915) suggested the Liliales formed some of the earliest monocots, with an estimated date of origin of 124 mya for the stem node (most recent common ancestor of the clade of interest and its sister clade) age and between 117 mya to 82 mya for the crown node (most recent common ancestor of the sampled species of the clade of interest) age. Molecular analysis suggests that the Liliaceae sensu APG ("core Liliales") were part of one of four early clades of Liliales, namely Campynemataceae, Melanthiaceae, Alstroemeriaceae + Luzuriagaceae + Colchicaceae and Smilacaceae + Liliaceae, dated to 68–65 mya (stem node) with the separation of the Smilaceae and Liliaceae sister clades (crown node) occurring later at around 55–52 mya. (Note: Janssen and Bremer (2004) have somewhat earlier dates of 91 and 80 mya respectively but consider these similar within methodological limits) divergence within the Liliaceae appeared at about 36–34 mya, within Liliaceae sensu Tamura (Lilioideae s.l.) at 27 mya, Liliaceae sensu Dahlgren (Lilieae s.s. and Tulipeae) at 20 mya (Miocene).

Within the Liliaceae sensu Dahlgren there developed two main evolutionary subclades (see Cladogram II and Table 3). The first of these, characterised as the Lilieae s.s. (Lilium, Fritillaria, Nomocharis), Cardiocrinum), Notholirion) diverged around 12 mya. The second subclade was the Tulipeae (Erythronium, Tulipa), (Gagea). Divergence within Calochortus is dated to 7 mya. This places the emergence of the Liliaceae at approximately the last (Maastrichtian period) of the Late Cretaceous periods (72 to 66 mya) to early (Paleocene) Paleogene periods (66 to 23 mya), formerly the Cretaceous–Tertiary boundary, 65 mya.

The southern hemisphere intercontinental distributions of Liliales suggests a connection to Gondwana, whose breakup into western (Africa, South America) and eastern (Australia, Antarctica, Madagascar, India) portions occurred at 180–150 mya, and the final separation of the western portion into Africa and South America at 80 mya coinciding with the emergence of the Liliales. Thus the immediate ancestor of the Liliales is likely to have existed during the period of interconnection of the African and South American-Antarctic-Australian portions of Late Cretaceous Gondwana. While the ancestral clade appears to have been distributed in both northern and southern hemispheres, Liliaceae per se is holarctic, confined to the northern hemisphere with both Eurasian (including some North African representatives) and North American lineages. It is likely that they originated in North America but were able to expand to Eurasia ~30–40 mya via Beringia that connected the two during the Tertiary period. The presence of genera whIch are restricted to Eurasia suggests a vicariance (separation of populations by continental division) split between Medeoleae and Lilieae involving Eurasia and North America (Cladogram II).

Cladogram II: Evolution of Liliaceae

- 146–100 Angiosperms — Monocots — 124
  - (other)
  - Liliales 117–82 (Gondwana)
    - Campynemataceae
    - Melanthiaceae
    - Alstroemeriaceae + Luzuriagaceae + Colchicaceae
    - 68–65 Smilacaceae+Liliaceae 55–52
      - Smilacaceae
      - Liliaceae sensu APG 36–34
        - Calochortaceae sensu Tamura<br />(North America)
          - Streptopoideae
          - Calochortoideae
        - Liliaceae sensu Tamura 27=Lilioideae s.l.
          - Medeoleae
            (North America)
          - Lilaceae sensu Dahlgren 20=Lilieae s.s. + Tulipeae<br />(Eurasia)
            - Lilieae s.s. 12 (Himalayas)
              Lilium etc.
            - Tulipeae (East Asia)
              Tulipa etc.

Biogeographical origins and dates in mya

Liliaceae sensu Dahlgren arose in Eurasia, while within Liliaceae sensu Dahlgren the Lilieae s.s. subclade arose in the Himalayas (Qinghai-Tibetan Plateau), with later radiation there in montane and alpine habitats. Species of Lilium and Fritillaria then dispersed into the rest of Eurasia and North America. The second subclade, the Tulipeae arose in East Asia with subsequent colonisation of North America by Erythronium and Lloydia. On the other hand, Clintonia-Medeola (Medeoleae) may have appeared in North America but subsequently underwent intercontinental dispersal (although some evidence points to a Eurasian origin). The Calochortaceae sensu Tamura (Streptopoideae and Calochortoideae) appears to have evolved in western North America, with subsequent colonisation of East Asia by Streptopus and the ancestral Tricyrtis.

Liliaceae probably arose as shade plants in closed shaded habitats, with subsequent evolution of Liliaceae sensu Dahlgren and Calochortus to open areas including deciduous forest in the more open autumnal period, but then a return of some species (e.g. Cardiocrinum). This was accompanied by a shift from rhizomes to bulbs, to more showy flowers, the production of capsular fruit and narrower parallel-veined leaves. Again, some reversal to the broader reticulate-veined leaves occurred (e.g. Cardiocrinum). In addition such molecular studies show that share characteristics do not necessarily indicate descent from a common ancestor but rather may arise from adaptive convergence in similar habitats.

The fossil record of Liliales is relatively poor, but Liliaceae fossils have been dated to the Paleogene and Cretaceous periods in the Antarctic.

== Characteristics ==
=== Liliaceae ===
The diversity of characteristics complicates description of Liliaceae morphology, and confused taxonomic classification for centuries. The diversity is also of considerable evolutionary significance (see Evolution). The family Liliaceae are characterised as monocotyledonous, perennial, herbaceous, bulbous (or rhizomatous in the case of Medeoleae) flowering plants with simple trichomes (root hairs) and contractile roots. The flowers may be arranged along the stem, developing from the base, or as a single flower at the tip of the stem, or as a cluster of flowers. They contain both male (androecium) and female (gynoecium) characteristics and are symmetric radially, but sometimes as a mirror image. Most flowers are large and colourful, except for Medeoleae. Both the petals and sepals are usually similar and appear as two concentric groups (whorls) of "petals", that are often striped or multi-coloured, and produce nectar at their bases. The stamens are usually in two groups of three (trimerous) and the pollen has a single groove (monosulcate). The ovary is superior, i.e. placed above the attachment of the other parts. There are three fused carpels (syncarpous) with one to three chambers (locules), a single style and a three-lobed stigma. The embryo sac is of the Fritillaria type. The fruit is generally a wind-dispersed capsule, but occasionally a berry (Medeoleae) which is dispersed by animals. The leaves are generally simple and elongated with veins parallel to the edges, arranged singly and alternating on the stem, but may form a rosette at the base of the stem.

=== Subclades ===
(See Table 3). The ten genera (two genera of Table 3 are subsumed into other genera) of the subfamily Lilioideae are characterised by contractile bulbs and roots and a megagametophyte (embryo-sac) of the Fritillaria-type with four megaspores. Within the Lilioideae, the eight genera considered as Liliaceae by Dahlgren (sensu Dahlgren), that is Lilieae s.l., are characterised by loculicidal capsules and a basic chromosome number x=12. Within this clade, Lilieae s.s. are characterised by papillose tepals (with the exception of Fritillaria) and numerous fleshy bulb-scales as well as a morphologically distinct karyotype with two long metacentric chromosomes and 10 telocentrics of medium length. The two genera within Tulipeae are distinguished by pseudo-basifixed anthers and single bulb scales. The two genera of Medeoleae are distinguished by having rhizomes instead of bulbs and berries instead of capsules, and a very unusual form of vesicular-arbuscular mycorrhizae.

The five genera constituting the Streptopoideae and Calochortoideae subfamilies form another distinct group, previously characterised under the Calochortoideae alone. These have creeping rhizomes, styles divided at their apices, and an embryo-sac of the Polygonum-type with a simple megaspore and triploid endosperm. At times, these genera were considered as a separate family (Calochortaceae; e.g. Tamura) or even placed in the more heterogeneous Uvulariaceae sensu Dahlgren. However most of the latter had low morphological similarity to the Liliaceae, and Uvularia and Disporum are now classified in the Colchicaceae. Disporum contained both Asian and North American species which had always been distinguishable. Following molecular analysis, the North American species were restored to the genus Prosartes and retained in Liliaceae, subfamily Streptopoideae, while the Asian species were moved to Colchicaceae.

Liliaceae: Morphological characteristics
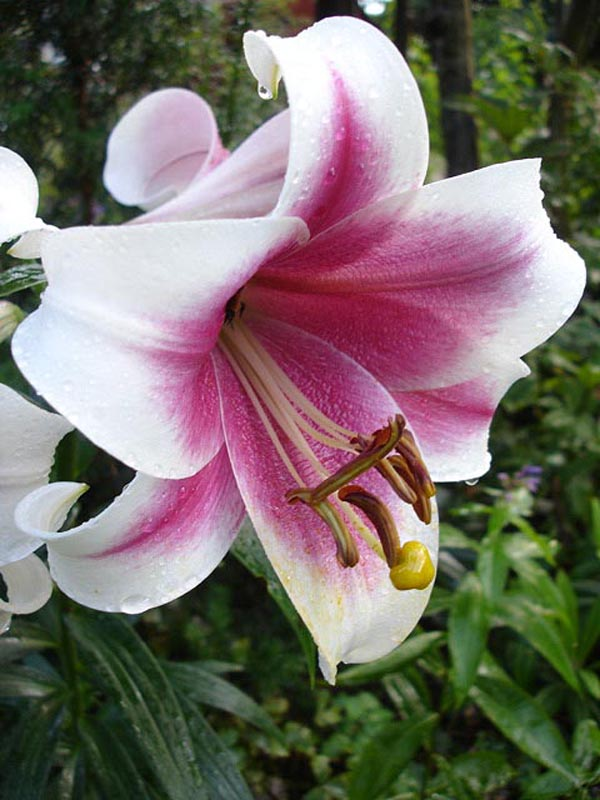
Lilium: Perigonium of six undifferentiated tepals, in two trimerous whorls and side-connected (dorsifixed) anthers

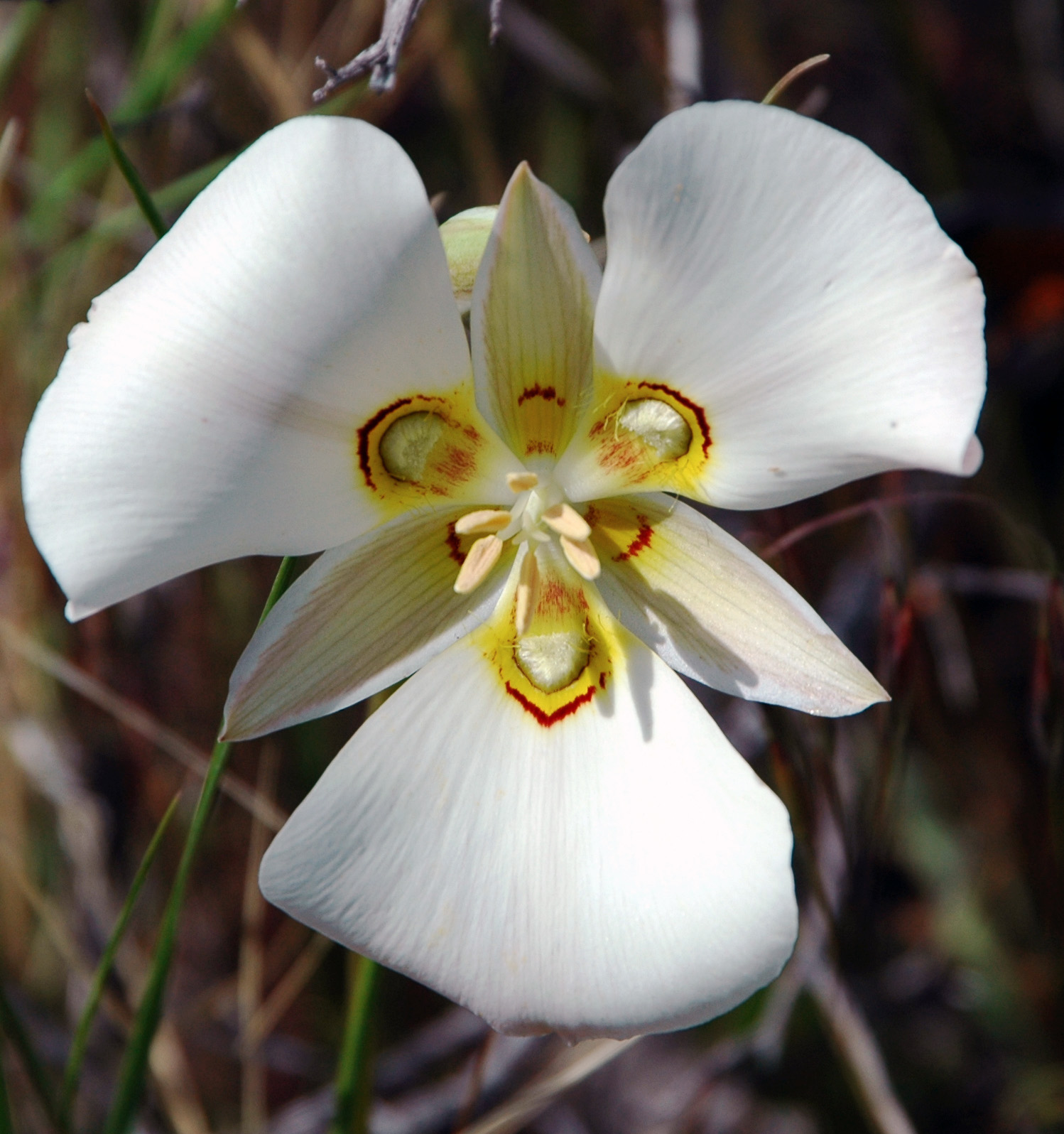
Calochortus nuttallii: Tepals in two clearly distinguished whorls of three sepals and three petals

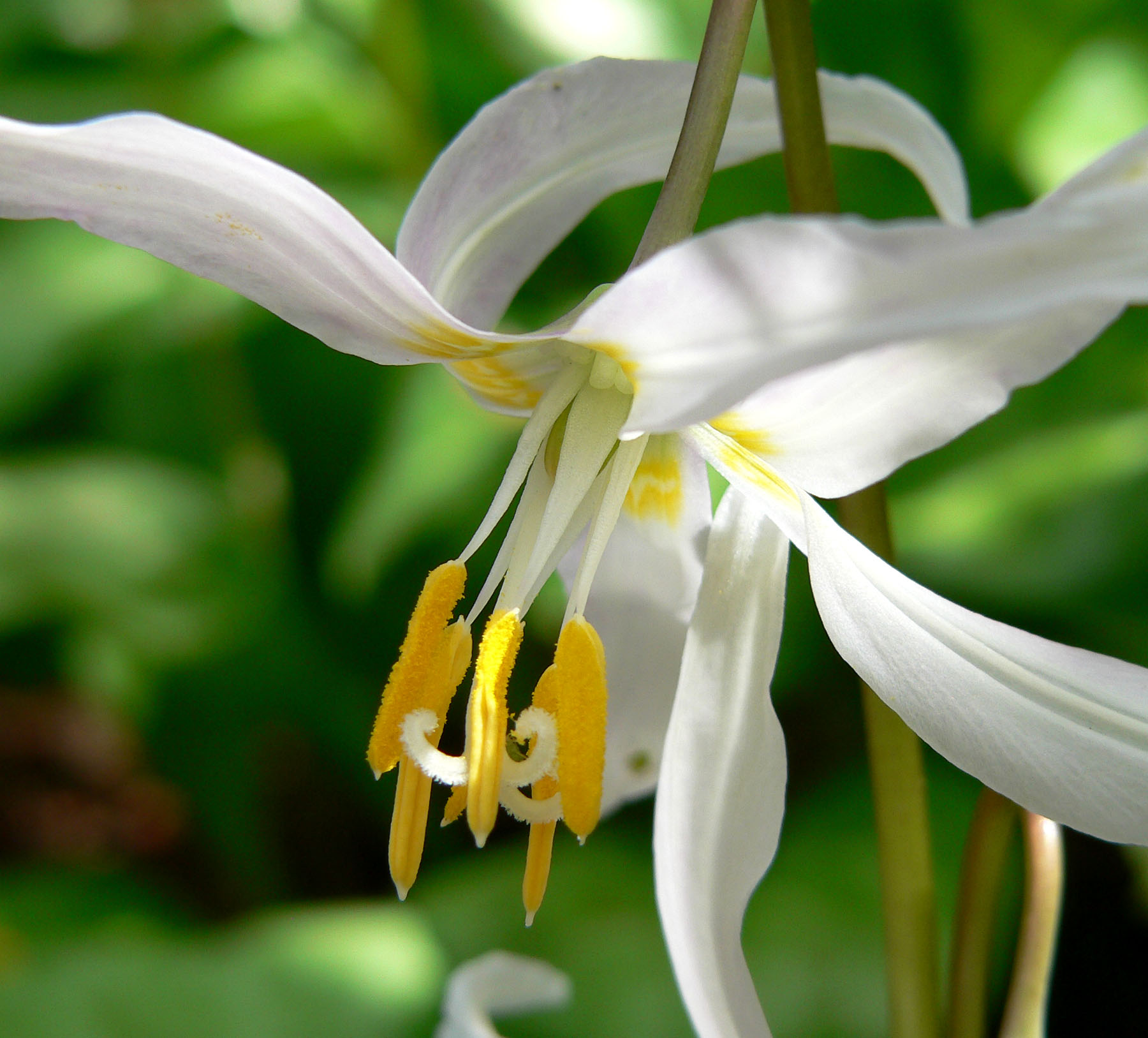
Erythronium revolutum: Three stigmata and pseudo-basifixed anthers surrounding filament tip

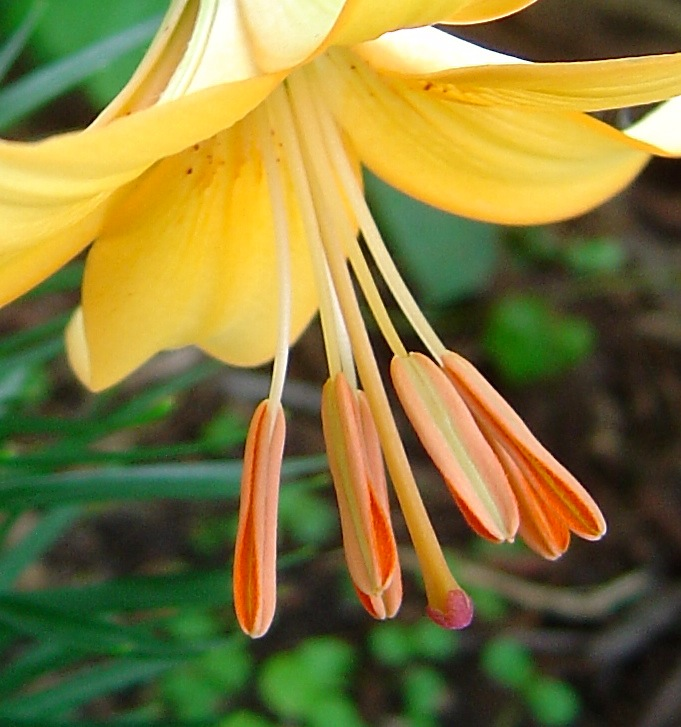
Lilium: Longitudinal dehiscence of anthers

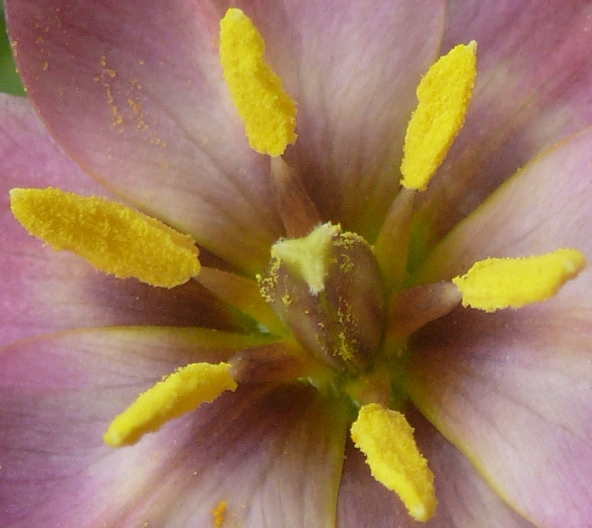
Tulipa humilis: Multiple connate (fused) carpels surrounded by stamens

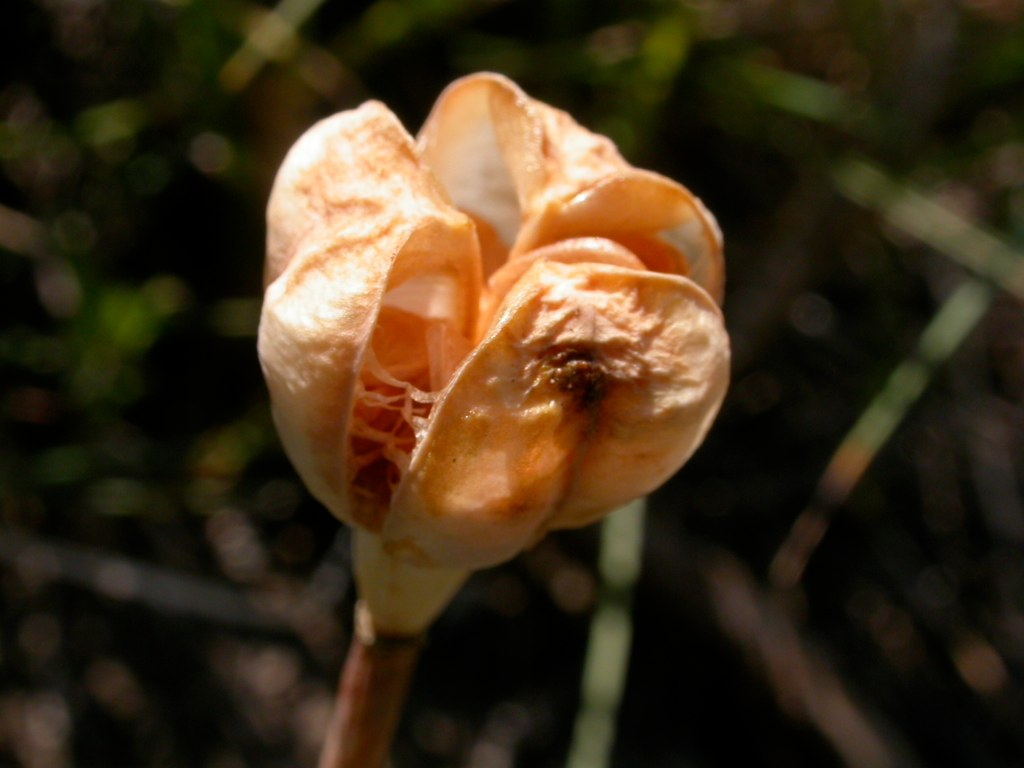
Fritillaria pudica: Trilocular fruit

== Subdivisions ==
=== Suprageneric subdivisions ===
Due to the diversity of the originally broadly defined Liliaceae (s.l.), many attempts have been made to form supageneric classification systems, organizing the genera into subfamilies, tribes, or other suprageneric taxa (taxonomic groupings between genus and family). By 1813, Candolle recognised five subdivisions which he called tribes (Asparagées, Trilliacées, Asphodelées, Bromeliées, Tulipacées), all of which Jussieu had made separate families, with the exception of Tulipa, which was a genus within the Liliaceae. By 1845, John Lindley observed that the family had become extremely diverse, ill-defined and unstable, not only by its overall circumscription, but also by its subdivisions. For the 133 genera he included, he described eleven suborders. By the 1870s, as Baker describes in his revision of the family, the taxonomy of Liliaceae had become vast and complicated. His approach was to divide the family into eight tribes.

In 1879, a revision of the North American Liliaceae by Sereno Watson described sixteen tribes, of which the Lilieae correspond most closely to current concepts of the family, Bentham and Hooker described twenty tribes in 1883, and Engler and Prantl in their extensive description of the Liliaceae in 1899 identified 31 tribes distributed over 11 subfamilies, with Tulipeae and Alieae representing the modern family. In 1936, Franz Buxbaum undertook a major revision of the Liliaceae and among others described the subfamily Lilioideae with three tribes: Lloydieae (Gagea, Lloydia and Szechenya and Giradiella — both now included in Lloydia), Tulipeae (Erythronium, Tulipa and Eduardoregalia — now part of Tulipa) and Lilieae (Korolkowia, Fritillaria, Notholirion, Cardiocrinum, Nomocharis and Lilium). Hutchinson included most of these genera within the tribe Tulipeae. The complex rearrangements of the various genera, tribes and subfamilies over a 30-year period from 1985, discussed by Peruzzi and colleagues (2009), are partly summarised in Table 2 below.

Classifications published since the use of molecular phylogenetics have taken a narrower view of the Liliaceae (s.s.). In 1998, Tamura considered Calochortus sufficiently distinct to elevate the subfamily Calochortoideae to family status as Calochortaceae, resulting in the term Liliaceae sensu Tamura to indicate Liliaceae without the Calochortoideae. In 2009, Takhtajan used an even narrower definition (see Table 2 & Table 3 below).

Despite now having established a taxonomic grouping for the family Liliaceae that is genetically monophyletic, compared to the prior longstanding polyphyletic assemblages under this name, the morphology remains diverse, and there exists within the Liliaceae clade a number of subclades. There appeared to be two major clades, the first and largest of these consisted of three subclades: Clintonia—Medeola—Gagea, Lilium Fritillaria—Notholirion, and Tulipa—Erythronium. The second smaller clade, Streptopus—Tricyrtis contained elements of Dahlgren's Uvulariaceae. The position of Calochortus remained problematic, being considered a sister clade to Liliaceae, as treated by Tamura, but further analysis suggested it was in fact sister to Tricyrtis, although it is now considered separate once again (see Table 3).

Also enigmatic were Clintonia, Medeola, Scoliopus, and Tricyrtis. Clintonia, with a disjunct distribution involving East Asia and North America, and the closely related Medeola form a subclades and are now considered a separate tribe (Medeoleae) within the Lilioideae, although at different times they have been considered a separate subfamily (Medeoloideae) or family (Medeolaceae). Sequencing of the rbcL and matK chloroplast genes established monophyly for Clintonia, but with separate clades corresponding to the two areas of distribution. The Angiosperm Phylogeny Website (APWeb) includes four of Takhtajan's families in Liliaceae, recognizing three subfamilies, one of which is divided into two tribes and referred to as Liliaceae sensu APG III.

Table 2: Comparison of Four 21st Century System Subdivisions of Liliaceae
Tamura			Takhtajan		Taxonomicon			APWeb		
Family	Subfamily	Tribe	Family	Tribe	Family	Subfamily	Tribe	Family	Subfamily	Tribe
Liliaceae	Lilioideae s.s.	Lilieae s.s.	Liliaceae	Lloydieae	Liliaceae	Lilioideae s.l.	Lloydieae	Liliaceae	Lilioideae s.l.	Lilieae s.l.
Liliaceae	Lilioideae s.s.	Lilieae s.s.	Liliaceae	Lilieae	Liliaceae	Lilioideae s.l.	Lilieae	Liliaceae	Lilioideae s.l.	Lilieae s.l.
Liliaceae	Lilioideae s.s.	Tulipeae	Liliaceae	Tulipeae	Liliaceae	Lilioideae s.l.	Tulipeae	Liliaceae	Lilioideae s.l.	Lilieae s.l.
Liliaceae	Medeoloideae		Medeolaceae		Liliaceae	Lilioideae s.l.	Medeola, Clintonia	Liliaceae	Lilioideae s.l.	Medeoleae
Calochortaceae		Calochorteae	Scoliopaceae		Liliaceae	Calochortoideae		Liliaceae	Calochortoideae	
Calochortaceae		Tricyrtideae	Tricyrtidaceae		Liliaceae	Streptopoideae		Liliaceae	Streptopoideae	

=== Genera ===
==== Historical treatment ====
Historically, the inclusion of genera within Liliaceae has been extremely broad. Of the various published systems, one of the best known and also the broadest modern circumscription is the Cronquist system (1981), which included nearly 300 genera in Liliaceae. Most of these have been reassigned to other families, as shown in the following collapsed list, following ITIS, together with their disposition as APG III transfers to other families and subfamilies, within Liliales and three other orders, Alismatales, Asparagales and Dioscoreales. Current members of Liliaceae are shown in bold.

List of disposition of genera previously included in Liliaceae

Genus	Authority	Family	Subfamily	Order
**List of genera included in Liliaceae by Cronquist**
Abama=Narthecium	Adans.			
Agapanthus	L'Her.	Amaryllidaceae	Agapanthoideae	Asparagales
Aletris	L.	Nartheciaceae		Dioscoreales
Allium	L.	Amaryllidaceae	Allioideae	Asparagales
Alstroemeria	L.	Alstroemeriaceae		Liliales
Amaryllis	L.	Amaryllidaceae	Amaryllidoideae	Asparagales
Amianthium	Gray	Melanthiaceae		Liliales
Androstephium	Torr.	Asparagaceae	Brodiaeoideae	Asparagales
Anthericum	L.	Asparagaceae	Agavoideae	Asparagales
Asparagus	L.	Asparagaceae	Asparagoideae	Asparagales
Asphodelus	L.	Xanthorrhoeaceae	Asphodeloideae	Asparagales
Astelia	Joseph Banks & Soland. ex R. Br.	Asteliaceae		Asparagales
Atamosco= Zephyranthes	Adans.			
Bloomeria	Kellogg	Asparagaceae	Brodiaeoideae	Asparagales
Brodiaea	Sm.	Asparagaceae	Brodiaeoideae	Asparagales
**Calochortus**	Pursh	Liliaceae		Liliales
Camassia	Lindl.	Asparagaceae	Agavoideae	Asparagales
**Cardiocrinum**	(Endl.) Lindl.	Liliaceae		Liliales
Chamaelirium	Willd.	Melanthiaceae		Liliales
Chionodoxa	Boiss.	Asparagaceae	Scilloideae	Asparagales
Chlorogalum	Kunth	Asparagaceae	Agavoideae	Asparagales
Chlorophytum	Ker-Gawl.	Asparagaceae	Agavoideae	Asparagales
**Clintonia**	Raf.	Liliaceae		Liliales
Colchicum	L.	Colchicaceae		Liliales
Convallaria	L.	Asparagaceae	Convallarioideae	Asparagales
Cooperia	Herb.	Amaryllidaceae	Amaryllidoideae	Asparagales
Cordyline	Comm. ex R. Br.	Asparagaceae	Lomandroideae	Asparagales
Crinum	L.	Amaryllidaceae	Amaryllidoideae	Asparagales
Curculigo	Gaertn.	Hypoxidaceae		Asparagales
Dasylirion	Zucc.	Asparagaceae	Convallarioideae	Asparagales
Dianella	Lam.	Xanthorrhoeaceae	Hemerocallidoideae	Asparagales
Dichelostemma	Kunth	Asparagaceae	Brodiaeoideae	Asparagales
Disporum (Note: Asian species. N American species restored as Prosartes D. Don)	Salisb. ex D. Don	Colchicaceae		Liliales
Dracaena	L.	Asparagaceae	Convallarioideae	Asparagales
Echeandia	Ortega	Asparagaceae	Agavoideae	Asparagales
Eremocrinum	M.E.Jones	Asparagaceae	Agavoideae	Asparagales
**Erythronium**	L.	Liliaceae		Liliales
Eucharis	Planch. & Lind.	Amaryllidaceae	Amaryllidoideae	Asparagales
**Fritillaria**	L.	Liliaceae		Liliales
**Gagea**	Salisb.	Liliaceae		Liliales
Galanthus	L.	Amaryllidaceae	Amaryllidoideae	Asparagales
Gloriosa	L.	Colchicaceae		Liliales
Habranthus	Herb.	Amaryllidaceae	Amaryllidoideae	Asparagales
Harperocallis	McDaniel	Tofieldiaceae		Alismatales
Hastingsia	S. Wats.	Asparagaceae	Agavoideae	Asparagales
Helonias	L.	Melanthiaceae		Asparagales
Hemerocallis	L.	Xanthorrhoeaceae	Hemerocallidoideae	Asparagales
Hesperanthes= Echeandia	S. Wats.			
Hesperocallis	Gray	Tofieldiaceae		Alismatales
Hesperoscordum= Triteleia	Lindl.			
Hippeastrum	Herb.	Amaryllidaceae	Amaryllidoideae	Asparagales
Hosta	Tratt.	Asparagaceae	Agavoideae	Asparagales
Hyacinthoides	Medik.	Asparagaceae	Scilloideae	Asparagales
Hyacinthus	L.	Asparagaceae	Scilloideae	Asparagales
Hymenocallis	Salisb.	Amaryllidaceae	Amaryllidoideae	Asparagales
Ipheion	Raf.	Amaryllidaceae	Allioideae	Asparagales
Kniphofia	Moench	Xanthorrhoeaceae	Asphodeloideae	Asparagales
Leucocrinum	Nutt. ex Gray	Asparagaceae	Lomandroideae	Asparagales
Leucojum	L.	Amaryllidaceae	Amaryllidoideae	Asparagales
**Lilium**	L.	Liliaceae		Liliales
Liriope	Lour.	Asparagaceae	Convallarioideae	Asparagales
Lloydia= **Gagea**	Salisb. ex Reichenb.			
Lophiola	Ker-Gawl.	Nartheciaceae		Dioscoreales
Lycoris	Herb.	Amaryllidaceae	Amaryllidoideae	Asparagales
Maianthemum	G.H. Weber ex Wiggers	Asparagaceae	Convallarioideae	Asparagales
**Medeola**	L.	Liliaceae		Liliales
Melanthium	L.	Melanthiaceae		Asparagales
Milla	Cav.	Asparagaceae	Brodiaeoideae	Asparagales
Muilla	S. Wats. ex Benth.	Asparagaceae	Brodiaeoideae	Asparagales
Muscari	P. Mill.	Asparagaceae	Scilloideae	Asparagales
Narcissus	L.	Amaryllidaceae	Amaryllidoideae	Asparagales
Narthecium	Huds.	Nartheciaceae		Dioscoreales
Nolina	Michx.	Asparagaceae	Convallarioideae	Asparagales
**Nomocharis**	Franch.	Liliaceae		Liliales
**Notholirion**	Wall. ex Boiss.	Liliaceae		Liliales
Nothoscordum	Kunth	Amaryllidaceae	Allioideae	Asparagales
Odontostomum	Torr.	Tecophilaeaceae		Asparagales
Ophiopogon	Ker-Gawl.	Asparagaceae	Convallarioideae	Asparagales
Ornithogalum	L.	Asparagaceae	Scilloideae	Asparagales
Pancratium	L.	Amaryllidaceae	Amaryllidoideae	Asparagales
Pleea	Michx.	Tofieldiaceae		Alismatales
Polygonatum	P. Mill.	Asparagaceae	Convallarioideae	Asparagales
Sansevieria	Thunb.	Asparagaceae	Convallarioideae	Asparagales
Schoenocaulon	Gray	Melanthiaceae		Liliales
Schoenolirion	Torr. ex Dur.	Asparagaceae	Agavoideae	Asparagales
Scilla	L.	Asparagaceae	Scilloideae	Asparagales
**Scoliopus**	Torr.	Liliaceae		Liliales
Smilacina=Maianthemum	Desf.			
Stenanthium	(Gray) Kunth	Melanthiaceae		LIliales
Sternbergia	Waldst. & Kit.	Amaryllidaceae	Amaryllidoideae	Asparagales
**Streptopus**	Michx.	Liliaceae		Liliales
Tofieldia	Huds.	Tofieldiaceae		Alismatales
**Tricyrtis**	Wall.	Liliaceae		Liliales
Trillium	L.	Melanthiaceae		Liliales
Tristagma	Poepp.	Amaryllidaceae	Allioideae	Asparagales
Triteleia	Dougl. ex Lindl.	Asparagaceae	Brodiaeoideae	Asparagales
Triteleiopsis	Hoover	Asparagaceae	Brodiaeoideae	Asparagales
**Tulipa**	L.	Liliaceae		Liliales
Urginea	Steinh.	Asparagaceae	Scilloideae	Asparagales
Uvularia	L.	Colchicaceae		Liliales
Vagnera=Maianthemum	Adans.			
Veratrum	L.	Melanthiaceae		Liliales
Xerophyllum	Michx.	Melanthiaceae		Liliales
Zephyranthes	Herb.	Amaryllidaceae	Amaryllidoideae	Asparagales
Zigadenus	Michx.	Melanthiaceae		Liliales
List of other genera historically included in Liliaceae s.l.
Albuca	L.	Asparagaceae	Scilloideae	Asparagales
Anticlea	Kunth	Melanthiaceae		Liliales
Arthropodium	R.Br.	Asparagaceae	Lomandroideae	Asparagales
Bellevalia	Lapeyr.	Asparagaceae	Scilloideae	Asparagales
Bomarea	Mirb.	Alstroemeriaceae		Liliales
Chionographis = Chamaelirium	Maxim.	Melanthiaceae		Liliales
Conanthera	Ruiz & Pav.	Tecophilaeaceae		Asparagales
Cyclobothra= **Calochortus**	D.Don			
Daiswa	Raf.	Melanthiaceae		Liliales
Drimia	Jacq.	Asparagaceae	Scilloideae	Asparagales
Drimiopsis	Lindl. & Paxton	Asparagaceae	Scilloideae	Asparagales
Eremurus	M.Bieb.	Xanthorrhoeaceae	Asphodeloideae	Asparagales
Eriospermum	Jacq.	Asparagaceae	Convallarioideae	Asparagales
Eucrosia	Ker Gawl.	Amaryllidaceae	Amaryllidoideae	Asparagales
Eustephia	Cav.	Amaryllidaceae	Amaryllidoideae	Asparagales
Griffinia	Ker Gawl.	Amaryllidaceae	Amaryllidoideae	Asparagales
Heloniopsis	A.Gray	Melanthiaceae		Liliales
Hemiphylacus	S.Wats.	Asparagaceae	Asparagoideae	Asparagales
Herreria	Ruiz & Pav.	Asparagaceae	Agavoideae	Asparagales
Hessea	Herb.	Amaryllidaceae	Amaryllidoideae	Asparagales
Hookera= Brodiaea	Salisb.			
Hypoxis	L.	Hypoxidaceae		Asparagales
Ismene	Salisb.	Amaryllidaceae	Amaryllidoideae	Asparagales
Jaimehintonia	B.L.Turner	Amaryllidaceae	Allioideae	Asparagales
Johnsonia	Mill.	Asparagaceae	Lomandroideae	Asparagales
Laxmannia	R.Br.	Asparagaceae	Lomandroideae	Asparagales
Lepidopharynx= Hippeastrum	Rusby			
Metanarthecium	Maxim.	Nartheciaceae		Dioscoreales
Miersia	Lindl.	Amaryllidaceae	Allioideae	Asparagales
Molineria	Colla	Hypoxidaceae		Asparagales
Nietneria	Klotzsch	Melanthiaceae		Liliales
Paradisea	Mazzuc.	Anthericaceae		Asparagales
Paris	L.	Melanthiaceae		Liliales
Peliosanthes	Andrews	Asparagaceae	Convallarioideae	Asparagales
Phaedranassa	Herb.	Amaryllidaceae	Amaryllidoideae	Asparagales
Selonia= Eremurus	Regel			
Stropholirion= Dichelostemma	Torr.			
Theropogon	Maxim.	Amaryllidaceae	Allioideae	Asparagales
Tovaria= Maianthemum	Neck.	Asparagaceae	Convallarioideae	Asparagales
Toxicoscordion	Rydb.	Melanthiaceae		Liliales
Tracyanthus= Stenanthium	Small			
Tulbaghia	Heist.	Amaryllidaceae	Allioideae	Asparagales
Tupistra	Ker Gawl.	Asparagaceae	Convallarioideae	Asparagales
Urceolina	Rchb.	Amaryllidaceae	Amaryllidoideae	Asparagales
Wurmbea	Thunb.	Colchicaceae		Liliales

The more modern phylogenetically based treatment of the genera, including the major systems of the 1980s of Dahlgren and Tamura, are shown in Table 3.

Table 3: Historical distribution of Liliaceae sensu APWeb/APG ("core Liliales") genera by family and author with subsequent subfamilial divisions
Genera	sensu Dahlgren (1985) (tribes)	sensu Tamura (1998) subfamilies (tribes)	sensu APG	Tribes			Subfamilies
Streptopus	Uvulariaceae (Uvularieae)	Calochortaceae (Tricyrtideae)	Liliaceae^{5}				Streptopoideae syn. Scoliopaceae Takht.
Scoliopus	Trilliaceae^{1}	Calochortaceae (Tricyrtideae)	Liliaceae				Streptopoideae syn. Scoliopaceae Takht.
Prosartes	Uvulariaceae (Uvularieae)	Calochortaceae (Tricyrtideae)	Liliaceae				Streptopoideae syn. Scoliopaceae Takht.
Calochortus	Calochortaceae	Calochortaceae (Calochorteae)	Liliaceae				Calochortoideae syn. Calochortaceae Dumort., Compsoaceae Horan., nom. illeg., Tricyrtidaceae Takht., nom. cons.
Tricyrtis^{6}	Uvulariaceae (Tricyrtideae)	Calochortaceae (Tricyrtideae)	Liliaceae				Calochortoideae syn. Calochortaceae Dumort., Compsoaceae Horan., nom. illeg., Tricyrtidaceae Takht., nom. cons.
Medeola	Trilliaceae^{1}	Liliaceae; Medeolioideae	Liliaceae	Medeoleae syn. Medeolioideae (Tamura), Medeolaceae Takht., Medeoloideae Benth.			Lilioideae s.l.^{3}
Clintonia	Uvulariaceae (Uvularieae)	Liliaceae; Medeolioideae	Liliaceae	Medeoleae syn. Medeolioideae (Tamura), Medeolaceae Takht., Medeoloideae Benth.			Lilioideae s.l.^{3}
Cardiocrinum	Liliaceae	Liliaceae; Lilioideae (Lilieae)	Liliaceae	Lilieae s.s. (Tamura)		Lilieae s.l. syn. Lilioideae s.s. (Tamura),^{3} Erythroniaceae Martinov, Fritillariaceae Salisb., Liriaceae Borkh., Tulipaceae Borkh.	Lilioideae s.l.^{3}
Notholirion	Liliaceae	Liliaceae; Lilioideae (Liliae)	Liliaceae	Lilieae s.s. (Tamura)		Lilieae s.l. syn. Lilioideae s.s. (Tamura),^{3} Erythroniaceae Martinov, Fritillariaceae Salisb., Liriaceae Borkh., Tulipaceae Borkh.	Lilioideae s.l.^{3}
Nomocharis^{2}	Liliaceae	Liliaceae; Lilioideae (Lilieae)	Liliaceae	Lilieae s.s. (Tamura)		Lilieae s.l. syn. Lilioideae s.s. (Tamura),^{3} Erythroniaceae Martinov, Fritillariaceae Salisb., Liriaceae Borkh., Tulipaceae Borkh.	Lilioideae s.l.^{3}
Fritillaria	Liliaceae	Liliaceae; Lilioideae (Lilieae)	Liliaceae	Lilieae s.s. (Tamura)		Lilieae s.l. syn. Lilioideae s.s. (Tamura),^{3} Erythroniaceae Martinov, Fritillariaceae Salisb., Liriaceae Borkh., Tulipaceae Borkh.	Lilioideae s.l.^{3}
Lilium	Liliaceae	Liliaceae; Lilioideae (Lilieae)	Liliaceae	Lilieae s.s. (Tamura)		Lilieae s.l. syn. Lilioideae s.s. (Tamura),^{3} Erythroniaceae Martinov, Fritillariaceae Salisb., Liriaceae Borkh., Tulipaceae Borkh.	Lilioideae s.l.^{3}
Gagea	Liliaceae	Liliaceae; Lilioideae (Tulipeae)	Liliaceae	Lloydieae	Tulipeae s.l. (Tamura)^{4}	Lilieae s.l. syn. Lilioideae s.s. (Tamura),^{3} Erythroniaceae Martinov, Fritillariaceae Salisb., Liriaceae Borkh., Tulipaceae Borkh.	Lilioideae s.l.^{3}
Lloydia^{2}	Liliaceae	Liliaceae; Lilioideae (Tulipeae)	Liliaceae	Lloydieae	Tulipeae s.l. (Tamura)^{4}	Lilieae s.l. syn. Lilioideae s.s. (Tamura),^{3} Erythroniaceae Martinov, Fritillariaceae Salisb., Liriaceae Borkh., Tulipaceae Borkh.	Lilioideae s.l.^{3}
Amana^{2}	Liliaceae	Liliaceae; Lilioideae (Tulipeae)	Liliaceae	Tulipeae s.s.	Tulipeae s.l. (Tamura)^{4}	Lilieae s.l. syn. Lilioideae s.s. (Tamura),^{3} Erythroniaceae Martinov, Fritillariaceae Salisb., Liriaceae Borkh., Tulipaceae Borkh.	Lilioideae s.l.^{3}
Tulipa	Liliaceae	Liliaceae; Lilioideae (Tulipeae)	Liliaceae	Tulipeae s.s.	Tulipeae s.l. (Tamura)^{4}	Lilieae s.l. syn. Lilioideae s.s. (Tamura),^{3} Erythroniaceae Martinov, Fritillariaceae Salisb., Liriaceae Borkh., Tulipaceae Borkh.	Lilioideae s.l.^{3}
Erythronium	Liliaceae	Liliaceae; Lilioideae (Tulipeae)	Liliaceae	Tulipeae s.s.	Tulipeae s.l. (Tamura)^{4}	Lilieae s.l. syn. Lilioideae s.s. (Tamura),^{3} Erythroniaceae Martinov, Fritillariaceae Salisb., Liriaceae Borkh., Tulipaceae Borkh.	Lilioideae s.l.^{3}
1. Dahlgren expressed some uncertainty as to whether to include these genera in Trilliaceae or Uvulariaceae, tribus Uvularieae; 2. Some authorities embed Nomocharis within Lilium, and Lloydia within Gagea. Amana had been embedded in Tulipa but was subsequently restored as a separate genus.; 3. In Tamura's classification Lilioideae is used s.s. (Tulipeae s.l. and Lilieae s.s.), whereas in APWeb it is used s.l. to also include Medeoleae. Thus Lilioideae s.s. is equivalent to Lilieae s.l.; 4. While Tulipae s.l. is embedded in Lilieae s.l. in APWeb, many authors support it as a separate taxon 5. "Core Liliales" corresponds to Liliaceae sensu APG, incorporating all genera shown here 6. Tricyrtis is probably not a sister clade to Calochortus, and may represent a further subfamily separate from Calochortoideae

==== Modern subfamilial divisions within Liliaceae ====
The evolutionary and phylogenetic relationships between the genera currently included in Liliaceae are shown in Cladogram III.

Cladogram III: Phylogeny and biogeography of the genera of the Liliaceae

- Liliaceae
  - - West NA
      - Tricyrtis
      - - Streptopoideae
          - Streptopus
          - - Prosartes
            - Scoliopus
  - - West NA
      Calochortus
    - Lilioideae* East NA EA
      - Medeoleae East NA
        - Clintonia
        - Medeola
      - Lilieae s.l. EA
        - Tulipeae East Asia
          - - Tulipa
            - - Amana
              - Erythronium
          - - Gagea (Lloydia)
        - Lilieae s.s. Himalayas
          - Notholirion
          - - Cardiocrinum
            - - Lilium (Nomocharis)
              - Fritillaria

Phylogenetic tree reflecting relationships based on molecular phylogenetic evidence.
*=Liliaceae sensu Tamura; EA=Eurasia NA=North America

The largest genera are Gagea (200), Fritillaria (130), Lilium (110), and Tulipa (75 species), all within the tribe Lilieae. Various authorities (e.g. ITIS 16, GRIN 27, WCSP, NCBI, DELTA) differ on the exact number of genera included in Liliaceae s.s., but generally there are about fifteen to sixteen genera, depending on whether or not Amana is included in Tulipa and Lloydia in Gagea. For instance Amana is still listed separately in WCSP.

The exact subdivision of Liliaceae differs between authors. In 2002 Patterson and Givnish identified two major clades corresponding to Tamura's Calochortaceae and Liliaceae, but preferred to retain his original division into two separate families rather than the overarching "core Liliales" (Liliaceae sensu APG). Within Liliaceae sensu Tamura they confirmed his decision to include Medeola-Clintonia as a separate subfamily, Medeolioideae, with the remaining genera as subfamily Lilioideae. Liliodeae was then divided into two tribes, Lilieae and Tulipeae (Tulipa, Erythronium, Gagea, Lloydia). Within Calochortaceae sensu Tamura, they proposed erecting a second subfamily, Streptopoideae (Prosartes, Scoliopus, Streptopus), with the remaining genera in subfamily Calochortoideae. Subsequent work by Rønsted et al. (2005) and by Fay et al. (2006) confirmed the overall phylogenetic relationships of Patterson and Givnish and their subdivisions, and further elucidated the position of Gagea within the tribe Tulipae, but the latter authors restored the broader circumscription of Liliaceae sensu APG . In 2013, Kim et al. proposed further subdivision, placing the two genera of Calochortoideae (Calochortus and Tricyrtis) into subfamilies of their own and splitting off Gagea from the rest of Tulipeae by resurrecting the tribe Lloydieae. (see Table 3)

The best known schema, the APWeb, lists fifteen genera, arranged as follows, and illustrated in Table 4, with three subfamilies, Lilioideae representing Liliaceae sensu Tamura and the two subfamilies of Calochortaceae sensu Tamura (Streptopoideae and Calochortoideae) as proposed by Patterson and Givnish now included within Lilaceae sensu APG.

Table 4: APWeb/APG Distribution of Subfamilies, Tribes and Genera of Liliaceae with illustration of morphological diversity
Subfamily	Tribe		Genus
Lilioideae Eaton	Medeoleae Benth.	Clintonia borealis	Clintonia Raf. - bead lilies
Lilioideae Eaton	Medeoleae Benth.	Clintonia borealis	Medeola Gronov. ex L. - Indian cucumber-root
Lilioideae Eaton	Lilieae s.l. Ritgen	Cardiocrinum giganteum Gagea lutea^{1,2} Erythronium sibiricum^{1}	Cardiocrinum (Endl.) Lindl. - giant lilies
Lilioideae Eaton	Lilieae s.l. Ritgen	Cardiocrinum giganteum Gagea lutea^{1,2} Erythronium sibiricum^{1}	Fritillaria Tourn. ex L. – fritillary or mission bells
Lilioideae Eaton	Lilieae s.l. Ritgen	Cardiocrinum giganteum Gagea lutea^{1,2} Erythronium sibiricum^{1}	Gagea Salisb. (including Lloydia Salisb. ex Rchb.) – yellow star-of-Bethlehem^{1,2}
Lilioideae Eaton	Lilieae s.l. Ritgen	Cardiocrinum giganteum Gagea lutea^{1,2} Erythronium sibiricum^{1}	Lilium Tourn. ex L. – lily
Lilioideae Eaton	Lilieae s.l. Ritgen	Cardiocrinum giganteum Gagea lutea^{1,2} Erythronium sibiricum^{1}	Nomocharis Franch.
Lilioideae Eaton	Lilieae s.l. Ritgen	Cardiocrinum giganteum Gagea lutea^{1,2} Erythronium sibiricum^{1}	Notholirion Wall. ex Boiss.
Lilioideae Eaton	Lilieae s.l. Ritgen	Cardiocrinum giganteum Gagea lutea^{1,2} Erythronium sibiricum^{1}	Tulipa L. (including Amana Honda) – tulip^{1}
Lilioideae Eaton	Lilieae s.l. Ritgen	Cardiocrinum giganteum Gagea lutea^{1,2} Erythronium sibiricum^{1}	Erythronium L. – trout lily^{1}
Calochortoideae Dumort.^{3}		Calochortus catalinae Tricyrtis hirta	Calochortus Pursh - mariposa, globe lilies
Calochortoideae Dumort.^{3}		Calochortus catalinae Tricyrtis hirta	Tricyrtis Wall. – toad lily
Streptopoideae		Prosartes hookeri	Prosartes D.Don – drops of gold
Streptopoideae		Prosartes hookeri	Scoliopus Torr. – Fetid Adder's Tongue
Streptopoideae		Prosartes hookeri	Streptopus Michx. – twistedstalk
1. Some classifications place Tulipa, Erythronium and Gagea into a separate tribe, Tulipeae with the remaining genera in Lilieae s.s.; 2. Other authorities place Gagea within its own tribe, Lloydieae; 3. The situation with respect to Calochortoideae remains uncertain. Originally Calochortus and Tricyrtis were considered to be sister clades and placed together in subfamily Calochortoideae. Further study has not confirmed this (see Cladogram III, below) and it has been proposed that Tricyrtis be placed in a separate subfamily.

== Etymology ==
The name Liliaceae was coined by Michel Adanson in 1763. The name was derived from Lilium and the family suffix -aceae. Lilium is the type genus of the family, which is the Latin for Lily, which in turn came from the Greek name for it, λείριον (leírion).

== See also ==
- List of systems of plant taxonomy
- Phylogenetic nomenclature

== Bibliography ==
=== Books ===
- Kamenetsky, Rina; Okubo, Hiroshi, eds. (2012). Ornamental Geophytes: From Basic Science to Sustainable Production. CRC Press. ISBN 978-1-4398-4924-8.
- Mabberley, David J (2013). Mabberley's Plant-Book (3 ed.). Cambridge University Press. ISBN 978-1-107-78259-4.
- Redouté, P. J. (1802–1816). Les liliacées. Paris: Redouté.

==== Paleobotany ====
- Friis, Else Marie; Crane, Peter R.; Pedersen, Kaj Raunsgaard (2011). Early Flowers and Angiosperm Evolution. Cambridge University Press. ISBN 978-1-139-49638-4.
- Goin, Francisco; Hospitaleche, Carolina Acosta; Dutra, Tania; Marenssi, Sergio (2012). Late Cretaceous/Paleogene West Antarctica Terrestrial Biota and its Intercontinental Affinities. Springer. ISBN 978-94-007-5491-1.
- Stilwell, Jeffrey D.; Feldmann, Rodney M., eds. (2000). Paleobiology and Paleoenvironments of Eocene Rocks: McMurdo Sound, East Antarctica. American Geophysical Union. ISBN 978-0-87590-947-9.
- Vakhrameev, V.A. (1991) [1988]. Hughes, Norman F. (ed.). Yurskiye i melovyye flory: klimaty Zemly [Jurassic and Cretaceous floras and climates of the earth] (in Russian). translated by Ju. V. Litvinov, originally published by Nauka, Moscow. Cambridge: Cambridge University Press. ISBN 978-0-521-40291-0.

==== Systematics and taxonomy ====
- Bremer, Kåre; Bremer, B.; Thulin, M. (1997) [1995, 1996]. Introduction to Phylogeny and Systematics of Flowering Plants (3rd ed.). Uppsala University. (7th ed. 2003 ISBN 9789155458287)
- Datta, Subhash Chandra (1988). Systematic Botany (4 ed.). New Delhi: New Age Intl. ISBN 978-81-224-0013-7.
- Davis, Peter Hadland; Heywood, Vernon Hilton (1963). Principles of angiosperm taxonomy. Edinburgh: Oliver & Boyd.
- Gledhill, David (2006). The names of plants (4 ed.). Cambridge: Cambridge University Press. ISBN 978-0-521-86645-3.
- Jeffrey, Charles (1982) [1968]. An introduction to plant taxonomy (2nd ed.). Cambridge: Cambridge University Press. ISBN 978-0-521-28775-3.
- Judd, Walter S.; Campbell, Christopher S.; Kellogg, Elizabeth A.; Stevens, Peter F.; Donoghue, Michael J. (2007) [1999]. Plant systematics: a phylogenetic approach (3rd (2nd. 2002) ed.). Sinauer Associates. ISBN 978-0-87893-407-2.
- Kerner von Marilaun, Anton (1895–1896) [1890–1891]. Pflanzenleben [The natural history of plants, their forms, growth, reproduction, and distribution]. Translated by FW Oliver et al. New York: Holt. p. vol 4: 603.
- Kubitzki, Klaus, ed. (1977). Flowering Plants: Evolution and classification of higher categories. Symposium, Hamburg, September 8–12, 1976. Plant Systematics & Evolution - Supplementum 1. Wien: Springer. p. 416. ISBN 978-3-211-81434-5.
- Leadlay, Etelka; Jury, Stephen, eds. (2006). Taxonomy and plant conservation: the cornerstone of the conservation and the sustainable use of plants. Cambridge: Cambridge University Press. ISBN 978-0-521-84506-9.
- Naikh, V.N. (1984). Taxonomy of Angiosperms. New Delhi: Tata McGraw-Hill Education. ISBN 978-0-07-451788-8.
- Spichiger, Rodolphe; Perret, Mathieu, eds. (2002). Botanique systématique des plantes à fleurs: une approche phylogénétique nouvelle des angiospermes des régions tempérées et tropicales [Systematic Botany of Flowering Plants 2004]. Lausanne: Science Publishers. ISBN 978-1-57808-373-2.
- Sambamurty, A. V. S. S. (2005). Taxonomy of angiosperms. New Delhi: I.K. International. ISBN 978-81-88237-16-6.
- Simpson, Michael G. (2011). Plant Systematics. Academic Press. ISBN 978-0-08-051404-8.
- Singh, Gurcharan (2004). Plant Systematics: An Integrated Approach. Science Publishers. ISBN 978-1-57808-351-0.
- Stevens, Peter Francis (2013). The Development of Biological Systematics: Antoine-Laurent de Jussieu, Nature, and the Natural System. Columbia University Press, 2013. ISBN 978-0-231-51508-5.
- Soltis, D.E.; Soltis, P.F.; Endress, P.K.; Chase, M.W. (2005). Phylogeny and evolution of angiosperms. Sunderland, MA: Sinauer. ISBN 978-1-58834-201-0. excerpts
- Stace, Clive A. (1989) [1980]. Plant taxonomy and biosystematics (2nd. ed.). Cambridge: Cambridge University Press. ISBN 978-0-521-42785-2.
- Stuessy, Tod F. (2009). Plant Taxonomy: The Systematic Evaluation of Comparative Data. Columbia University Press. ISBN 978-0-231-14712-5.
- Lawrence, G. H. M. (1951). Taxonomy of vascular plants. New York: Macmillan.
- Walters, Dirk R.; Keil, David J. (1996). Vascular Plant Taxonomy. Kendall Hunt. ISBN 978-0-7872-2108-9.
- Wilkin, Paul; Mayo, Simon J, eds. (2013). Early events in monocot evolution. Cambridge: Cambridge University Press. ISBN 978-1-107-01276-9.
- Williams, D. M.; Knapp, Sandra, eds. (2010). Beyond Cladistics: The Branching of a Paradigm. University of California Press. ISBN 978-0-520-26772-5.

==== Taxonomic classifications (chronological) ====
- Linnaeus, C. (1753). Species Plantarum. Stockholm: Laurentii Salvii.
- Adanson, Michel (1763). Familles des plantes. Paris: Vincent.

Table of 58 families, Part II: Page 1
Table of 1615 genera, Part II: Page 8

- de Jussieu, Antoine Laurent (1778). "Examen de la famille des Renoncules". Histoire de l'Académie Royale des Sciences Avec les Mémoires de Mathématique et Physique Année 1773. 1: 214–240.
- Jussieu, Antoine Laurent de (1789). Genera Plantarum, secundum ordines naturales disposita juxta methodum in Horto Regio Parisiensi exaratam (in Latin). Paris: apud viduam Herissant et Theophilum Barrois. OCLC 5161409.
- Candolle, A. P. de (1813). Théorie élémentaire de la botanique, ou exposition des principes de la classification naturelle et de l'art de décrire et d'etudier les végétaux (in French).
- Gray, Samuel Frederick (1821). A natural arrangement of British plants: according to their relations to each other as pointed out by Jussieu, De Candolle, Brown, &c. including those cultivated for use; with an introduction to botany, in which the terms newly introduced are explained. London: Baldwin.
- Lindley, John (1830). An introduction to the natural system of botany : or, A systematic view of the organisation, natural affinities, and geographical distribution, of the whole vegetable kingdom: together with the uses of the most important species in medicine, the arts, and rural or domestic economy. London: Longman.
- Lindley, John (1846). The Vegetable Kingdom: or, The structure, classification, and uses of plants, illustrated upon the natural system. London: Bradbury.
- Bentham, G.; Hooker, J.D. (1862–1883). Genera plantarum ad exemplaria imprimis in herbariis kewensibus servata definita (in Latin). London: L Reeve & Co.
- Baker, JG (1871). "A revision of the genera and species of herbaceous gamophyllous Liliaceae". Journal of the Linnean Society, Botany. 11 (54–55): 349–436. doi:10.1111/j.1095-8339.1870.tb00068.x. hdl:2027/hvd.32044106471428.
- Baker, JG (1873). "Revision of the genera and species of Scilleae and Chlorogaleae". Journal of the Linnean Society, Botany. 13 (68): 209–292. doi:10.1111/j.1095-8339.1872.tb00093.x.
- Eichler, August W. (1886) [1876]. Syllabus der Vorlesungen über specielle und medicinisch-pharmaceutische Botanik (in German) (4th ed.). Berlin: Borntraeger.
- Engler, Adolf; Prantl, Karl, eds. (1888). Die Natürlichen Pflanzenfamilien nebst ihren Gattungen und wichtigeren Arten, insbesondere den Nutzpflanzen, unter Mitwirkung zahlreicher hervorragender Fachgelehrten 1887–1915 II(5) (in German). Leipzig: W. Engelmann.
- Engler, Adolf, ed. (1900–1968). Das Pflanzenreich: regni vegetablilis conspectus (in German). Leipzig: Engelmann.
- Engler, Adolf (1903) [1892]. Syllabus der Pflanzenfamilien: eine Übersicht über das gesamte Pflanzensystem mit Berücksichtigung der Medicinal- und Nutzpflanzen nebst einer Übersicht über die Florenreiche und Florengebiete der Erde zum Gebrauch bei Vorlesungen und Studien über specielle und medicinisch-pharmaceutische Botanik (in German) (3rd ed.). Berlin: Borntraeger.
- Wettstein, Richard (1924). Handbuch der Systematischen Botanik 2 vols (in German) (3rd ed.). Archived from the original on 18 February 2015.
- Lotsy, Johannes Paulus (1907–1911). Vorträge über botanische Stammesgeschichte, gehalten an der Reichsuniversität zu Leiden. Ein Lehrbuch der Pflanzensystematik (in German). Jena: Fischer.
- Carter, Humphrey G. (1913). Genera of British plants arranged according to Engler's Syllabus der pflanzenfamilien (7 ed.). Cambridge University Press.
- Bessey, Charles E. (1915). "The Phylogenetic Taxonomy of Flowering Plants". Annals of the Missouri Botanical Garden. 2 (1/2 Feb–Apr): 109–164. doi:10.2307/2990030. JSTOR 2990030.
- Hutchinson, John (1959) [1926–1934]. The families of flowering plants, arranged according to a new system based on their probable phylogeny. 2 vols (2nd ed.). Macmillan.
- Huber, H (1969). "Die Samenmerkmale und Verwandtschaftsverhältnisse der Liliifloren". Mitt. Bot. Staatssamml.[Mitteilungen der Botanischen Staatssammlung München] (in German). 8: 219–538.
- Cronquist, A (1981). An integrated system of classification of flowering plants. New York: Columbia University Press. ISBN 978-0-231-03880-5.
- Dahlgren, Rolf; Clifford, H. T. (1982). The monocotyledons: A comparative study. London and New York: Academic Press.
- Dahlgren, R.M.; Clifford, H.T.; Yeo, P.F. (1985). The families of the monocotyledons. Berlin: Springer-Verlag. ISBN 978-3-642-64903-5.
- Kubitzki, Klaus; Huber, Herbert, eds. (1998). The families and genera of vascular plants. Vol.3. Flowering plants. Monocotyledons: Lilianae (except Orchidaceae). Berlin, Germany: Springer-Verlag. ISBN 978-3-540-64060-8.
- Takhtajan, Armen Leonovich (1966). "Lilianae". Система и филогения цветкорых растений (Sistema i filogeniia tsvetkovykh rastenii) [Systema et Phylogemia Magnoliophytorum] (in Russian). trans. C Jeffrey, as Flowering plants: Origin and dispersal, Edinburgh : Oliver and Boyd, 1969. Moscow: Наука. p. 473. ISBN 978-0-05-001715-9.
- Takhtadzhi︠a︡n, Armen Leonovich (2009). Flowering Plants. New York: Springer. ISBN 978-1-4020-9609-9.
- Bremer, K.; Bremer, B.; Thulin, M. (1996–2005). "Classification of flowering plants". Archived from the original on 5 March 2016.

=== Chapters ===
- Chase, M. W.; Duvall, M. R.; Hills, H. G.; Conran, J. G.; Cox, A. V.; Eguiarte, L. E.; Hartwell, J.; Fay, M. F.; Caddick, L. R.; Cameron, K. M.; Hoot, S. Molecular phylogenetics of Lilianae. Vol. 1. pp. 109–137. In Rudall et al. (1995).
- Chase, M. W.; Stevenson, D. W.; Wilkin, P.; Rudall, P. J. Monocot systematics: A combined analysis. Vol. 2. pp. 685–730., In Rudall et al. (1995)
- Chase, M.W.; Soltis, D. E.; Soltis, P. S.; Rudall, P. J.; Fay, M. F.; Hahn, W. H.; Sullivan, S.; Joseph, J.; Molvray, M.; Kores, P. J.; Givnish, T. J.; Sytsma, K. J.; Pires, J. C. (2000). Higher-level systematics of the monocotyledons: An assessment of current knowledge and a new classification. pp. 3–16., in Wilson & Morrison (2000)
- Dahlgren, Rolf. A commentary on a diagrammatic presentation of the angiosperms in relation to the distribution of character states. pp. 253–284. in Kubitzki (1977)
- Davis, Jerrold I.; Mcneal, Joel R.; Barrett, Craig F.; Chase, Mark W.; Cohen, James I.; Duvall, Melvin R.; Givnish, Thomas J.; Graham, Sean W.; Petersen, Gitte; Pires, J. Chris; Seberg, Ole; Stevenson, Dennis W.; Leebens-Mack, Jim (2013), "Contrasting patterns of support among plastid genes and genomes for major clades of the monocotyledons", Early Events in Monocot Evolution, pp. 315–349, doi:10.1017/CBO9781139002950.015, ISBN 978-1-139-00295-0, in Wilkin & Mayo (2013)
- Fay, M.F.; Rudall, PJ; Sullivan, S; Stobart, KL; de Bruijn, AY; Reeves, G; Qamaruz-Zaman, F; Hong, W-P; Joseph, J; Hahn, WJ; Conran, JG; Chase, MW (2000-05-19). Phylogenetic studies of Asparagales based on four plastid DNA regions. Csiro. pp. 360–371. ISBN 978-0-643-09929-6., in Wilson & Morrison (2000)
- Fay, M. F.; Chase, M. W.; Ronsted, N.; Devey, D. S.; Pillon, Y.; Pires, J. C.; Petersen, G.; Seberg, O.; Davis, J. I. Phylogenetics of Liliales: summarized evidence from combined analyses of five plastid and one mitochondrial loci. pp. 559–565. In Columbus et al. (2006)
- Givnish, T.J.; Pires, J.C.; Graham, S.W.; McPherson, M.A.; Prince, L.M.; Patterson, T.B.; Rai, H.S.; Roalson, E.R.; Evans, T.M.; Hahn, W.J; Millam, K.C.; Meerow, A.W.; Molvray, M.; Kores, P.; O'Brien, H.E.; Kress, W.J.; Hall, J.; Sytsma, K.J. Phylogeny of the monocotyledons based on the highly informative plastid gene ndhF: evidence for widespread concerted convergence (PDF). pp. 28–51. Archived from the original (PDF) on 16 January 2014. In Columbus et al. (2006)
- Goldblatt, P. The status of R. Dahlgren's orders Liliales and Melanthiales. pp. 181–200. In Rudall et al. (1995)
- Kubitzki, K; Rudall, PJ; Chase, MC. Systematics and evolution: A brief history of monocot classification. p. 23. In Kubitzki & Huber (1998).
- Meerow, A.W. (2012-09-17). Taxonomy and Phylogeny: Liliaceae. CRC Press. pp. 17–55. ISBN 978-1-4398-4924-8. In Kamenetsky & Okubo (2012)
- Rasmussen, F. N. (1985). "Superorder Liliiflorae". The Families of the Monocotyledons. pp. 107–274. doi:10.1007/978-3-642-61663-1_11. ISBN 978-3-642-64903-5. In Dahlgren, Clifford & Yeo (1985). See also Superorder Liliiflorae, p. 112, at Google Books for further excerpts
- Rudall, P. J.; Stobart, K. L.; Hong, W-P.; Conran, J. G.; Furness, C. A.; Kite, G. C.; Chase, M. W. (2000-05-19). Consider the lilies: systematics of Liliales. Csiro. pp. 347–359. ISBN 978-0-643-09929-6. In Wilson & Morrison (2000)
- Stevenson, D.W.; Loconte, H. Cladistic analysis of monocot families. pp. 543–578. in Rudall et al. (1995)
- Stevenson, D.W.; Davis, J.I.; Freudenstein, J.V.; Hardy, C.R.; Simmons, M.P.; Specht, C.D. A phylogenetic analysis of the monocotyledons based on morphological and molecular character sets, with comments on the placement of Acorus and Hydatellaceae (PDF). pp. 17–24. Archived from the original (PDF) on 2015-09-11. In Wilson & Morrison (2000)
- Tamura, M. N. (1998-08-27). "Calochortaceae". Flowering Plants · Monocotyledons. pp. 164–172. doi:10.1007/978-3-662-03533-7_22. ISBN 978-3-540-64060-8. In Kubitzki & Huber (1998).
- Tamura, M. N. (1998-08-27). "Liliaceae". Flowering Plants · Monocotyledons. pp. 343–353. doi:10.1007/978-3-662-03533-7_41. ISBN 978-3-540-64060-8. S2CID 243791987. In Kubitzki & Huber (1998). Additional excerpts
- Williams, David M; Bremer, Kare; Knapp, Sandra. Chris Humphries, Cladistics and Connections. pp. 19–33. In Williams & Knapp (2010)

=== Articles ===
- Buxbaum, F. (1936). "Die Entwicklungslinien der Lilioideae. I. Die systematische Stellung der gattung Gagea". Botanisches Archiv (in German). 38: 213–293.
- Buxbaum, F. (1937). "Die Entwicklungslinien der Lilioideae. II. Die Wurmbaeoideae". Botanisches Archiv (in German). 38: 305–398.
- Chase, Mark W.; Reveal, James L.; Fay, Michael F. (2009). "A subfamilial classification for the expanded asparagalean families Amaryllidaceae, Asparagaceae and Xanthorrhoeaceae". Botanical Journal of the Linnean Society. 161 (2): 132–136. doi:10.1111/j.1095-8339.2009.00999.x.
- Elwan, Zeinab A . (2008). "On the taxonomy of Gagea and Calochortus (Liliaceae): Evidences from macromophological aspects and cuticular features of leaf" (PDF). Research Journal of Agriculture and Biological Sciences. 4 (1): 1–15.
- Kelch, D. G. (2002). "Consider the Lilies" (PDF). Fremontia. 30 (2): 23–29. Archived from the original (PDF) on 2014-02-21.
- Mathew, Brian (1989). "Splitting the Liliaceae". The Plantsman. 11 (2): 89–105.
- Reveal, James L (18 June 2010). "A checklist of familial and suprafamilial names for extant vascular plants". Phytotaxa. 6: 1–402. doi:10.11646/phytotaxa.6.1.1.
- Schnarf, Karl (September 1948). "Der Umfang der Lilioideae im natürlichen System". Österreichische Botanische Zeitschrift. 95 (3): 257–269. doi:10.1007/BF01249968. ISSN 0378-2697. S2CID 37967024.
- Takhtajan, Armen (1980). "Outline of the classification of flowering plants (Magnoliophya)". Botanical Review. 46 (3): 225–359. Bibcode:1980BotRv..46..225T. doi:10.1007/BF02861558. S2CID 30764910.
- Thorne, R. F. (1992). "Classification and geography of the flowering plants". The Botanical Review. 58 (3): 225–348. Bibcode:1992BotRv..58..225T. doi:10.1007/BF02858611. S2CID 40348158.
- Thorne, Robert F.; Reveal, James L. (April 2007). "An Updated Classification of the Class Magnoliopsida ("Angiospermae")". The Botanical Review. 73 (2): 67–181. doi:10.1663/0006-8101(2007)73[67:AUCOTC]2.0.CO;2. S2CID 24415895.
- Watson, Sereno (1879). "Revision of the North American Liliaceae: Descriptions of Some New Species of North American Plants". Proceedings of the American Academy of Arts and Sciences. XIV: 213–312. doi:10.2307/25138538. JSTOR 25138538.

==== Phylogenetics ====
- Bremer, Kåre; Wanntorp, Hans-Erik (Aug 1978). "Phylogenetic Systematics in Botany". Taxon. 27 (4): 317–329. doi:10.2307/1220367. JSTOR 1220367.
- Chase, Mark W.; Soltis, Douglas E.; Olmstead, Richard G.; Morgan, David; Les, Donald H.; Mishler, Brent D.; Duvall, Melvin R.; Price, Robert A.; Hills, Harold G.; Qiu, Yin-Long; Kron, Kathleen A.; Rettig, Jeffrey H.; Conti, Elena; Palmer, Jeffrey D.; Manhart, James R.; Sytsma, Kenneth J.; Michaels, Helen J.; Kress, W. John; Karol, Kenneth G.; Clark, W. Dennis; Hedren, Mikael; Gaut, Brandon S.; Jansen, Robert K.; Kim, Ki-Joong; Wimpee, Charles F.; Smith, James F.; Furnier, Glenn R.; Strauss, Steven H.; Xiang, Qui-Yun; Plunkett, Gregory M.; Soltis, Pamela S.; Swensen, Susan M.; Williams, Stephen E.; Gadek, Paul A.; Quinn, Christopher J.; Eguiarte, Luis E.; Golenberg, Edward; Learn, Gerald H.; Graham, Sean W.; Barrett, Spencer C. H.; Dayanandan, Selvadurai; Albert, Victor A. (1993). "Phylogenetics of Seed Plants: An Analysis of Nucleotide Sequences from the Plastid Gene rbcL" (PDF). Annals of the Missouri Botanical Garden. 80 (3): 528. doi:10.2307/2399846. hdl:1969.1/179875. JSTOR 2399846.
- Källersjö, M.; Farris, J.S.; Chase, M.W.; Bremer, B.; Fay, M.F.; Humphries, C.J.; Petersen, G.; Seberg, O.; Bremer, K. (1998). "Simultaneous parsimony jacknife analysis of 2538rbcL DNA sequences reveals support for major clades of green plants, land plants, and flowering plants" (PDF). Pl. Syst. Evol. 213 (3–4): 259–287. doi:10.1007/BF00985205. S2CID 30318825.
- Pires, J.C.; Maureira, I.J.; Givnish, T.J.; Sytsma, K.J.; Seberg, O.; Petersen, G.; Davis, J.I.; Stevenson, D.W.; Rudall, P.J.; Fay, M.F.; Chase, M.W. (2006). "Phylogeny, genome size, and chromosome evolution of Asparagales". Aliso: A Journal of Systematic and Floristic Botany. 22: 278–304.
- Rudall, P.; Furness, C.A.; Chase, M.W.; Fay, M.F. (1997). "Microsporogenesis and pollen sulcus type in Asparagales (Lilianae)". Can. J. Bot. 75 (3): 408–430. doi:10.1139/b97-044. ISSN 0008-4026. INIST 10769694.

==== Phylogenetics: Angiosperms and monocots ====
- Bremer, K. (4 April 2000). "Early Cretaceous lineages of monocot flowering plants". Proceedings of the National Academy of Sciences. 97 (9): 4707–4711. Bibcode:2000PNAS...97.4707B. doi:10.1073/pnas.080421597. PMC 18297. PMID 10759567.
- Davis, J.I.; Stevenson, D.W.; Petersen, G.; Seberg, O.; Campbell, L.M.; Freudenstein, J.V.; Goldman, D.H.; Hardy, C.R.; Michelangeli, F.A.; Simmons, M.P.; Specht, C.D.; Vergara-Silva, F.; Gandolfo, M. (July–September 2004). "A phylogeny of the monocots, as inferred from rbcL and atpA sequence variation, and a comparison of methods for calculating jacknife and bootstrap values". Syst. Bot. 29 (3): 467–510. doi:10.1600/0363644041744365. S2CID 13108898.
- Chase, M. W.; Fay, M. F.; Devey, D. S.; Maurin, O; Rønsted, N; Davies, T. J; Pillon, Y; Petersen, G; Seberg, O; Tamura, M. N.; Asmussen, C. B.; Hilu, K; Borsch, T; Davis, J. I; Stevenson, D. W.; Pires, J. C.; Givnish, T. J.; Sytsma, K. J.; McPherson, M. A.; Graham, S. W.; Rai, H. S. "Multigene analyses of monocot relationships: a summary" (PDF). Aliso: 63–75. ISSN 0065-6275. In Columbus et al. (2006)
- Givnish, Thomas J.; Pires, J.Chris; Graham, Sean W.; McPherson, Marc A.; Prince, Linda M.; Patterson, Thomas B.; Rai, Hardeep S.; Roalson, Eric H.; Evans, Timothy M.; Hahn, William J; Millam, Kendra C.; Meerow, Alan W; Molvray, Mia; Kores, Paul J.; O'Brien, Heath E.; Hall, Jocelyn C.; Kress, W. John; Sytsma, Kenneth J. (2005). "Repeated evolution of net venation and fleshy fruits among monocots in shaded habitats confirms a priori predictions: evidence from an ndhF phylogeny". Proceedings of the Royal Society B: Biological Sciences. 272 (1571): 1481–1490. doi:10.1098/rspb.2005.3067. PMC 1559828. PMID 16011923.
- Graham, S.W.; Zgurski, J.M.; McPherson, M.A.; Cherniawsky, D.M.; Saarela, J.M.; Horne, E.S.C.; Smith, S.Y.; Wong, W.A.; O'Brien, H.E.; Biron, V.L.; Pires, J.C.; Olmstead, R.G.; Chase, M.W.; Rai, H.S. Robust inference of monocot deep phylogeny using an expanded multigene plastid data set (PDF). pp. 3–21. Archived from the original (PDF) on 24 Aug 2007. In Columbus et al. (2006)
- Hilu, K.; Borsch, T.; Muller, K.; Soltis, D.E.; Soltis, P.S.; Savolainen, V.; Chase, M.W.; Powell, M.P.; Alice, L.A.; Evans, R.; Sauquet, H.; Neinhuis, C.; Slotta, T.A.B.; Rohwer, J.G.; Campbell, C.S.; Chatrou, L.W. (December 2003). "Angiosperm phylogeny based on <011> matK sequence information". American Journal of Botany. 90 (12): 1758–1766. doi:10.3732/ajb.90.12.1758. PMID 21653353.
- Janssen, Thomas; Bremer, Kare (December 2004). "The age of major monocot groups inferred from 800+ rbcL sequences". Botanical Journal of the Linnean Society. 146 (4): 385–398. doi:10.1111/j.1095-8339.2004.00345.x.
- Meerow, A.W. (February 2002). "The new phylogeny of the Lilioid Monocotyledons". Acta Horticulturae (570): 31–45. doi:10.17660/ActaHortic.2002.570.2. Archived from the original on 2016-01-27.
- Soltis, D. E.; Soltis, P.S.; Chase, M.W.; Mort, M.E.; Albach, D.C.; Zanis, M.; Savolainen, V.; Hahn, W.H.; Hoot, S.B.; Fay, M.F.; Axtell, M.; Swensen, S.M.; Prince, L.M.; Kress, W.J.; Nixon, K.C.; Farris, J.S. (2000). "Angiosperm phylogeny inferred from 18S rDNA, rbcL, and atpB sequences". Bot. J. Linn. Soc. 133 (4): 381–461. doi:10.1006/bojl.2000.0380.
- Wikström, N.; Savolainen, V.; Chase, M. W. (7 November 2001). "Evolution of the angiosperms: calibrating the family tree". Proc Biol Sci. 268 (1482): 2211–2220. doi:10.1098/rspb.2001.1782. PMC 1088868. PMID 11674868.

==== Phylogenetics: Liliales ====
- Christenhusz, Maarten J.M.; Govaerts, Rafaël; David, John C.; Hall, Tony; Borland, Katherine; Roberts, Penelope S.; Tuomisto, Anne; Buerki, Sven; Chase, Mark W.; Fay, Michael F. (2013). "Tiptoe through the tulips – cultural history, molecular phylogenetics and classification of Tulipa (Liliaceae)". Botanical Journal of the Linnean Society. 172 (3): 280–328. doi:10.1111/boj.12061.
- Clennett, John C. B.; Chase, Mark W.; Forest, Félix; Maurin, Olivier; Wilkin, Paul (December 2012). "Phylogenetic systematics of Erythronium (Liliaceae): morphological and molecular analyses". Botanical Journal of the Linnean Society. 170 (4): 504–528. doi:10.1111/j.1095-8339.2012.01302.x.
- Gao, Yun-Dong; Zhou, Song-Dong; He, Xing-Jin; Wan, Juan (11 May 2011). "Chromosome diversity and evolution in tribe Lilieae (Liliaceae) with emphasis on Chinese species". Journal of Plant Research. 125 (1): 55–69. doi:10.1007/s10265-011-0422-1. PMID 21559881. S2CID 10185112.
- Gao, Yun-Dong; Hohenegger, Markus; Harris, AJ; Zhou, Song-Dong; He, Xing-Jin; Wan, Juan (2012). "A new species in the genus Nomocharis Franchet (Liliaceae): evidence that brings the genus Nomocharis into Lilium". Plant Systematics and Evolution. 298 (1): 69–85. Bibcode:2012PSyEv.298...69G. doi:10.1007/s00606-011-0524-1. ISSN 0378-2697. S2CID 16912824.
- Hayashi, K.; Kawano, S. (2000). "Molecular systematics of Lilium and allied genera (Liliaceae): Phylogenetic relationships among Lilium and related genera based on the rbcL and matK gene sequence data". Plant Species Biology. 15: 73–79. doi:10.1046/j.1442-1984.2000.00025.x.
- Hayashi, Kazuhiko; Yoshida, Seiji; Utech, Frederick H.; Kawano, Shoichi (2001). "Molecular systematics in the genus Clintonia and related taxa based on rbcL and matK gene sequence data". Plant Species Biology. 16 (2): 119–137. doi:10.1046/j.1442-1984.2001.00057.x.
- Hong, S. W.-P.; Jury, S. L. (7 September 2011). "Phylogeny and divergence times inferred from rps16 sequence data analyses for Tricyrtis (Liliaceae), an endemic genus of north-east Asia". AoB Plants. 2011 plr025. doi:10.1093/aobpla/plr025. PMC 3186281. PMID 22476495.
- Kim, Jung Sung; Hong, Jeong-Ki; Chase, Mark W.; Fay, Michael F.; Kim, Joo-Hwan (May 2013). "Familial relationships of the monocot order Liliales based on a molecular phylogenetic analysis using four plastid loci: matK, rbcL, atpB and atpF-H". Botanical Journal of the Linnean Society. 172 (1): 5–21. doi:10.1111/boj.12039.
- Kim, Jung Sung; Kim, Joo-Hwan; Robinson-Rechavi, Marc (14 June 2013). "Comparative Genome Analysis and Phylogenetic Relationship of Order Liliales Insight from the Complete Plastid Genome Sequences of Two Lilies (Lilium longiflorum and Alstroemeria aurea)". PLoS ONE. 8 (6) e68180. Bibcode:2013PLoSO...868180K. doi:10.1371/journal.pone.0068180. PMC 3688979. PMID 23950788.
- Leitch, I. J.; Beaulieu, JM; Cheung, K; Hanson, L; Lysak, MA; Fay, MF (November 2007). "Punctuated genome size evolution in Liliaceae". Journal of Evolutionary Biology. 20 (6): 2296–308. doi:10.1111/j.1420-9101.2007.01416.x. PMID 17956392. S2CID 25766640.
- McPherson, M.A.; Graham, S.W. (2001). "Inference of Asparagales phylogeny using a large chloroplast data set". Proceedings of the Botanical Society of America: 126. Abstract No. 120.
- Patterson, T. B.; Givnish, T. J. (2002). "Phylogeny, concerted convergence, and phylogenetic niche conservatism in the core Liliales: insights from rbcL and ndhF sequence data". Evolution. 56 (2): 233–252. doi:10.1111/j.0014-3820.2002.tb01334.x. PMID 11926492. S2CID 39420833.
- Peruzzi, L.; Leitch, I.J.; Caparelli, K.F. (2009). "Chromosome diversity and evolution in Liliaceae". Annals of Botany. 103 (3): 459–475. doi:10.1093/aob/mcn230. PMC 2707325. PMID 19033282.
- Peruzzi, L. (11 January 2016). "A new infrafamilial taxonomic setting for Liliaceae, with a key to genera and tribes". Plant Biosystems. 150 (6): 1341–1347. Bibcode:2016PBios.150.1341P. doi:10.1080/11263504.2015.1115435. S2CID 88042387.
- Peterson, Angela; Levichev, Igor G.; Peterson, Jens (February 2008). "Systematics of Gagea and Lloydia (Liliaceae) and infrageneric classification of Gagea based on molecular and morphological data". Molecular Phylogenetics and Evolution. 46 (2): 446–465. Bibcode:2008MolPE..46..446P. doi:10.1016/j.ympev.2007.11.016. PMID 18180173.
- Rønsted, N.; Law, S.; Thornton, H.; Fay, M. F.; Chase, M. W. (2005). "Molecular phylogenetic evidence for the monophyly of Fritillaria and Lilium (Liliaceae; Liliales) and the infrageneric classification of Fritillaria". Molecular Phylogenetics and Evolution. 35 (3): 509–527. Bibcode:2005MolPE..35..509R. doi:10.1016/j.ympev.2004.12.023. PMID 15878122.
- Shinwari, Z. K.; Terauchi, R.; Hteck, F. H.; Kawano, S. (1994). "Recognition of the New World Disporum section Prosartes (Liliaceae) based on the sequence data of the rbcL gene". Taxon. 43 (3): 353–366. doi:10.2307/1222713. JSTOR 1222713.
- Tan, Dun-Yan; Zhang, Zhen; Li, Xin-Rong; Hong De-Yuan, De-Yuan (2005). "Restoration of the genus Amana Honda (Liliaceae) based on a cladistic analysis of morphological characters". Acta Phytotaxonomica Sinica (in Chinese). 43 (3): 262–270.
- Tison, Jean-Marc; Peterson, Angela; Harpke, Dörte; Peruzzi, Lorenzo (28 November 2012). "Reticulate evolution of the critical Mediterranean Gagea sect. Didymobulbos (Liliaceae) and its taxonomic implications". Plant Systematics and Evolution. 299 (2): 413–438. doi:10.1007/s00606-012-0731-4. S2CID 24970202.
- Turktas, Mine; Metin, Özge Karakaş; Baştuğ, Berk; Ertuğrul, Fahriye; Saraç, Yasemin Izgi; Kaya, Erdal (July 2013). "Molecular phylogenetic analysis of Tulipa (Liliaceae) based on noncoding plastid and nuclear DNA sequences with an emphasis on Turkey". Botanical Journal of the Linnean Society. 172 (3): 270–279. doi:10.1111/boj.12040.
- Vinnersten, A.; Bremer, K. (September 2001). "Age and biogeography of major clades in Liliales". American Journal of Botany. 88 (9): 1695–1703. doi:10.2307/3558415. JSTOR 3558415. PMID 21669704.
- Vinnersten, Annika; Reeves, Gail (October 2003). "Phylogenetic relationships within Colchicaceae". American Journal of Botany. 90 (10): 1455–62. doi:10.3732/ajb.90.10.1455. PMID 21659097.
- Zarrei, M.; Wilkin, P.; Fay, M. F.; Ingrouille, M. J.; Zarre, S.; Chase, M. W. (17 May 2009). "Molecular systematics of Gagea and Lloydia (Liliaceae; Liliales): implications of analyses of nuclear ribosomal and plastid DNA sequences for infrageneric classification". Annals of Botany. 104 (1): 125–142. doi:10.1093/aob/mcp103. PMC 2706717. PMID 19451146.
- Zomlefer, W.B.; Williams, N.H.; Whitten, W.M.; Judd, W.S. (2001). "Generic circumscription and relationships in the tribe Melanthieae (Liliales, Melanthiaceae), with emphasis on Zigadenus: evidence from ITS and trnL-F sequence data". American Journal of Botany. 88 (9): 1657–1669. doi:10.2307/3558411. JSTOR 3558411. PMID 21669700.

==== APG ====
- APG (1998). "An ordinal classification for the families of flowering plants". Annals of the Missouri Botanical Garden. 85 (4): 531–553. doi:10.2307/2992015. JSTOR 2992015.
- APG II (2003). "An Update of the Angiosperm Phylogeny Group Classification for the orders and families of flowering plants: APG II". Botanical Journal of the Linnean Society. 141 (4): 399–436. doi:10.1046/j.1095-8339.2003.t01-1-00158.x.
- APG III (2009). "An Update of the Angiosperm Phylogeny Group classification for the orders and families of flowering plants: APG III". Botanical Journal of the Linnean Society. 161 (2): 105–121. doi:10.1111/j.1095-8339.2009.00996.x. hdl:10654/18083.
- Chase, Mark W; Reveal, James L (2009). "A phylogenetic classification of the land plants to accompany APG III" (PDF). Botanical Journal of the Linnean Society. 161 (2): 122–127. doi:10.1111/j.1095-8339.2009.01002.x.
- Haston, Elspeth; Richardson, James E.; Stevens, Peter F.; Chase, Mark W.; Harris, David J. (2009). "The Linear Angiosperm Phylogeny Group (LAPG) III: a linear sequence of the families in APG III". Botanical Journal of the Linnean Society. 161 (2): 128–131. doi:10.1111/j.1095-8339.2009.01000.x.

=== Symposia ===
- Rudall, P.J.; Cribb, P.J.; Cutler, D.F.; Humphries, C.J., eds. (1995). Monocotyledons: systematics and evolution (Proceedings of the International Symposium on Monocotyledons: Systematics and Evolution, Kew 1993). Kew: Royal Botanic Gardens. ISBN 978-0-947643-85-0. Archived from the original on 5 January 2014.
- Wilson, K. L.; Morrison, D. A., eds. (2000). Monocots: Systematics and evolution (Proceedings of the Second International Conference on the Comparative Biology of the Monocotyledons, Sydney, Australia 1998). Collingwood, Australia: CSIRO. ISBN 978-0-643-06437-9., see also excerpts in Monocots: Systematics and evolution at Google Books
- Columbus, J. T.; Friar, E. A.; Porter, J. M.; Prince, L. M.; Simpson, M. G., eds. (2006). "Symposium issue: Monocots: comparative biology and evolution (excluding Poales). Proceedings of the Third International Conference on the Comparative Biology of the Monocotyledons, 31 Mar–4 Apr 2003". Aliso. 22 (1). ISSN 0065-6275. Contents
- Anders Barfod; Jerrold I. Davis; Gitte Petersen; Ole Seberg, eds. (2010). Diversity, Phylogeny, and Evolution in the Monocotyledons (Proceedings of the Fourth International Conference on the Comparative Biology of the Monocotyledons and the Fifth International Symposium on Grass Systematics and Evolution, Copenhagen 2008). Aarhus University Press. ISBN 978-87-7934-398-6.
  - Fay, M. F. (19 August 2011). "Diversity, phylogeny, and evolution in the monocotyledons". Annals of Botany. 108 (5): vi–vii. doi:10.1093/aob/mcr213. PMC 3177686.
- "MONOCOTS V: 5th International Conference on Comparative Biology of Monocotyledons. New York July 2013". Archived from the original on 24 October 2013.

=== Websites ===
- Lobstein, Marion Blois (May 2013). "Where Have All the Lillies Gone? Long-Time Changin' in the Liliaceous Families". Prince William Wildflower Society.
- Reveal, James L. (25 November 1997). "Families Placed in Liliaceae by Cronquist". PBIO 250 Lecture Notes. Norton-Brown Herbarium, University of Maryland.
- Utech, Frederick H. (2003). "Liliaceae". Flora of North America Volume 26.
- ICN (2012). "International Code of Nomenclature for algae, fungi, and plants". Bratislava: International Association for Plant Taxonomy.
- "Lily". Oxford English Dictionary (online ed.). Oxford University Press. (Subscription or participating institution membership required.)

==== Databases ====
- "Liliaceae". eMonocot. Archived from the original on 30 October 2013.
- Stevens, P.F. (2015) [2001], Angiosperm Phylogeny Website, Missouri Botanical Garden, see also Angiosperm Phylogeny Website
- GRIN (2015). "GRIN Taxonomy for Plants". Germplasm Resources Information Network.
- ITIS (2015). "Interagency Taxonomic Information System (ITIS)". Canadian Biodiversity Information Facility.
- NCBI. "Taxonomy". National Center for Biotechnology Information.
- Watson, L.; Dallwitz, M.J. (2015). "The families of flowering plants: descriptions, illustrations, identification, and information retrieval". DELTA – DEscription Language for TAxonomy.
- "World Checklist of Selected Plant Families". Royal Botanic Gardens, Kew.
- Desmet, Peter; Brouilet, Luc (2010). "Liliaceae de Jussieu". PhytoKeys (25): 55–67. doi:10.3897/phytokeys.25.3100. PMC 3819130. PMID 24198712.
- Brands, S.J. (2015). "The Taxonomicon". Universal Taxonomic Services, Zwaag, The Netherlands.
- "Tropicos". Missouri Botanical Garden. 2015.
- "The Plant List: a working list of all known plant species. Version: 1.1". Royal Botanic Gardens, Kew and Missouri Botanical Garden. September 2013.
- IPNI (2015). "The International Plant Names Index".
