= Lloydieae =

Extinct tribe of flowering plants

The Lloydieae were a tribe of monocotyledon perennial, herbaceous mainly bulbous flowering plants in the Liliaceae (Lily) family. The tribe was generally considered monogeric, being represented by the single genus Lloydia. But since that genus has at various times and is now considered to be part of the genus Gagea, and therefore in the tribe Lilieae, it was sometimes listed with both genera. Furthermore, many authorities place Gagea into a separate tribe, Tulipeae. It has also historically been considered to be a subtribe of the Lilieae. In 2013, Kim et al. proposed splitting off Gagea from the rest of Tulipeae by resurrecting the tribe Lloydieae.

== See also ==
- Taxonomy of Liliaceae

== Bibliography ==
- Brands, S.J. (1989). "The Taxonomicon". Universal Taxonomic Services, Zwaag, The Netherlands.
- Fay, M. F.; Chase, M. W.; Ronsted, N.; Devey, D. S.; Pillon, Y.; Pires, J. C.; Petersen, G.; Seberg, O.; Davis, J. I. Phylogenetics of Liliales: summarized evidence from combined analyses of five plastid and one mitochondrial loci. pp. 559–565. In Columbus et al. (2006)
- Columbus, J. T.; Friar, E. A.; Porter, J. M.; Prince, L. M.; Simpson, M. G., eds. (2006). "Symposium issue: Monocots: comparative biology and evolution (excluding Poales). Proceedings of the Third International Conference on the Comparative Biology of the Monocotyledons, 31 Mar–4 Apr 2003". Aliso. 22 (1). ISSN 0065-6275.
- F. Buxbaum (1937), "Die Entwicklungslinien der Lilioideae. II. Die systematische Stellung der gattung Gagea", Botanisches Archiv (in German), vol. 38, pp. 305ff
- Peruzzi, L.; I. J. Leitch; K.F. Caparelli (2009). "Chromosome diversity and evolution in Liliaceae". Ann Bot. 103 (3): 459–475. doi:10.1093/aob/mcn230. PMC 2707325. PMID 19033282.
- Kim, Jung Sung; Hong, Jeong-Ki; Chase, Mark W.; Fay, Michael F.; Kim, Joo-Hwan (May 2013). "Familial relationships of the monocot order Liliales based on a molecular phylogenetic analysis using four plastid loci: matK, rbcL, atpB and atpF-H". Botanical Journal of the Linnean Society. 172 (1): 5–21. doi:10.1111/boj.12039.
- Takhtadzhi︠a︡n, Armen Leonovich (2009). Flowering Plants. Springer. ISBN 978-1402096099.
- Watson, Sereno (1879). "Revision of the North American Liliaceae: Descriptions of Some New Species of North American Plants". Proceedings of the American Academy of Arts and Sciences. XIV: 213–312. doi:10.2307/25138538. JSTOR 25138538.
