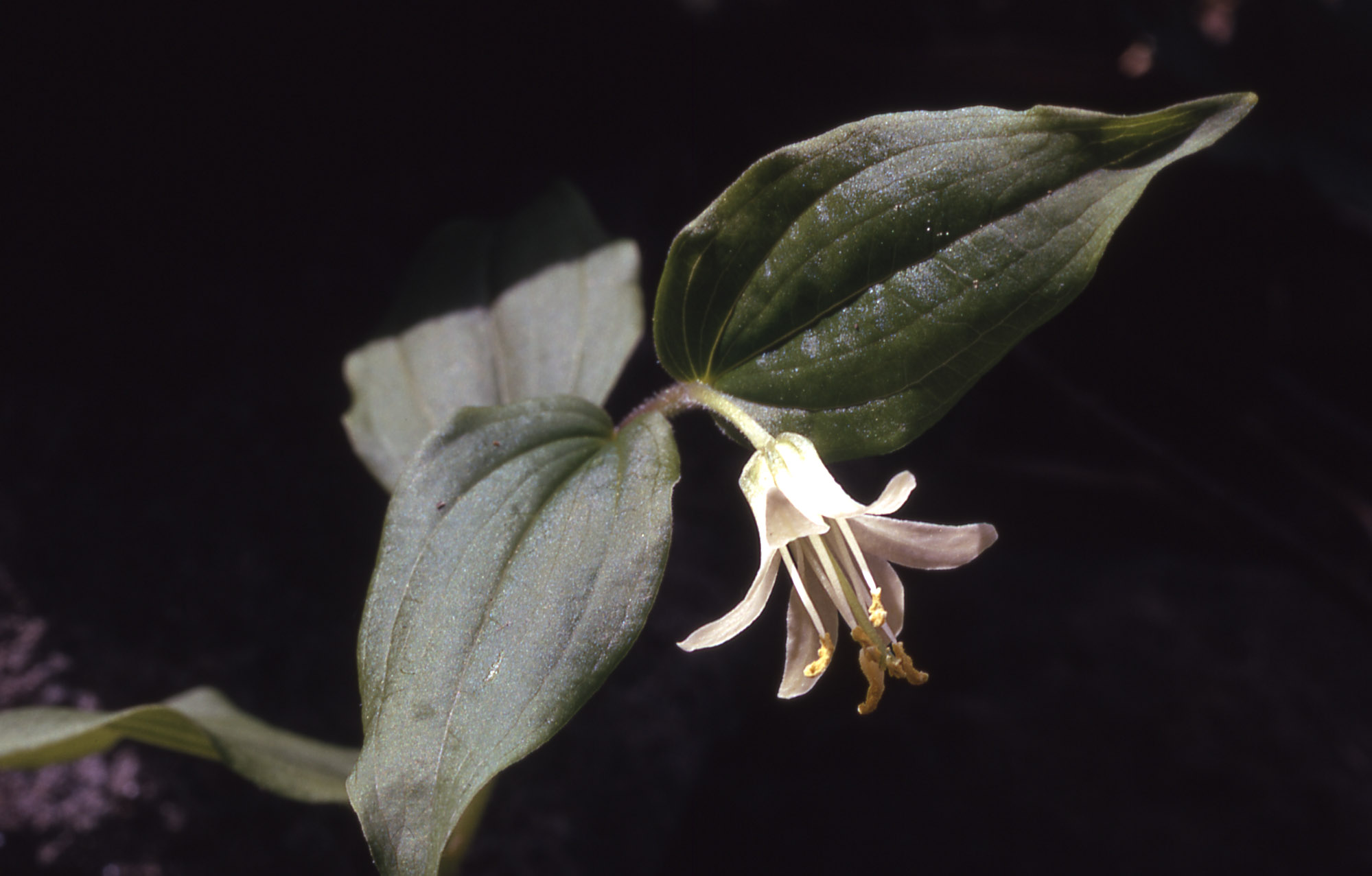
- Prosartes trachycarpa

Scientific classification
- Kingdom: Plantae
- Clade: Embryophytes
- Clade: Tracheophytes
- Clade: Spermatophytes
- Clade: Angiosperms
- Clade: Monocots
- Order: Liliales
- Family: Liliaceae
- Subfamily: Streptopoideae; Mabb. ex Reveal

Genera
- See here

= Streptopoideae =

Subfamily of flowering plants

The Streptopoideae are a subfamily of monocotyledon perennial, herbaceous, mainly bulbous shade dwelling flowering plants in the lily family, Liliaceae. The subfamily includes three genera.

== Description ==
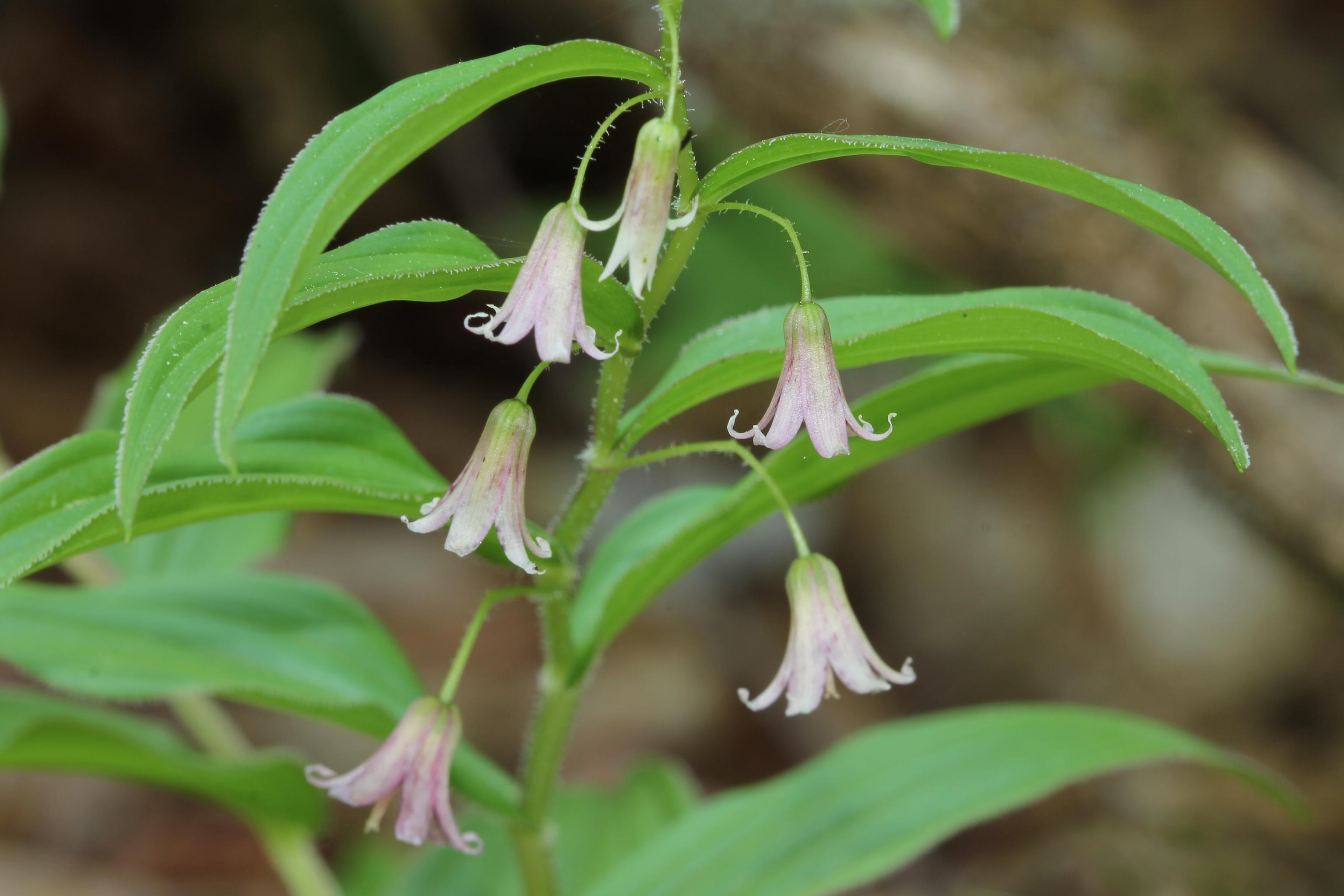
Streptopus lanceolatus

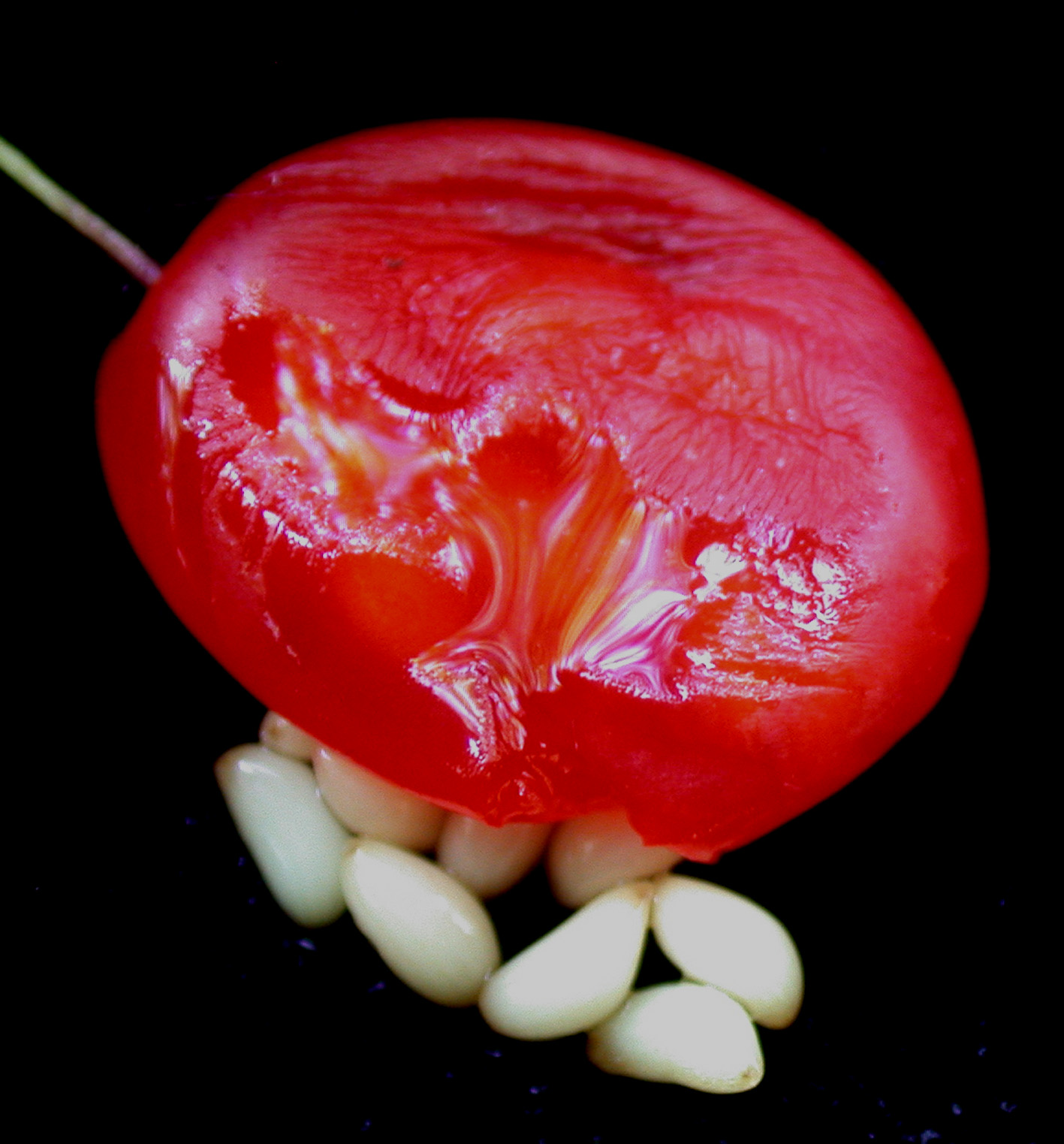
Red berry and seeds of Streptopus amplexifolius

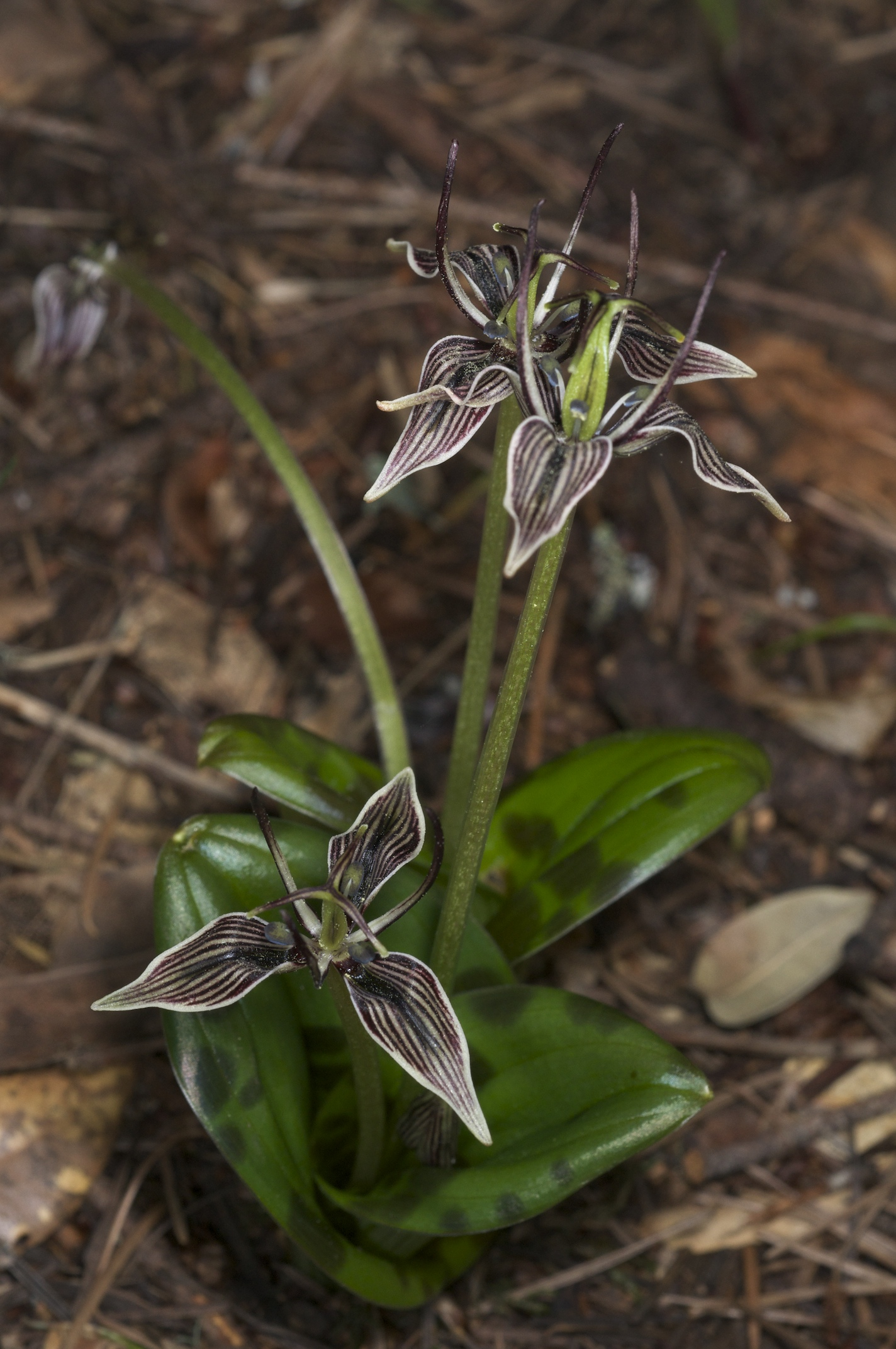
Scoliopus bigelovii

Streptopoideae are herbaceous plants with branched, leafy stems, and red to white berry fruits bearing striate seeds.

== Taxonomy ==
It was validly published by James Lauritz Reveal in 2012 based on previous work by David John Mabberley.

=== Genera ===
It has three genera:

- Prosartes D.Don
- Scoliopus Torr.
- Streptopus Michx.

=== Phylogeny ===
It is the most basal subfamily within the family Liliaceae, and therefore it is the sister group to the subfamilies Calochortoideae and Lilioideae.
