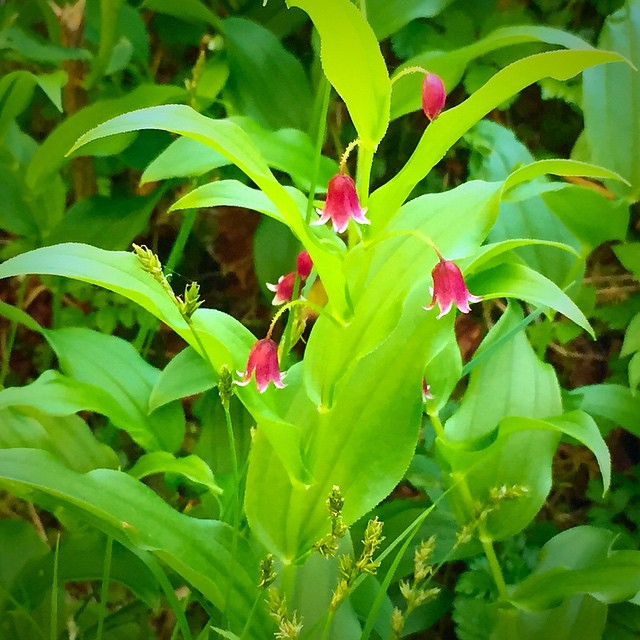
- Streptopus lanceolatus

Scientific classification
- Kingdom: Plantae
- Clade: Tracheophytes
- Clade: Angiosperms
- Clade: Monocots
- Order: Liliales
- Family: Liliaceae
- Subfamily: Streptopoideae
- Genus: Streptopus; Michx.

Synonyms
- Hexorima Raf.; Hekorima Kunth; Kruhsea Regel; Tortipes Small

= Streptopus =

Genus of flowering plants

Streptopus is a Eurasian and North American genus of flowering plants in the lily family, found primarily in colder and temperate regions. Members of the genus are often referred to as twistedstalk. It is one of the shade-loving genera of the lily family.

Streptopus spp. are perennial herbs spreading by means of underground rhizomes. They generally produce flowers only one or two at a time, these being often small and hidden beneath the leaves and white, greenish-yellow or rose in colour.

== Etymology ==
The genus name is a compound of the Greek adjective στρεπτός (streptos) "twisted" and the noun πούς (pous) "foot" in reference to the twisted or geniculate peduncle, as referenced in the English name given above.

== Species ==
- Streptopus amplexifolius - central + southern Europe, Russian Far East, Canada including Arctic territories, Greenland, United States (Alaska, Great Lakes + mountains)
- Streptopus chatterjeeanus - Sikkim
- Streptopus koreanus - Korea, China (Heilongjiang, Jilin, Liaoning)
- Streptopus lanceolatus - Canada, United States (Alaska, Great Lakes, Appalachians, Cascades)
- Streptopus obtusatus - China (Gansu, Hubei, Shaanxi, Sichuan, Yunnan)
- Streptopus ovalis - China (Liaoning), Korea
- Streptopus parasimplex - Nepal, Sikkim, Bhutan
- Streptopus parviflorus - China (Sichuan, Yunnan)
- Streptopus simplex - Tibet, Yunnan Bhutan, Myanmar, Nepal, Sikkim, northern + eastern India
- Streptopus streptopoides - Siberia, Russian Far East, Hokkaido, Canada (Alberta, British Columbia), United States (Alaska, Washington, Oregon, northern Idaho)
