= Rusby =

Rusby is a surname. Notable people with the surname include:

- Cameron Rusby (1926–2013), Royal Navy officer, Deputy Supreme Allied Commander Atlantic
- Henry Hurd Rusby (1855–1940), American botanist, pharmacist and explorer
- Kate Rusby (born 1973), English folk singer and songwriter
- Reginald H. Rusby (1896–1946), English World War I flying ace
