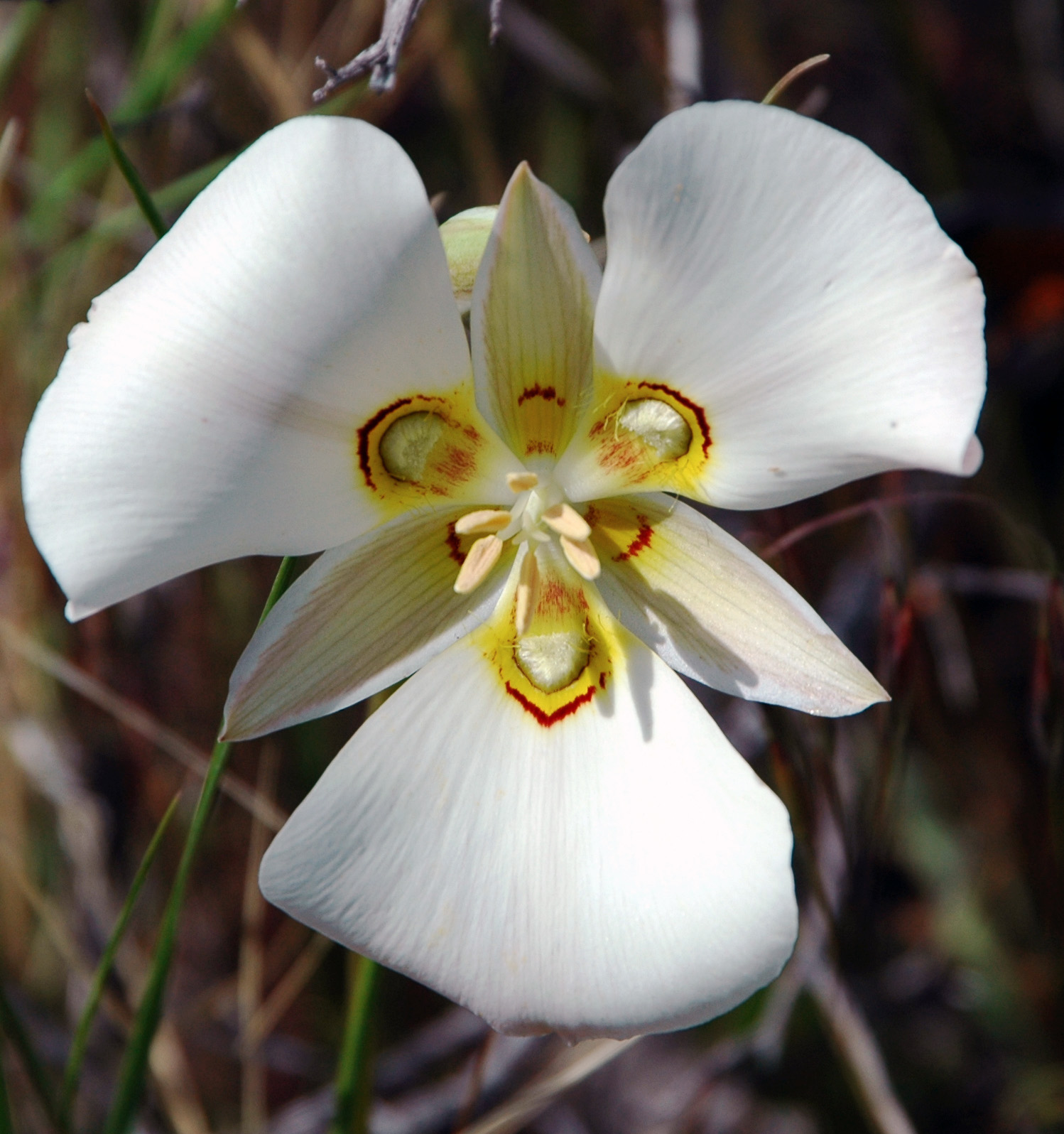
- Sego Lily; Calochortus nuttallii

Scientific classification
- Kingdom: Plantae
- Clade: Embryophytes
- Clade: Tracheophytes
- Clade: Spermatophytes
- Clade: Angiosperms
- Clade: Monocots
- Order: Liliales
- Family: Liliaceae
- Subfamily: Calochortoideae; Dumort.

Genera
- Calochortus; Tricyrtis

= Calochortoideae =

Subfamily of flowering plants

The Calochortoideae are a subfamily of monocotyledon perennial, herbaceous and mainly bulbous flowering plants in the lily family, Liliaceae. Approximately the same group of species has been recognized as a separate family, Calochortaceae, in a few systems of plant taxonomy, including the Dahlgren system. They are found predominantly in the temperate regions of the Northern Hemisphere, particularly East Asia and North America.

== Description ==
Flowers large with no or a very short style. Perianth differentiated into calyx and corolla, tepals pubescent. The embryo-sac is of the Polygonum-type. Fruit forms a septicidal capsule. Leaves have parallel venation. Chromosome number is between 6–13, and are 1.5 to 6.5 μm in length.

== Taxonomy ==
The two genera comprise about 90 species but the situation remains uncertain as to whether both should be included. Originally Calochortus and Tricyrtis were considered to be sister clades and placed together in the subfamily Calochortoideae. Further study has not confirmed this and it has been proposed that Tricyrtis be placed in a separate subfamily.

== Bibliography ==
- Kim, Jung Sung; Hong, Jeong-Ki; Chase, Mark W.; Fay, Michael F.; Kim, Joo-Hwan (May 2013). "Familial relationships of the monocot order Liliales based on a molecular phylogenetic analysis using four plastid loci: matK, rbcL, atpB and atpF-H". Botanical Journal of the Linnean Society. 172 (1): 5–21. doi:10.1111/boj.12039.
