= Nina Rønsted =

Danish botanist

- Known for: Botanical taxonomy
- Scientific career
- Fields: Botany
- Institutions: University of Copenhagen
- Author abbrev. (botany): Rønsted

Nina Rønsted (Nina Astrid Helene Rønsted) is a Danish botanist, who is Director of Science and Conservation at The National Tropical Botanical Garden, Hawaii.

== Career ==
Following completion of her PhD in Pharmaceutical Science she worked as a postdoctoral and then international fellow at the Royal Botanic Gardens, Kew (2003–2007), including spending 16 months on secondment to the Department of Plant Biology, University of Minnesota US, before returning to work at the University of Copenhagen as an assistant professor in the Department of Medicinal Chemistry (2008–2011). Since 2012 she has been at her current position as an associate professor and since 2015 full professor. In 2019 she was appointed as Director of Science and Conservation at The National Tropical Botanical Garden (NTBG) in Kalāheo, Hawaii on the island of Kauaʻi. She is known for her work on the taxonomy and phylogeny of monocotyledons.

== Selected publications ==
- Rønsted, Nina; Weiblen, G. D.; Clement, W. L.; Zerega, N. J. C.; Savolainen, V. (2008). "Reconstructing the Phylogeny of Figs (Ficus, Moraceae) to Reveal the History of the Fig Pollination Mutualism" (PDF). Symbiosis. 45 (1–3): 45–56.
- Ronsted, N; Symonds, MR; Birkholm, T; Christensen, SB; Meerow, AW; et al. (2012). "Can phylogeny predict chemical diversity and potential medicinal activity of plants? A case study of Amaryllidaceae". BMC Evol Biol. 12 (1): 182. doi:10.1186/1471-2148-12-182. PMC 3499480. PMID 22978363.
- Rønsted, Nina; Weiblen, George D.; Savolainen, V.; Cook, James M. (2008). "Phylogeny, Biogeography, and Ecology of Ficus section Malvanthera (Moraceae)" (PDF). Molecular Phylogenetics and Evolution. 48 (1): 12–22. doi:10.1016/j.ympev.2008.04.005. PMID 18490180.
- Rønsted, Nina; Weiblen, George D.; Cook, James M.; Salamin, Nicholas; Machado, Carlos A.; Savoainen, Vincent (2005). "60 million years of co-divergence in the fig-wasp symbiosis". Proceedings of the Royal Society B: Biological Sciences. 272 (1581): 2593–2599. doi:10.1098/rspb.2005.3249. PMC 1559977. PMID 16321781.
- Nina Rønsted, Dimitri Zubov, Sam Bruun-Lund, Aaron P. Davis. Snowdrops falling slowly into place: An improved phylogeny for Galanthus (Amaryllidaceae). Molecular Phylogenetics and Evolution Volume 69, Issue 1, October 2013, Pages 205–217* Bello, M. A.; Chase, M. W.; Olmstead, R. G.; Rønsted, N.; Albach, D. (2002). "The Paramo Endemic Aragoa Is the Sister Genus of Plantago (Plantaginaceae; Lamiales): Evidence from Plastid rbcL and Nuclear Ribosomal ITS Sequence Data". Kew Bulletin. 57 (3): 585–597. doi:10.2307/4110987. JSTOR 4110987.
- Rønsted, Nina; Savolainen, Vincent; Mølgaard, Per; Jäger, Anna K. (May–June 2008). "Phylogenetic selection of Narcissus species for drug discovery". Biochemical Systematics and Ecology. 36 (5–6): 417–422. doi:10.1016/j.bse.2007.12.010.* Maja Mellergaard Larsen, Anne Adsersen, Aaron P. Davis, M. Dolores Lledó, Anna K. Jäger, Nina Rønsted. Using a phylogenetic approach to selection of target plants in drug discovery of acetylcholinesterase inhibiting alkaloids in Amaryllidaceae tribe GalantheaeBiochemical Systematics and Ecology Volume 38, Issue 5, October 2010, Pages 1026–1034
- Olesen, Jens M.; Rønsted, Nina; Tolderlund, Ulrik; Cornett, Claus; Mølgaard, Per; Madsen, Jørn; Jones, Carl G. & Olsen, Carl E. (1998): Mauritian red nectar remains a mystery. Nature 393(6685): 529. doi:10.1038/31128 PDF fulltext
- Chase, M.W.; Fay, M.F.; Devey, D.S.; Maurin, O.; Rønsted, N; Davies, T.J.; Pillon, Y; Petersen, G; Seberg, O; Tamura, M.N.; Lange, Asmussen, C.B.; Hilu, K; Borsch, T; Davis, J.I.; Stevenson, D.W.; Pires, J.C.; Givnish, T.J.; Sytsma, K.J.; McPherson, M.A.; Graham, S.W. & Rai, H.S. (2006), "Multigene analyses of monocot relationships: a summary", Aliso, 22: 63–75, doi:10.5642/aliso.20062201.06
- Fay, M. F.; Chase, M. W.; Ronsted, N.; Devey, D. S.; Pillon, Y.; Pires, J. C.; Petersen, G.; Seberg, O.; Davis, J. I. Phylogenetics of Liliales: summarized evidence from combined analyses of five plastid and one mitochondrial loci (PDF). pp. 559–565. Archived from the original (PDF) on 26 April 2012. In Columbus et al. (2006)

== Bibliography ==
- Rønsted, Nina (2015). "Nina Rønsted".
- Natural History Museum of Denmark (2015). "Nina Rønsted". University of Copenhagen.
- Columbus, J. T.; Friar, E. A.; Porter, J. M.; Prince, L. M.; Simpson, M. G., eds. (2006). "Symposium issue: Monocots: comparative biology and evolution (excluding Poales). Proceedings of the Third International Conference on the Comparative Biology of the Monocotyledons, 31 Mar–4 Apr 2003". Aliso. 22 (1). ISSN 0065-6275.
