= Ixiolirion tataricum =

Scientific classification
- Kingdom: Plantae
- Clade: Embryophytes
- Clade: Tracheophytes
- Clade: Angiosperms
- Clade: Monocots
- Order: Asparagales
- Family: Ixioliriaceae
- Genus: Ixiolirion
- Species: I. tataricum

Binomial name
- Ixiolirion tataricum (Pall.) Herb.

Species of flowering plant

Ixiolirion tataricum, commonly known as the Siberian lily or the lavender mountain lily, is native to central and southwest Asia from the Sinai Peninsula to Xinjiang Province of China. Flower color ranges from light blue to dark violet.

== Gallery ==
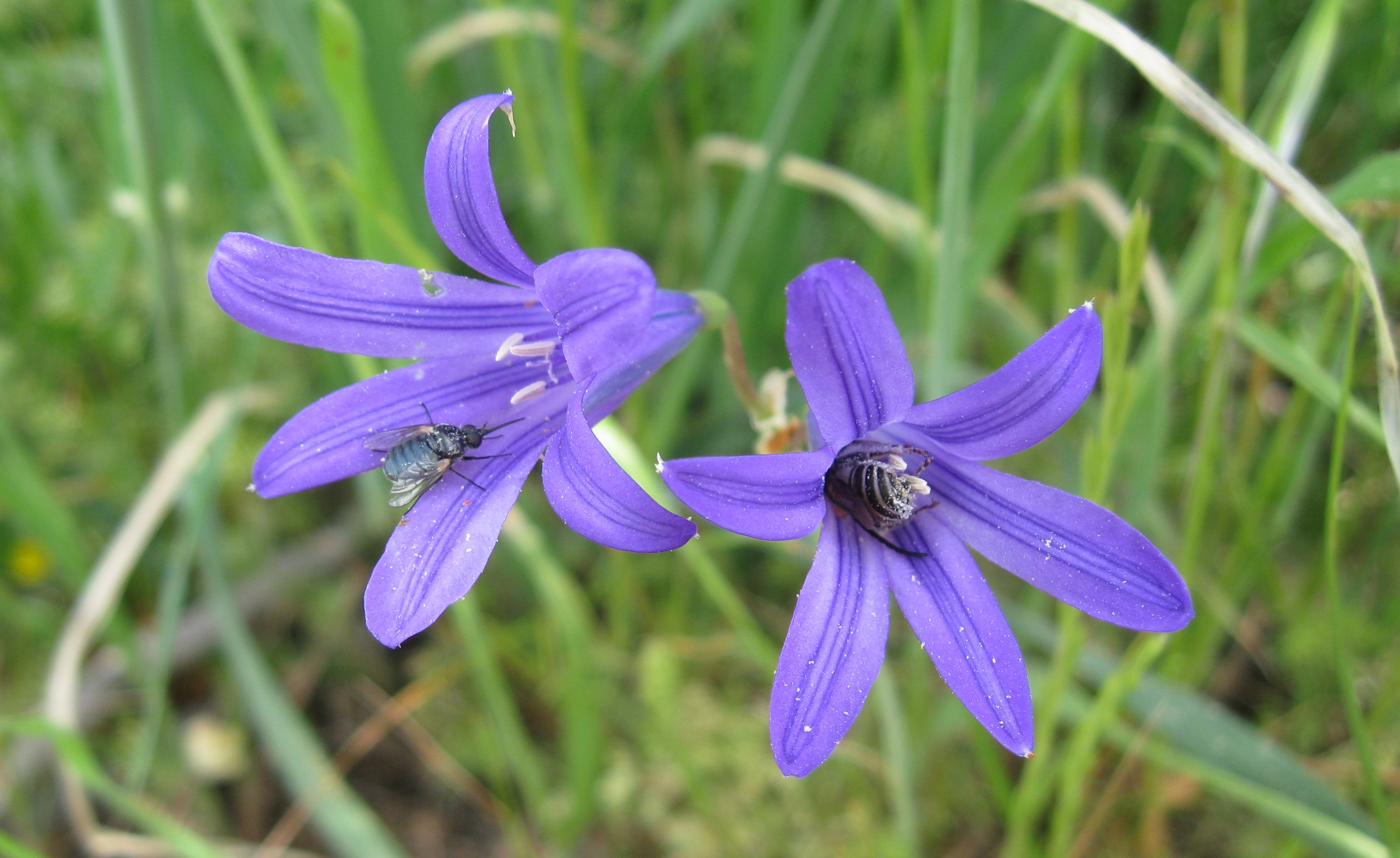
In south Hebron

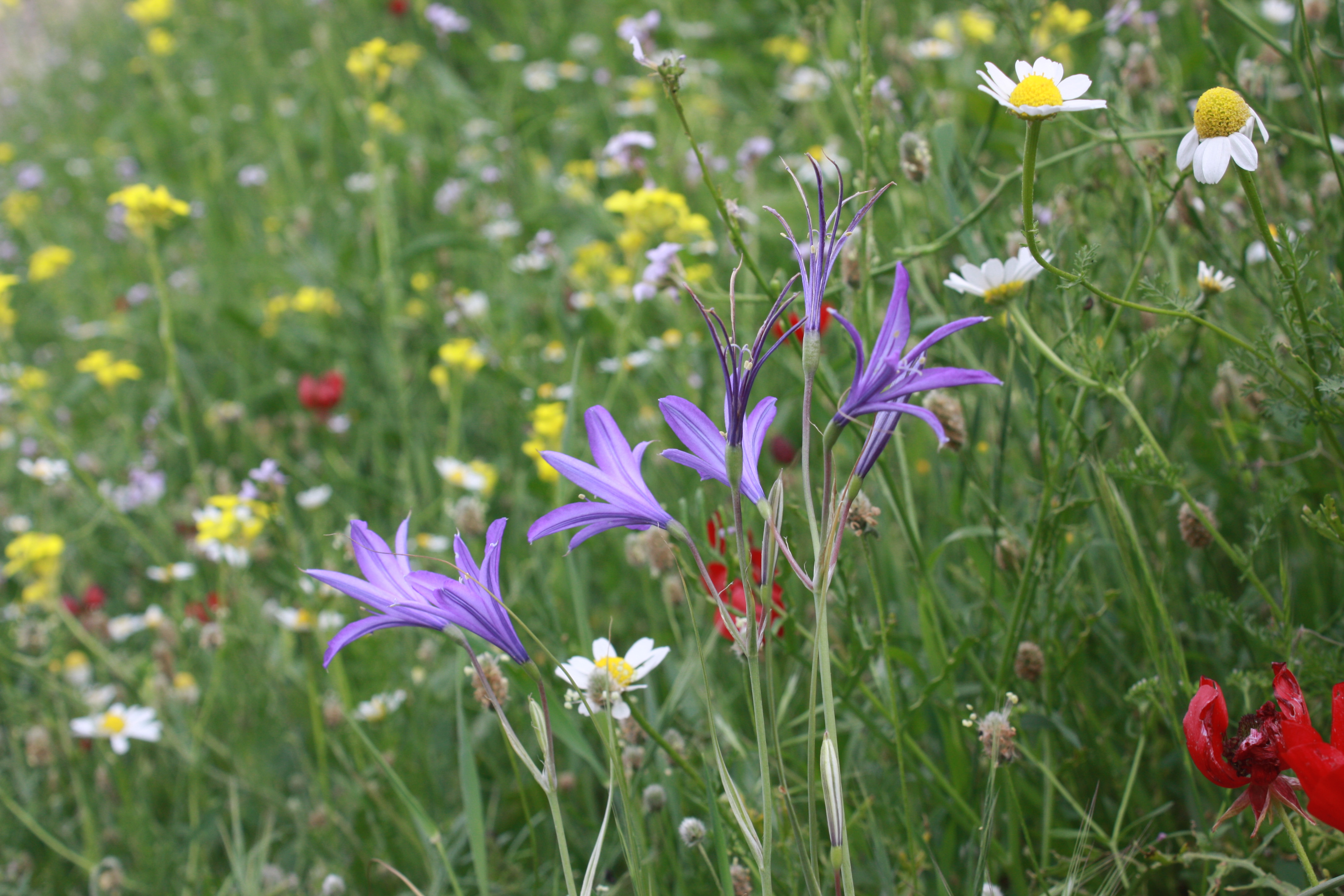
In Behbahan, Iran

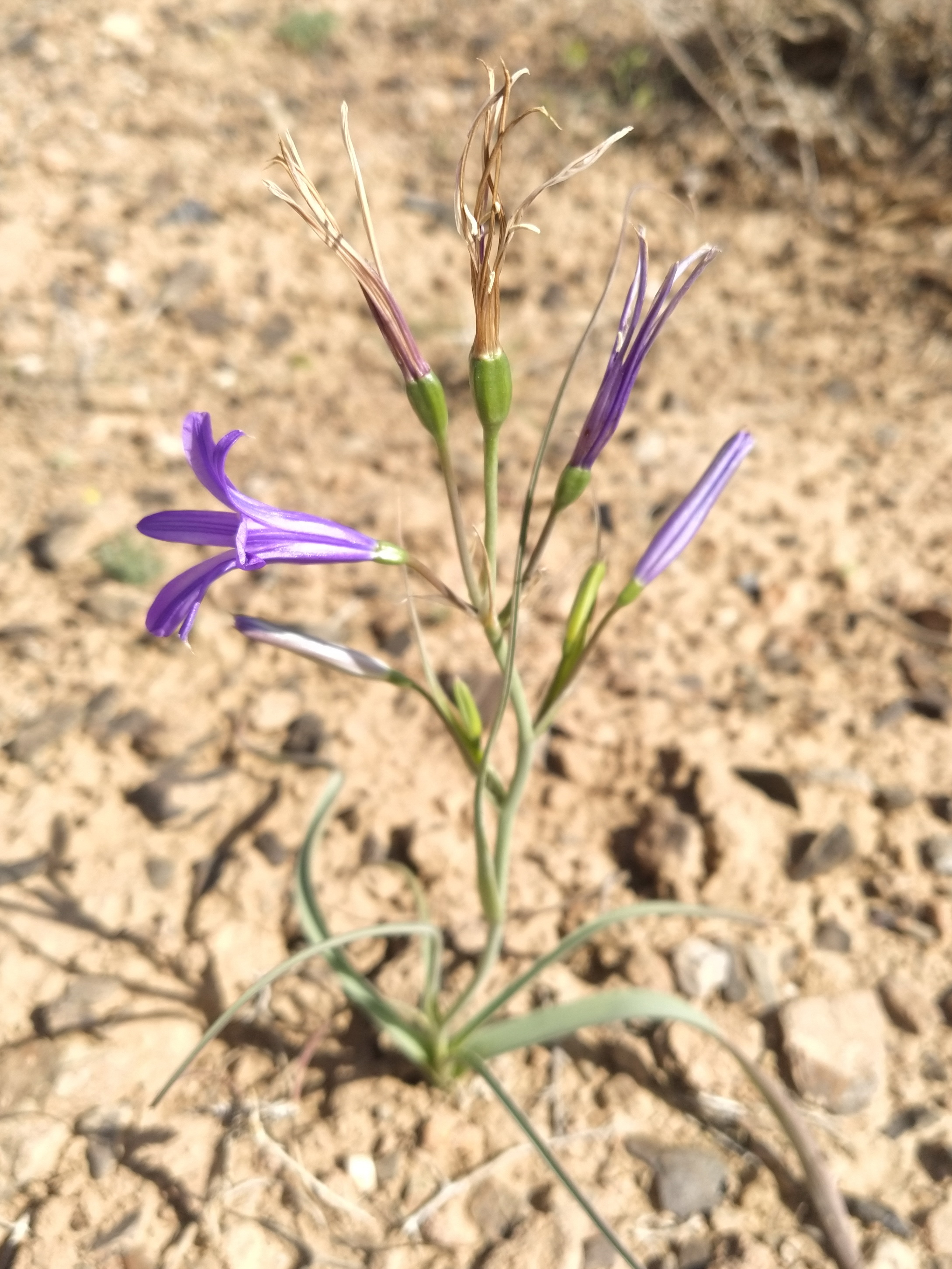
In deserts of Isfahan, Iran

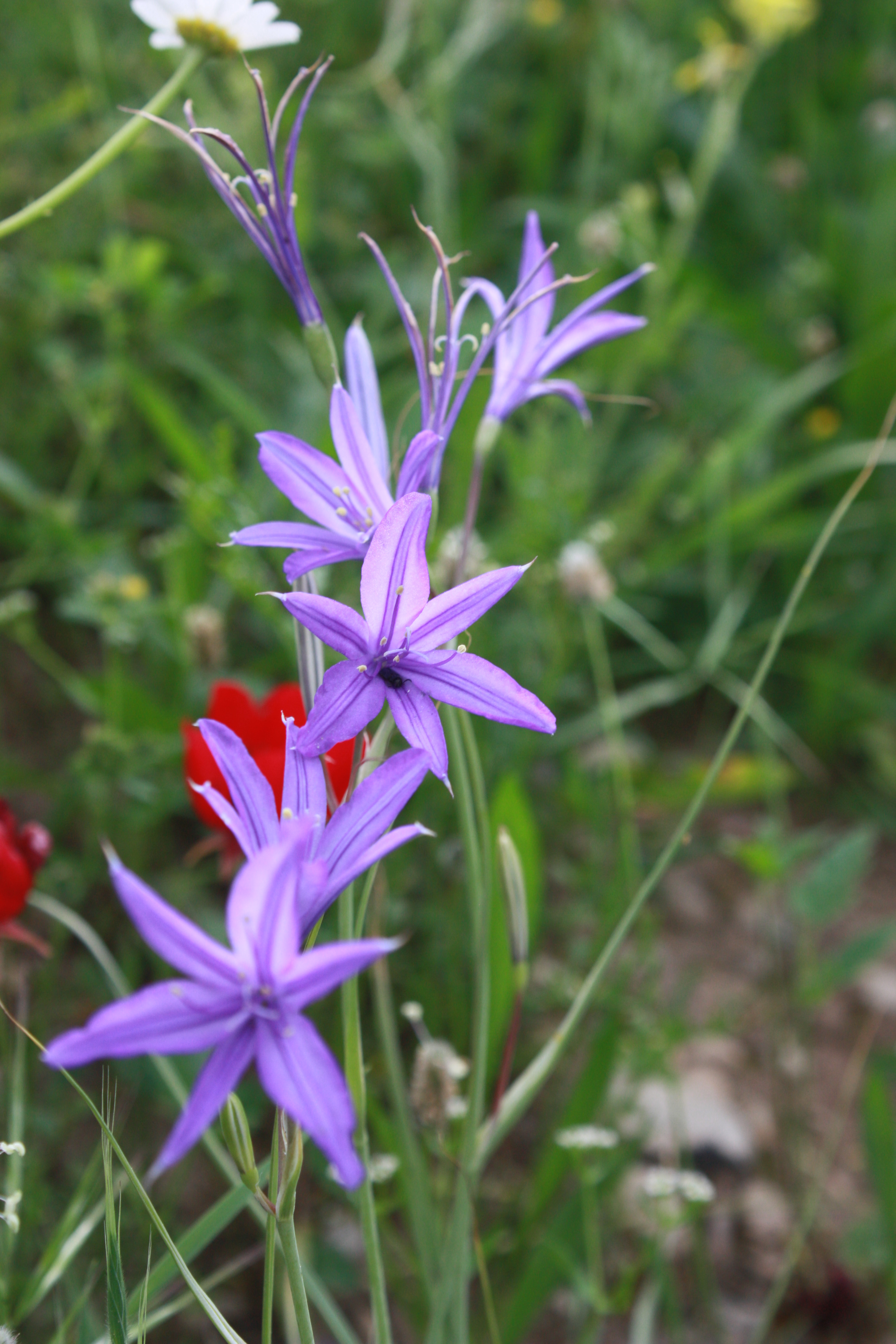
In Behbahan, Iran
