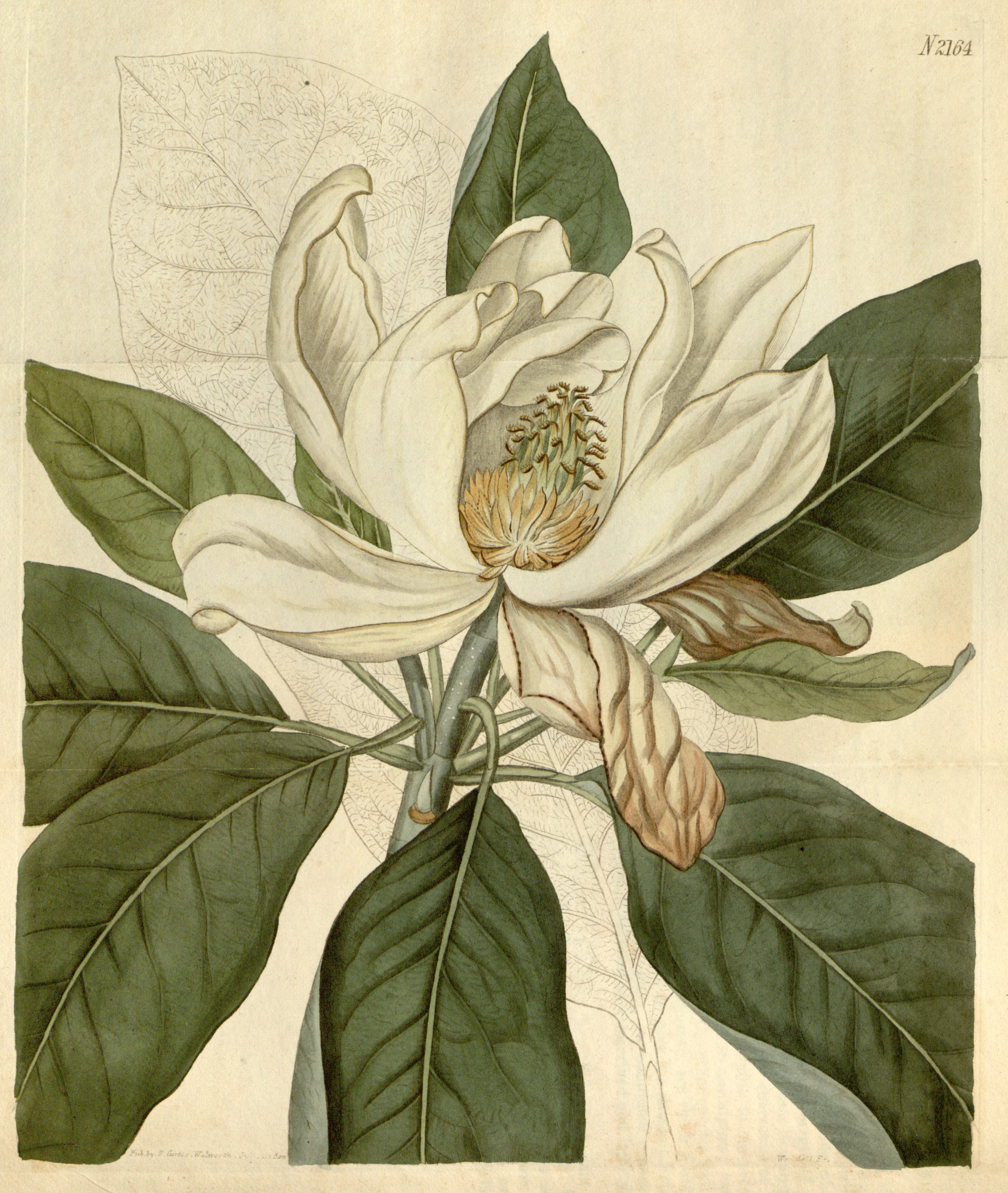

Scientific classification
- Kingdom: Plantae
- Clade: Tracheophytes
- Clade: Angiosperms
- Clade: Magnoliids
- Order: Magnoliales
- Family: Magnoliaceae
- Genus: Magnolia
- Species: M. × thompsoniana

Binomial name
- Magnolia × thompsoniana J.St.-Hil.

= Magnolia × thompsoniana =

Hybrid species of tree

Magnolia × thompsoniana is a hybrid tree in the genus Magnolia and family Magnoliaceae. It is a semideciduous tree with large white fragrant flowers.

== Hybrid origin ==
Magnolia × thompsoniana arose as a spontaneous seedling from a batch of seed taken and grown from an old tree of Magnolia virginiana in 1808 in the nursery of Archibald Thompson in Mile End in London. Nearby grew a specimen of M. tripetala. One seedling was more vigorous, with larger leaves and flowers. Thompson and later Sabine held it to be a form of the presumed parent plant and it was named M. virginiana var. major, however Jaume Saint-Hilaire ascertained its hybrid status in 1832, giving it its current name. It was the first magnolia hybrid bred, antedating the more famous Magnolia × soulangeana by twelve years.

The sprawling growth of Magnolia × thompsoniana precludes its use in smaller gardens and has likely impacted on its use in Europe. It was grown at historical Camden Park in the early 19th century.

In the 1960s, Professor Joe McDaniel of the University of Illinois crossbred hardier forms of the parent species and then bred with existing original stock of Magnolia × thompsoniana to improve the hardiness. He registered the resulting clone "Urbana" in 1969.

Magnolia × thompsoniana ‘Cairn Croft’ is a hybrid, the original plant of which was found on an estate in Westwood, Massachusetts. Its flowers are double or triple the size of M. virginiana. It has large glossy green elliptical leaves 16–21 cm (6.5–8.5 in) long by 5–8.5 cm (2.0–3.3 in) wide with wavy margins. It can reach 4.6 m high, and appears to set no seed.

Magnolia × thompsoniana ‘Olmenhof’ arose in a garden ‘Olmenhof’ in Herk de Stad, Belgium. It has larger flowers and a longer flowering season than other forms of M. thompsoniana. The elliptical to obovate leaves are 20–25 cm (8–10 in) in length, by 8–11 cm (3.1–4.3 in) wide.

== Gallery ==
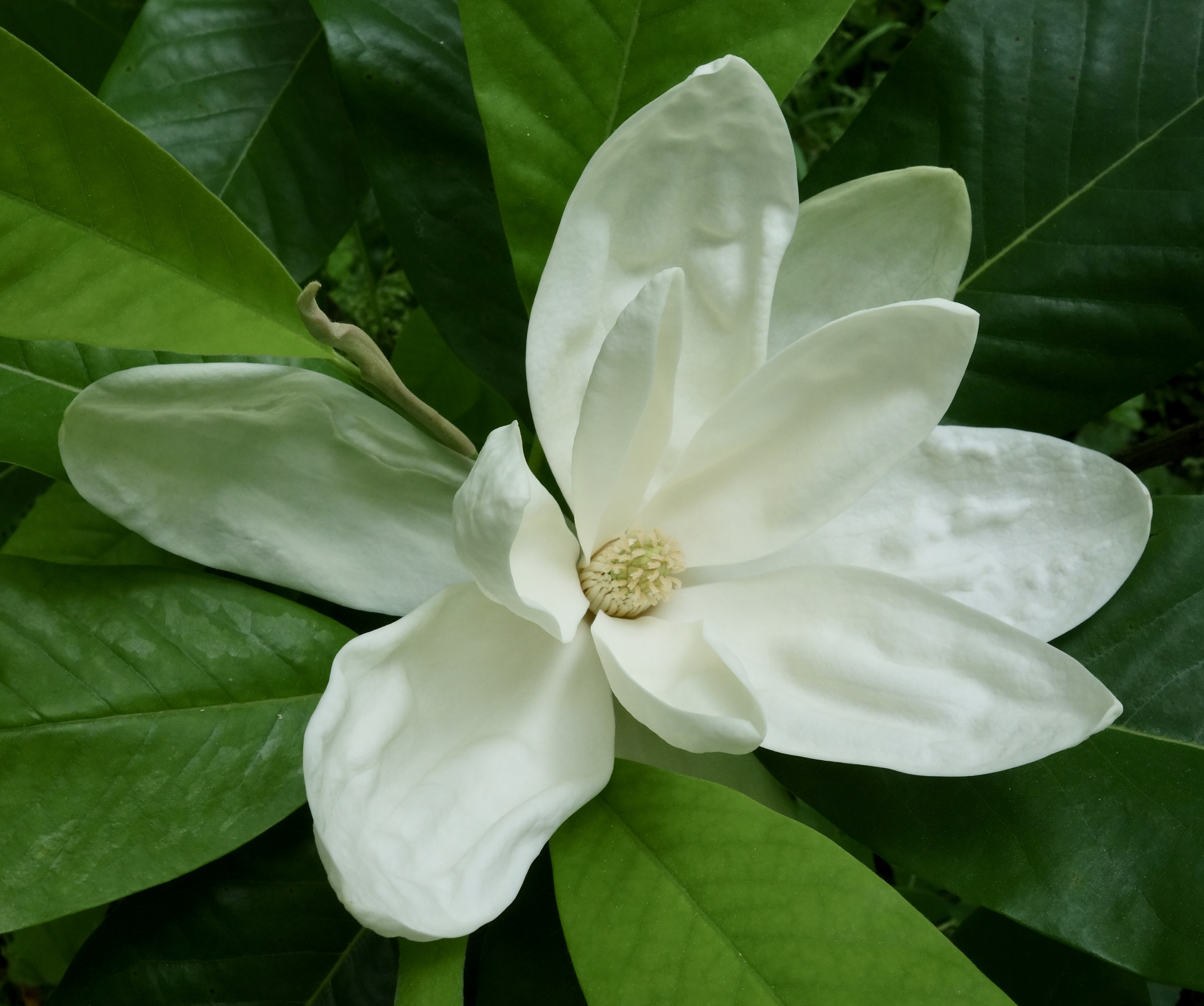
Magnolia x thompsoniana ‘Cairn Croft’, flower

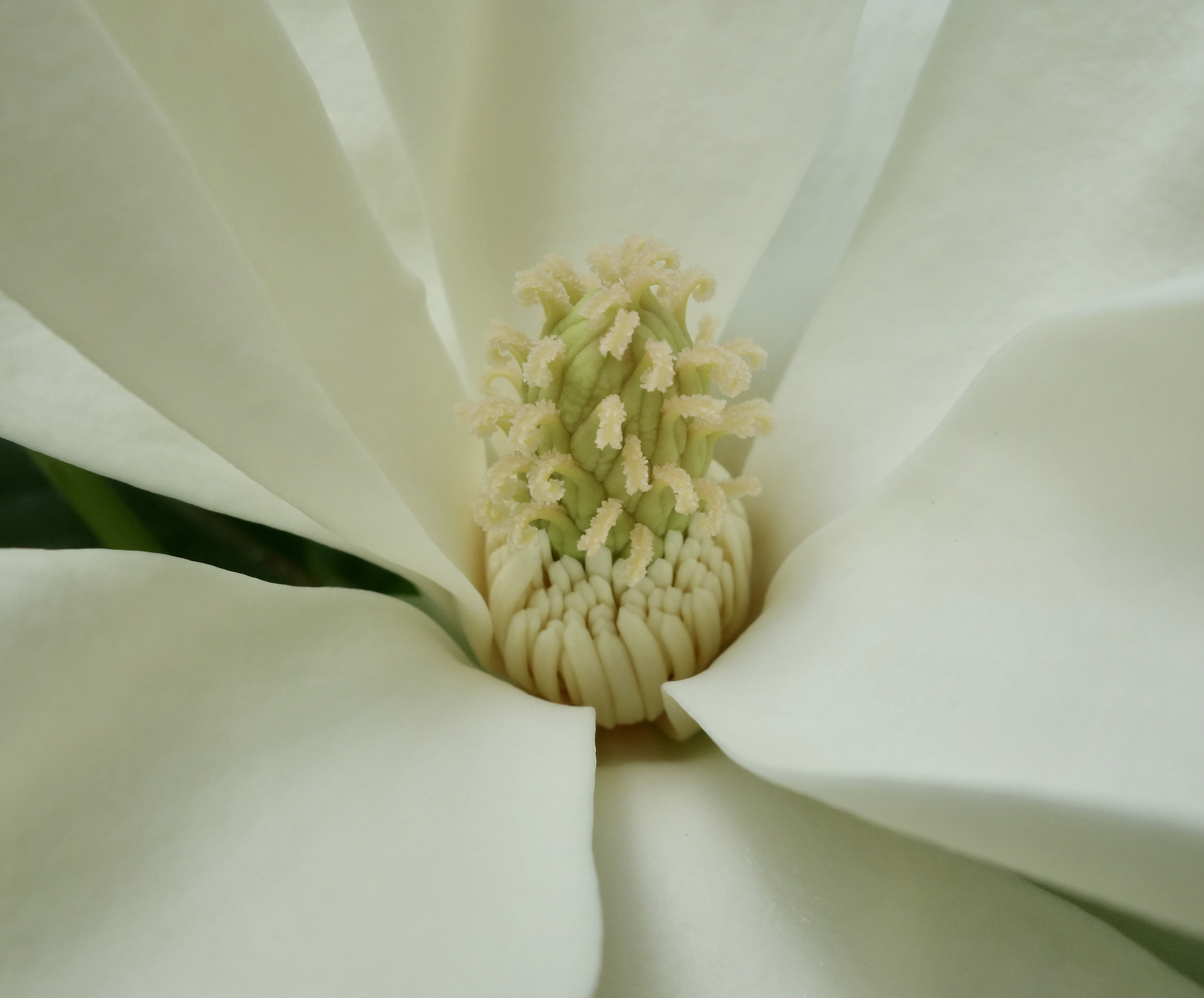
Magnolia x thompsoniana ‘Cairn Croft’ flower detail

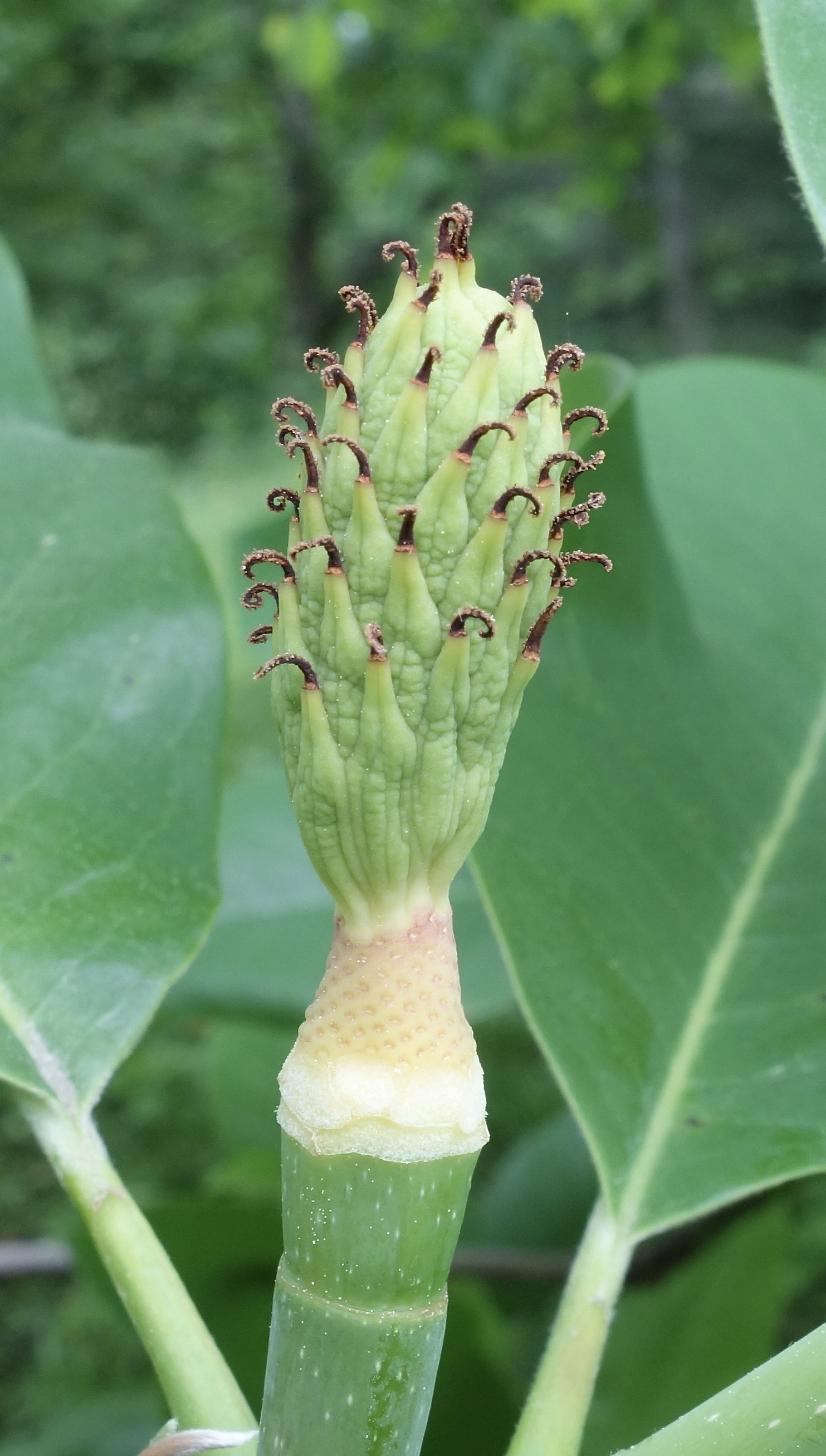
Magnolia x thompsoniana ‘Cairn Croft’, immature fruit
