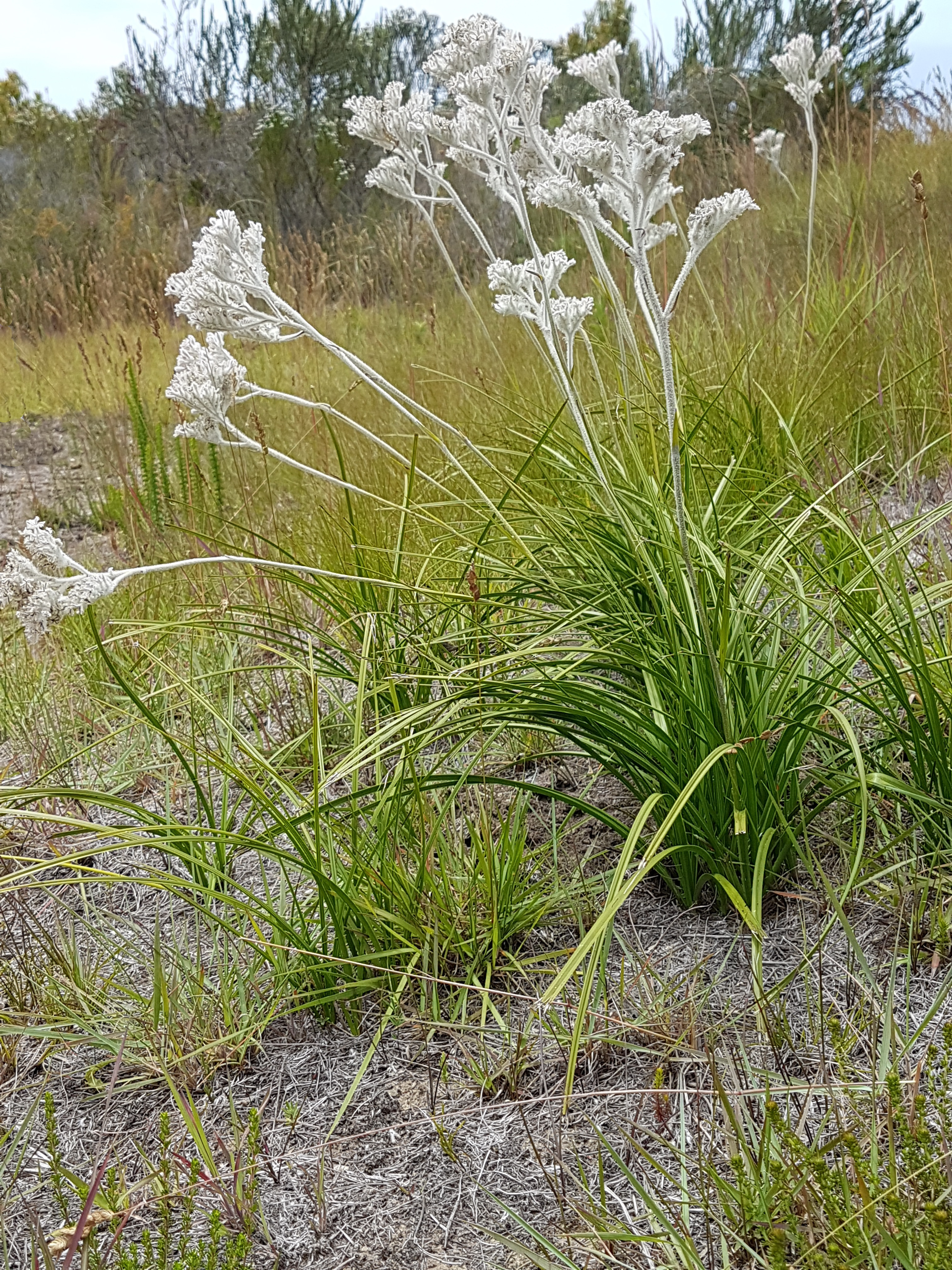

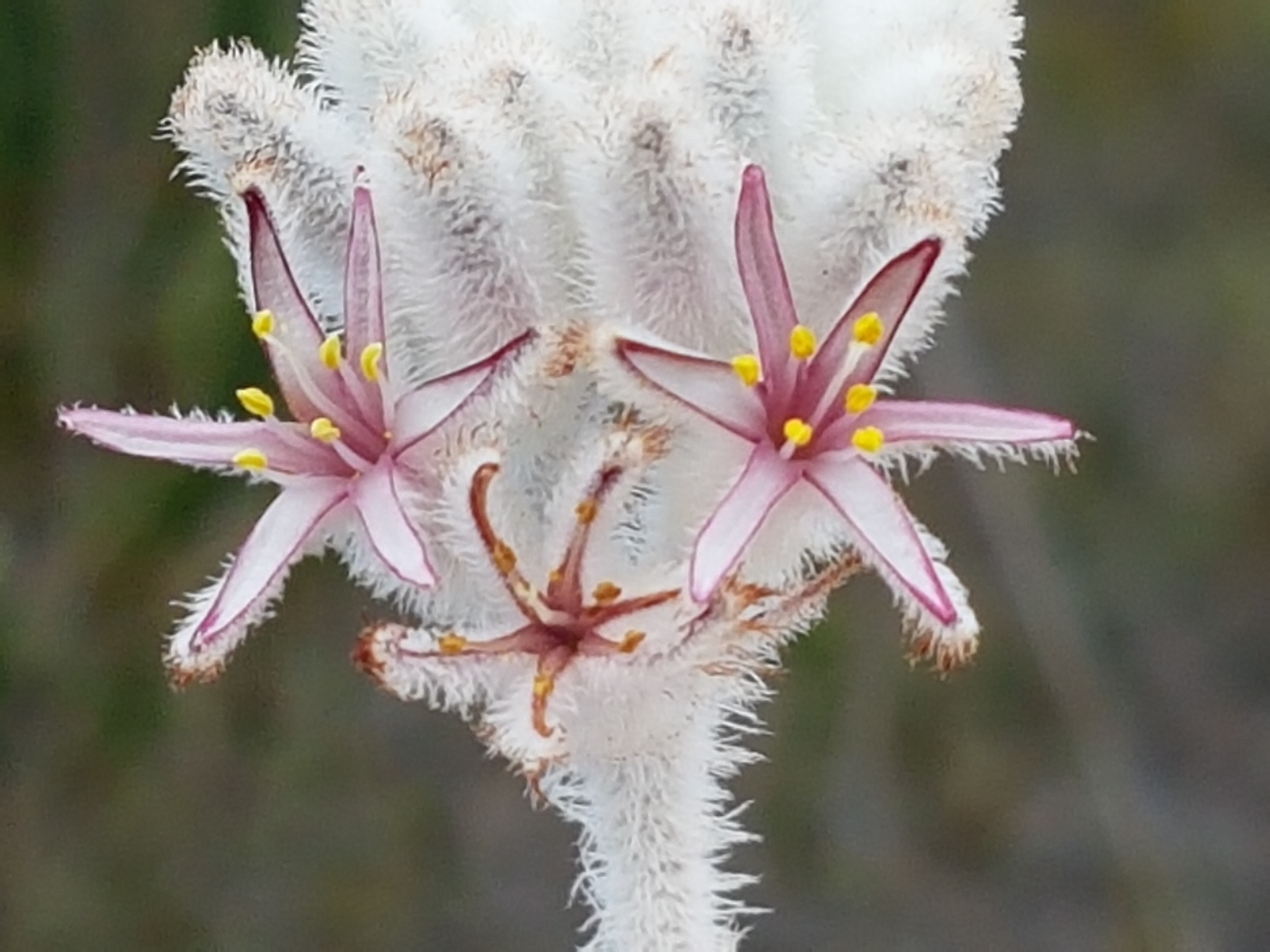

Scientific classification
- Kingdom: Plantae
- Clade: Embryophytes
- Clade: Tracheophytes
- Clade: Angiosperms
- Clade: Monocots
- Order: Asparagales
- Family: Lanariaceae; H.Huber ex. R.Dahlgren & A.E.van Wyk
- Genus: Lanaria; Aiton
- Species: L. lanata

Binomial name
- Lanaria lanata (L.) T.Durand & Schinz
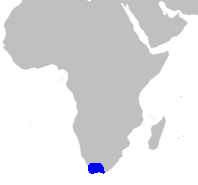
- Distribution map

Synonyms
- Genus: Argolasia Juss.; Species: Hyacinthus lanatus L.; Argolasia lanata (L.) Lam. ex Poir.; Dilatris hexandra Lam.; Lanaria plumosa Aiton; Argolasia capensis J.F.Gmel.; Argolasia plumosa (Aiton) Juss.

= Lanaria =

Genus of flowering plants

Lanaria is a monotypic genus of flowering plants containing a single species, Lanaria lanata, endemic to the southern coast of South Africa where it is associated with the fynbos belt. Lanaria lanata is commonly known as Cape edelweiss or lambtails. The genus is placed in the monotypic family Lanariaceae, a family only recently recognized by taxonomists. The APG IV system of 2016 (unchanged from the 1998, the 2003 and 2009 versions) does recognize this family.

This species occurs on clay and sandstone soils throughout its distribution range. The stiff, ribbed leaves arise from a woody rootstock and are evergreen, channelled, and finely serrate along the margins. The densely woolly, white heads enclose mauve flowers and are peculiar to the species. Flowering is profuse following fires.

== Etymology ==
Both 'lanaria' and 'lanata' are derived from 'lana', Latin for 'wool'.
