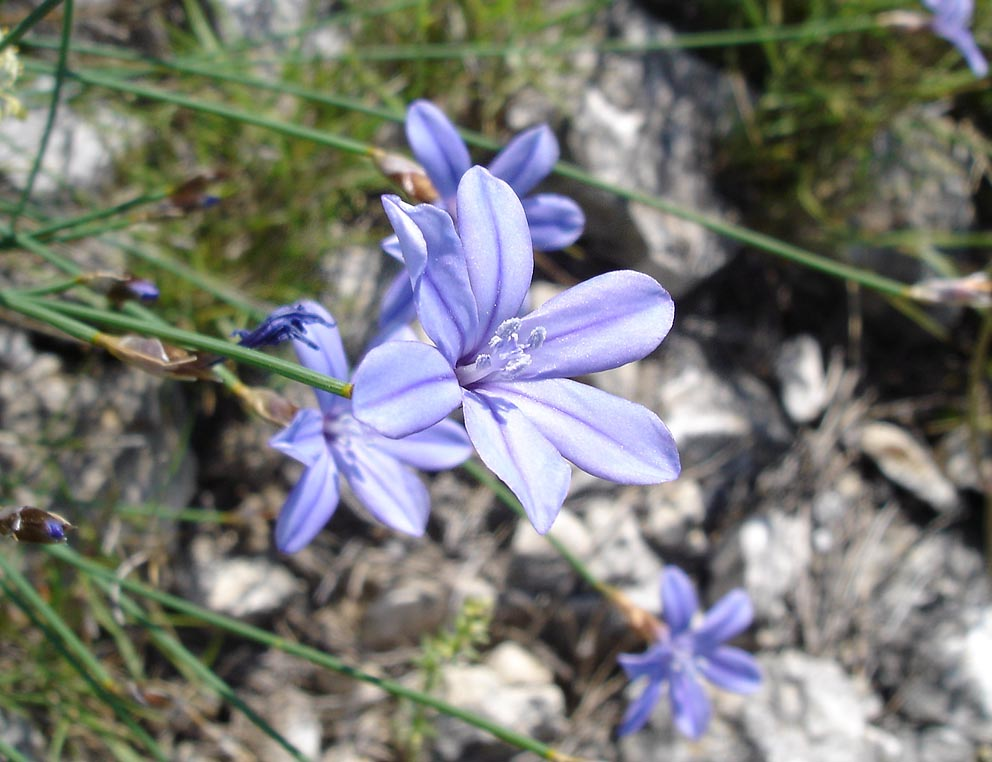
- Aphyllanthes monspeliensis

Scientific classification
- Kingdom: Plantae
- Clade: Tracheophytes
- Clade: Angiosperms
- Clade: Monocots
- Order: Asparagales
- Family: Asparagaceae
- Subfamily: Aphyllanthoideae; Lindl.
- Genus: Aphyllanthes; L.
- Species: A. monspeliensis

Binomial name
- Aphyllanthes monspeliensis L.
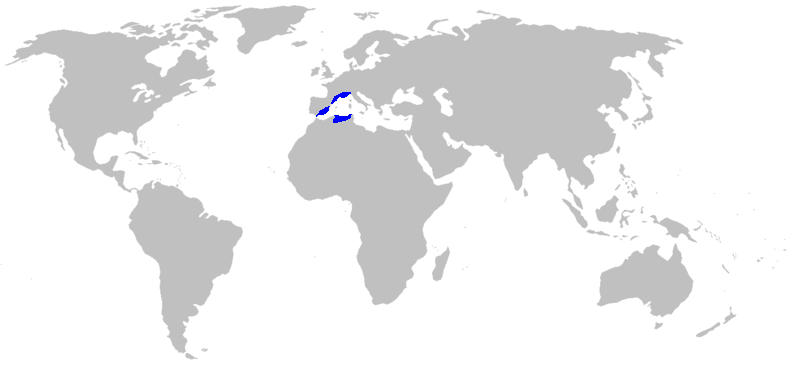
- Distribution

Synonyms
- Aphyllanthes juncea Salisb.; Aphyllanthes cantabrica Bubani

= Aphyllanthes =

Genus of flowering plants in the asparagus family

Aphyllanthes is a genus of flowering plants with only one species, Aphyllanthes monspeliensis, endemic to the western Mediterranean region. It is the only genus in the Aphyllanthoideae, a subfamily of the family Asparagaceae. Aphyllanthoideae was formerly treated as a separate family, Aphyllanthaceae.

Aphyllanthes are popular rock garden plants due to their preferred habitat. Because they originate from the Mediterranean, they are adapted to hot and dry conditions. Additionally, their large and bright flowers are an attractive trait which has resulted in the increased cultivation of this species for market.
