= Phytomelanin =

Hard organic material covering some seeds

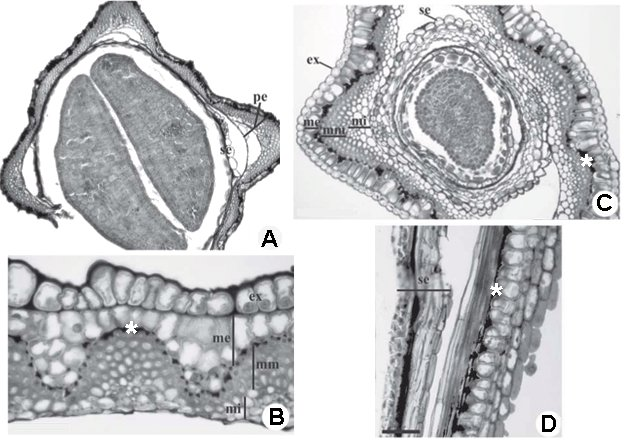
Section of fruit of Bidens, showing phytomelanin deposits (*)

Phytomelanin (phytomelan) is a black, inert, organic material that forms a crust-like covering of some seeds, commonly found in Asparagales and Asteraceae but uncommon in other taxonomic groupings. Phytomelanin is found in most families of the Asparagales (although not in Orchidaceae). It is mechanically hard and forms a resistant substance, although it is more pliable in the developing fruit, hardening later. Chemically it appears to be a polyvinyl aromatic alcohol, and is thought to be exuded from the hypodermis. It appears to provide resistance to insect predators and desiccation.

== Bibliography ==
- Pandey, Arun K.; Wilcox, Lee W.; Sack, Fred D.; Stuessy, Tod F. (May 1989). "Development of the Phytomelanin Layer in Fruits of Ageratum conyzoides (Compositae)". American Journal of Botany. 76 (5): 739–746. doi:10.2307/2444420. JSTOR 2444420.
- Pandey, AK; Dhakal, MR (25 April 2001). "Phytomelanin in Compositae" (PDF). Current Science. 80 (8): 933–940.
- Pandey, Arun K.; Stuessy, Tod F.; Mathur, Roshni R. (1 April 2014). "Phytomelanin and Systematics of the Heliantheae Alliance (Compositae)". Plant Diversity and Evolution. 131 (3): 145–165. doi:10.1127/1869-6155/2014/0131-0077.
