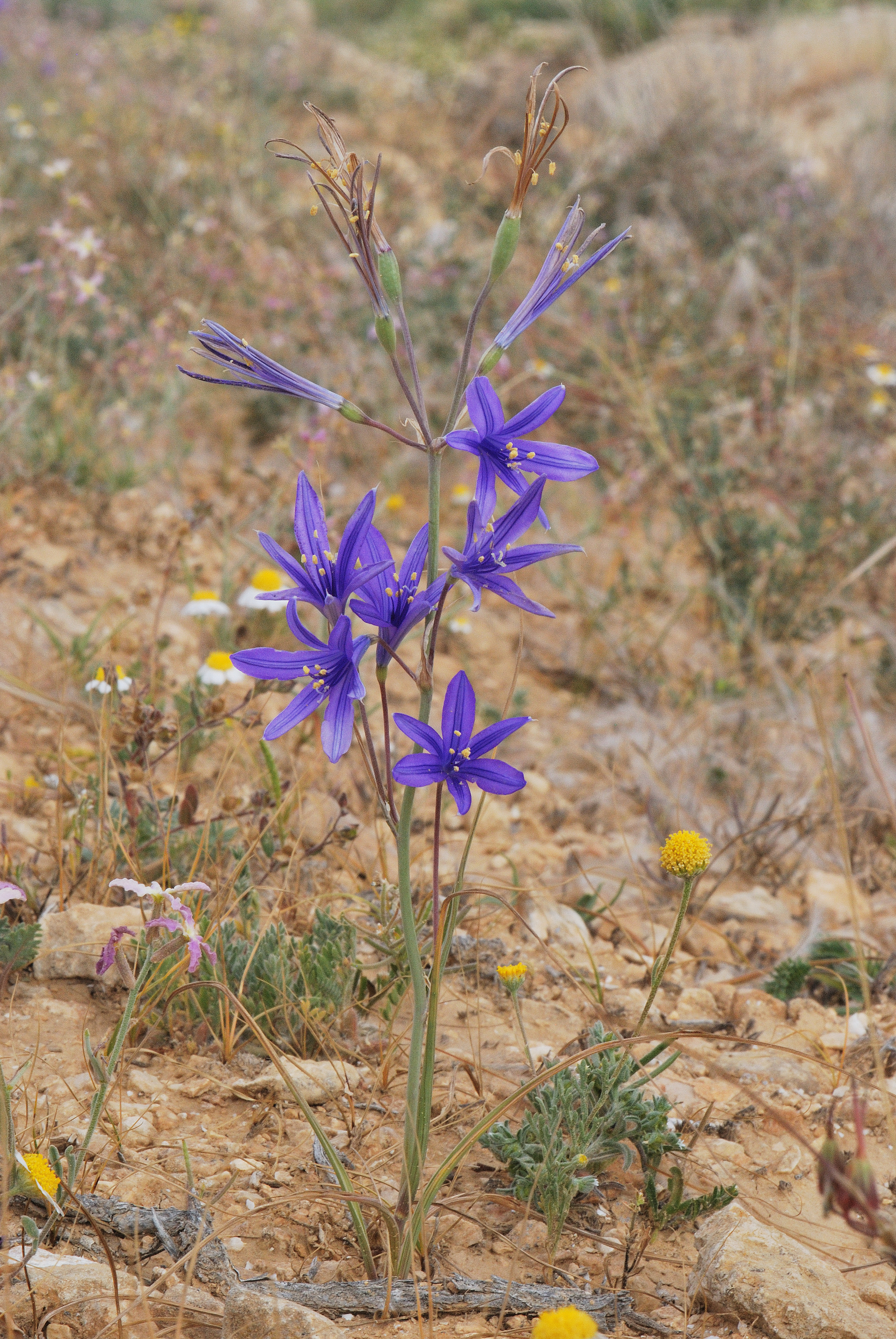
- Ixiolirion tataricum

Scientific classification
- Kingdom: Plantae
- Clade: Tracheophytes
- Clade: Angiosperms
- Clade: Monocots
- Order: Asparagales
- Family: Ixioliriaceae; Nakai
- Genus: Ixiolirion; Fisch. ex Herb.

Synonyms
- Kolpakowskia Regel

= Ixiolirion =

Genus of flowering plants

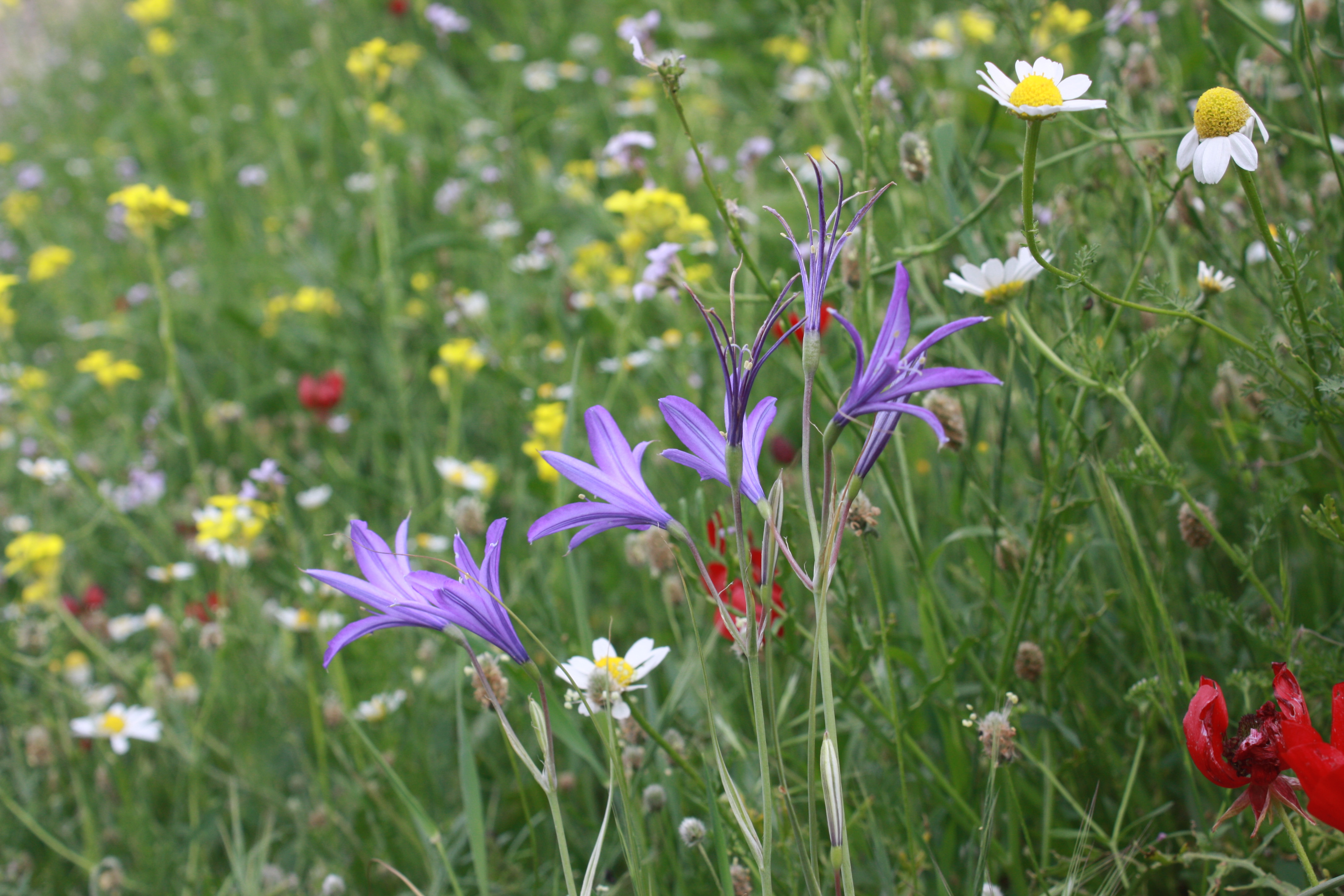
Ixiolirion Tataricum, Behbahan

Ixiolirion is a genus of flowering plants native to central and southwest Asia, first described as a genus in 1821. Recent classifications place the group in the monogeneric family Ixioliriaceae in the order Asparagales of the monocots. In earlier systems of classification, it was usually placed in the family Amaryllidaceae.

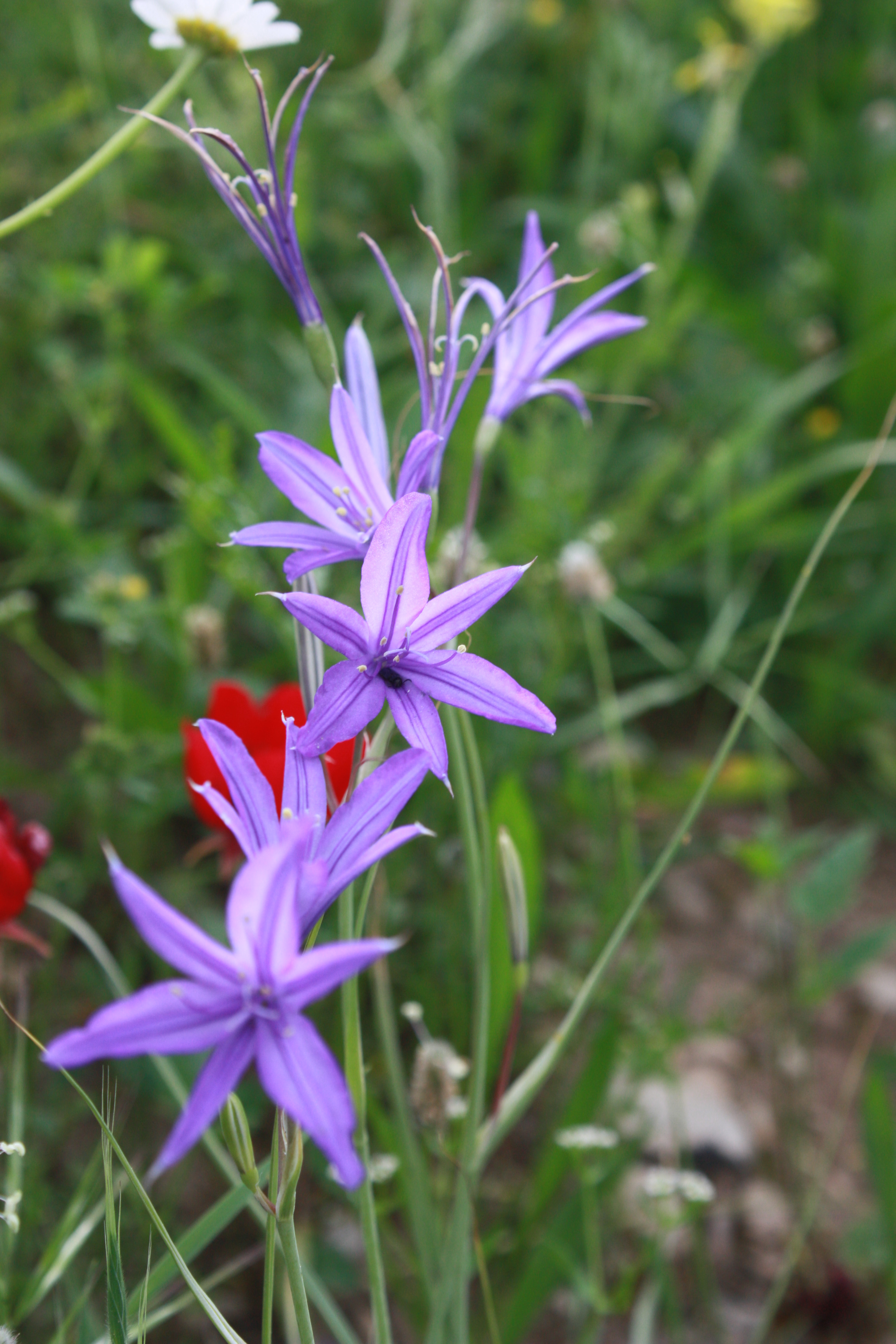
Ixiolirion Tataricum in Behbahan, Iran

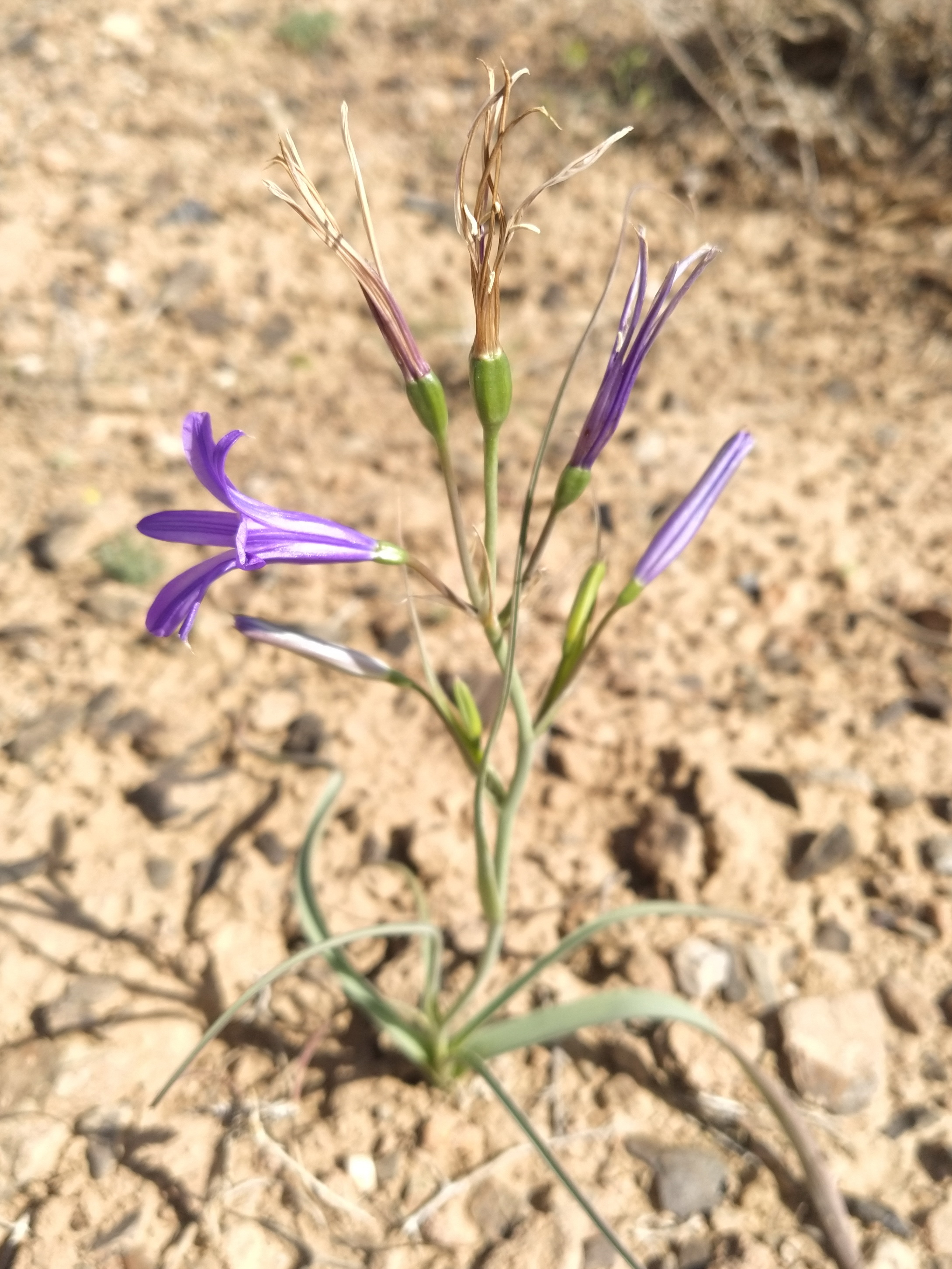
Ixiolirion Tataricum in Deserts of Central Iran

The genus name – composed of Ixio- and lirion ('lily') – means 'Ixia-like lily'.

There are four species in this genus and family

- Ixiolirion ferganicum Kovalevsk. & Vved. - Kyrgyzstan
- Ixiolirion karateginum Lipsky - Pakistan, Tajikistan
- Ixiolirion songaricum P.Yan - Xinjiang
- Ixiolirion tataricum (Pall.) Schult. & Schult.f. - Altai Krai, Kazakhstan, Kyrgyzstan, Tajikistan, Turkmenistan, Uzbekistan, Afghanistan, Pakistan, Iran, Iraq, Syria, Palestine, Sinai, Saudi Arabia, Kuwait, Oman, Persian Gulf sheikdoms, Kashmir, Xinjiang

== Gallery ==
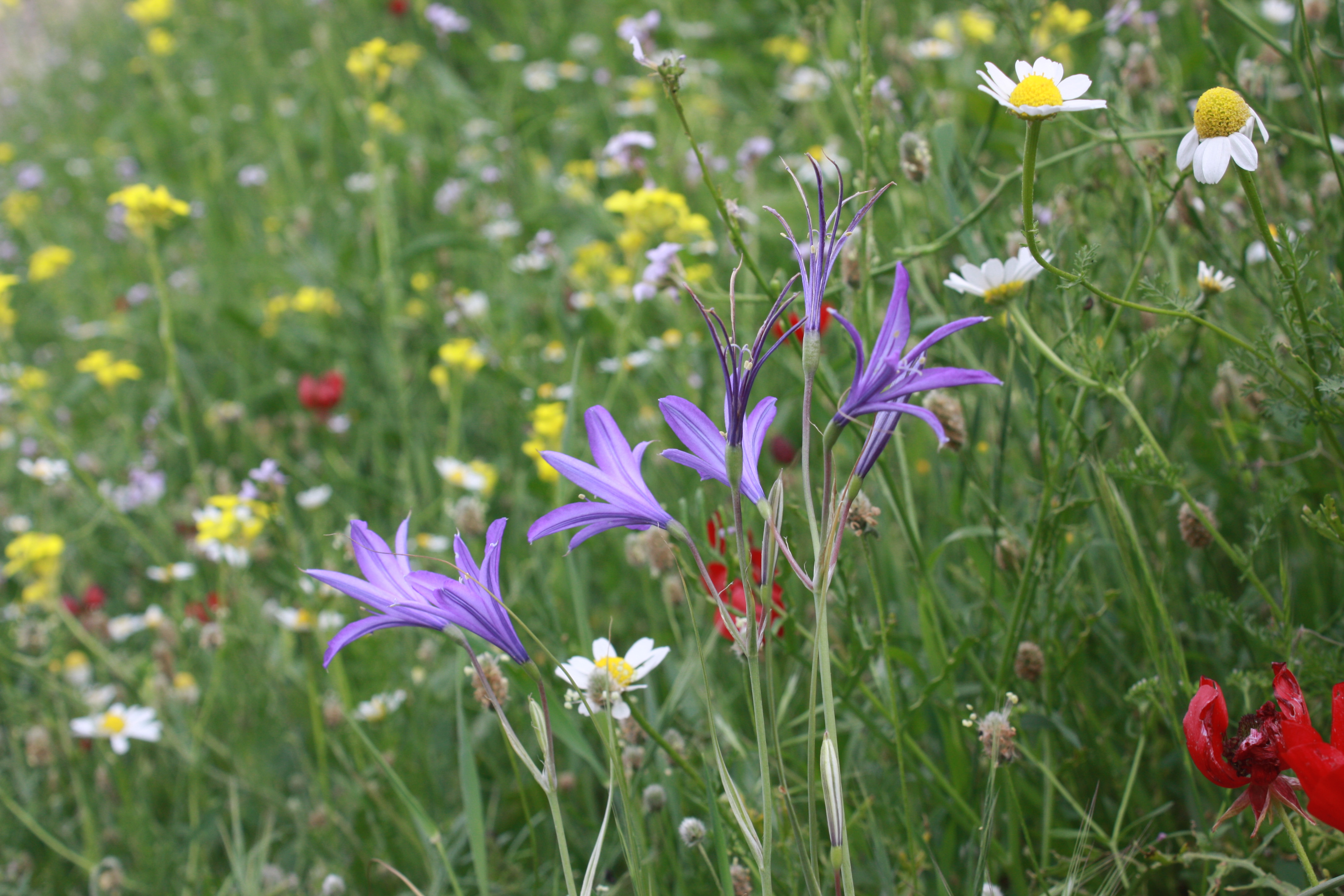
Ixiolirion tataricum in Behbahan, Iran

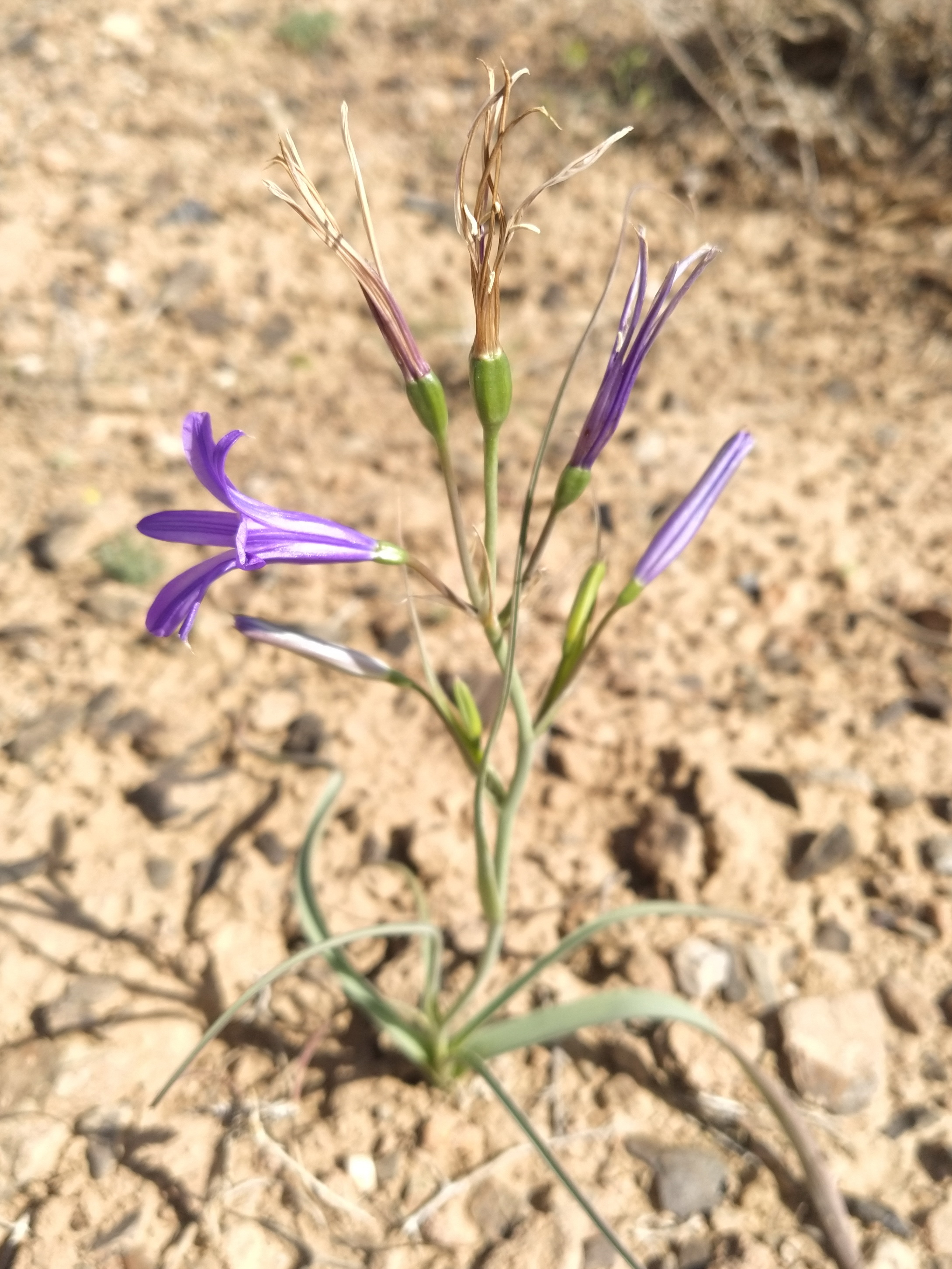
Ixiolirion tataricum in Deserts of Isfahan, Iran

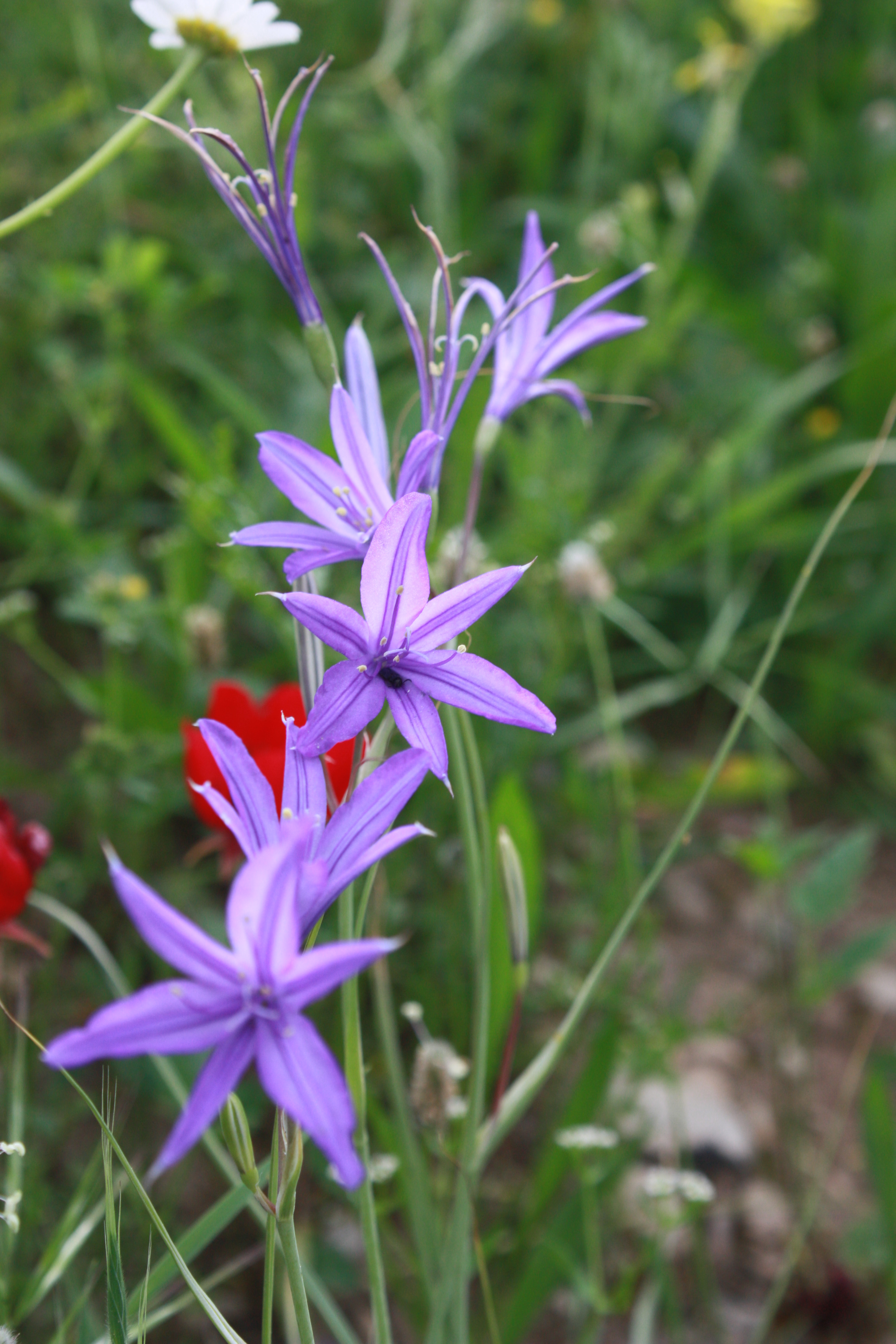
Ixiolirion tataricum in Behbahan, Iran
