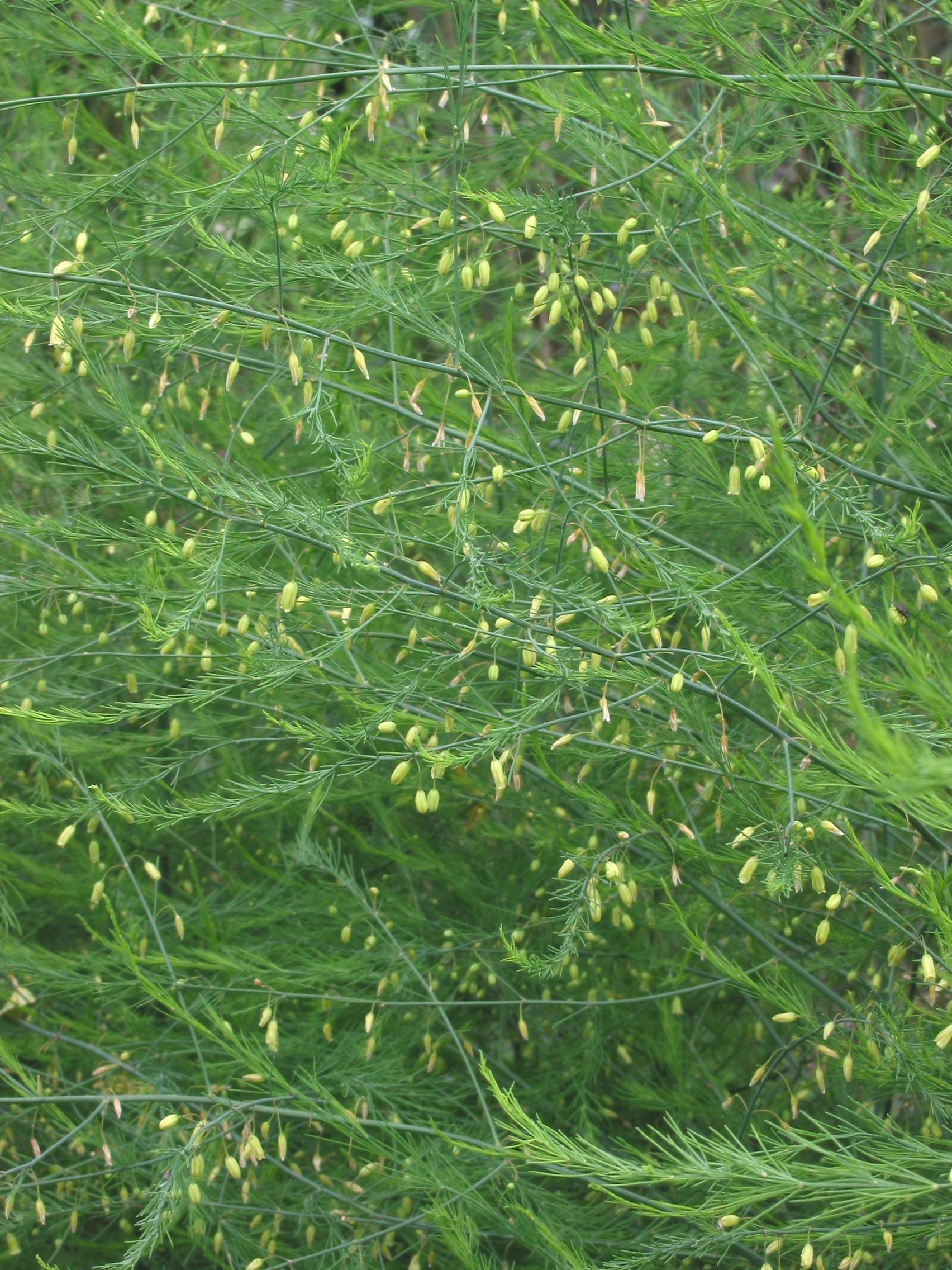
- Garden asparagus (Asparagus officinalis)

Scientific classification
- Kingdom: Plantae
- Clade: Embryophytes
- Clade: Tracheophytes
- Clade: Angiosperms
- Clade: Monocots
- Order: Asparagales; Link

Type genus
- Asparagus L.

Families
- Families: Amaryllidaceae 74; Asparagaceae 75; Asphodelaceae 73; Asteliaceae 65; Blandfordiaceae 64; Boryaceae 63; Doryanthaceae 69; Hypoxidaceae 67; Iridaceae 71; Ixioliriaceae 70; Lanariaceae 66; Orchidaceae 62; Tecophilaeaceae 68; Xeronemataceae 72 sensu LAPG

Synonyms
- Asparagales Bromhead; Iridales Dumort.

= Asparagales =

Asparagales Temporal range: Upper Cretaceous–recent

Order of monocot flowering plants

Asparagales (asparagoid lilies) are a diverse order of flowering plants in the monocots. Under the APG IV system of flowering plant classification, Asparagales are the largest order of monocots with 14 families, 1,122 genera, and about 36,000 species, with members as varied as asparaguses, orchids, yuccas, irises, onions, garlics, leeks, and other alliums, daffodils, snowdrops, amaryllis, agaves, butcher's broom, agapanthuses, Solomon's seal, hyacinths, bluebells, spider plants, grasstrees, aloes, freesias, gladioli and crocuses.

Most species of Asparagales are herbaceous perennials, although some are climbers and some are trees or shrubs. The order also contains many geophytes (bulbs, corms, and various kinds of tuber). The leaves of almost all species form a tight rosette, either at the base of the plant or at the end of the stem, but occasionally along the stem. The flowers are not particularly distinctive, being 'lily type', with six tepals and up to six stamens. One of the defining characteristics (synapomorphies) of the order is the presence of phytomelanin, a black pigment present in the seed coat, creating a dark crust. Phytomelanin is found in most families of the Asparagales (although not in Orchidaceae, thought to be the sister-group of the rest of the order).

The order Asparagales takes its name from the type family Asparagaceae and has only recently been recognized in classification systems. The order is clearly circumscribed on the basis of molecular phylogenetics, but it is difficult to define morphologically since its members are structurally diverse. The order was first put forward by Huber in 1977 and later taken up in the Dahlgren system of 1985 and then the Angiosperm Phylogeny Group systems. Before this, many of its families were assigned to the old order Liliales, which was redistributed over three orders, Liliales, Asparagales, and Dioscoreales, based on molecular phylogenetics. The boundaries of the Asparagales and of its families have undergone a series of changes in recent years; future research may lead to further changes and ultimately greater stability.

The order is thought to have first diverged from other related monocots some 120–130 million years ago (early in the Cretaceous period), although given the difficulty in classifying the families involved, estimates are likely to be uncertain.

From an economic point of view, the order Asparagales is second in importance within the monocots only to the order Poales (which includes grasses and cereals). Species are used as food and flavourings (e.g. onion, garlic, leek, asparagus, vanilla, saffron), in medicinal or cosmetic applications (Aloe), as cut flowers (e.g. freesia, gladiolus, iris, orchids), and as garden ornamentals (e.g. day lilies, lily of the valley, Agapanthus).

== Description ==
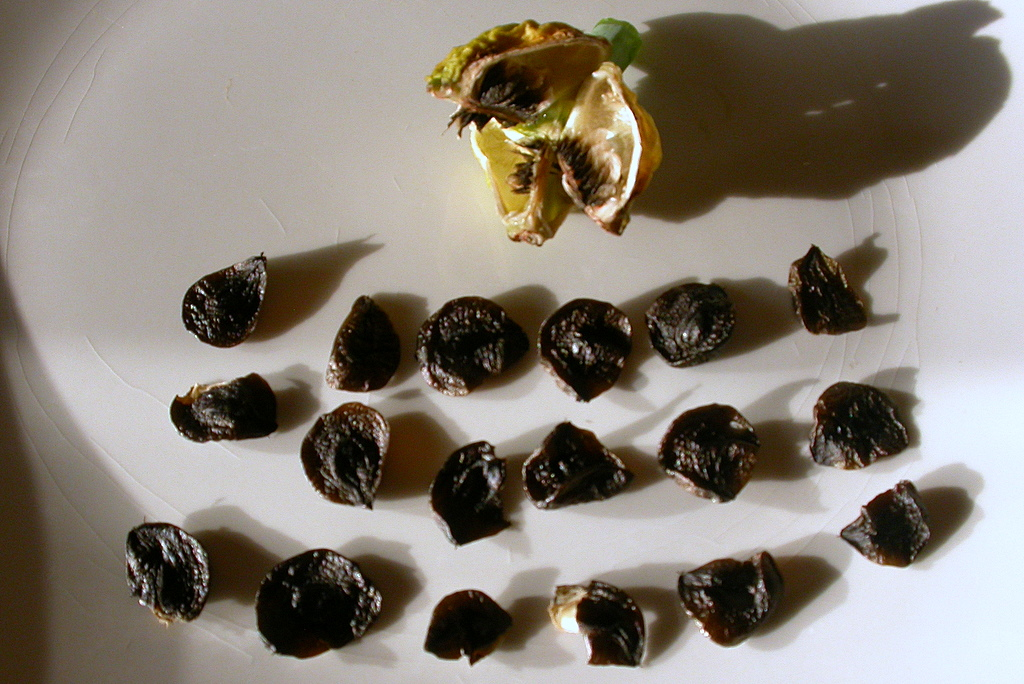
Seeds of Hippeastrum with dark phytomelan-containing coat

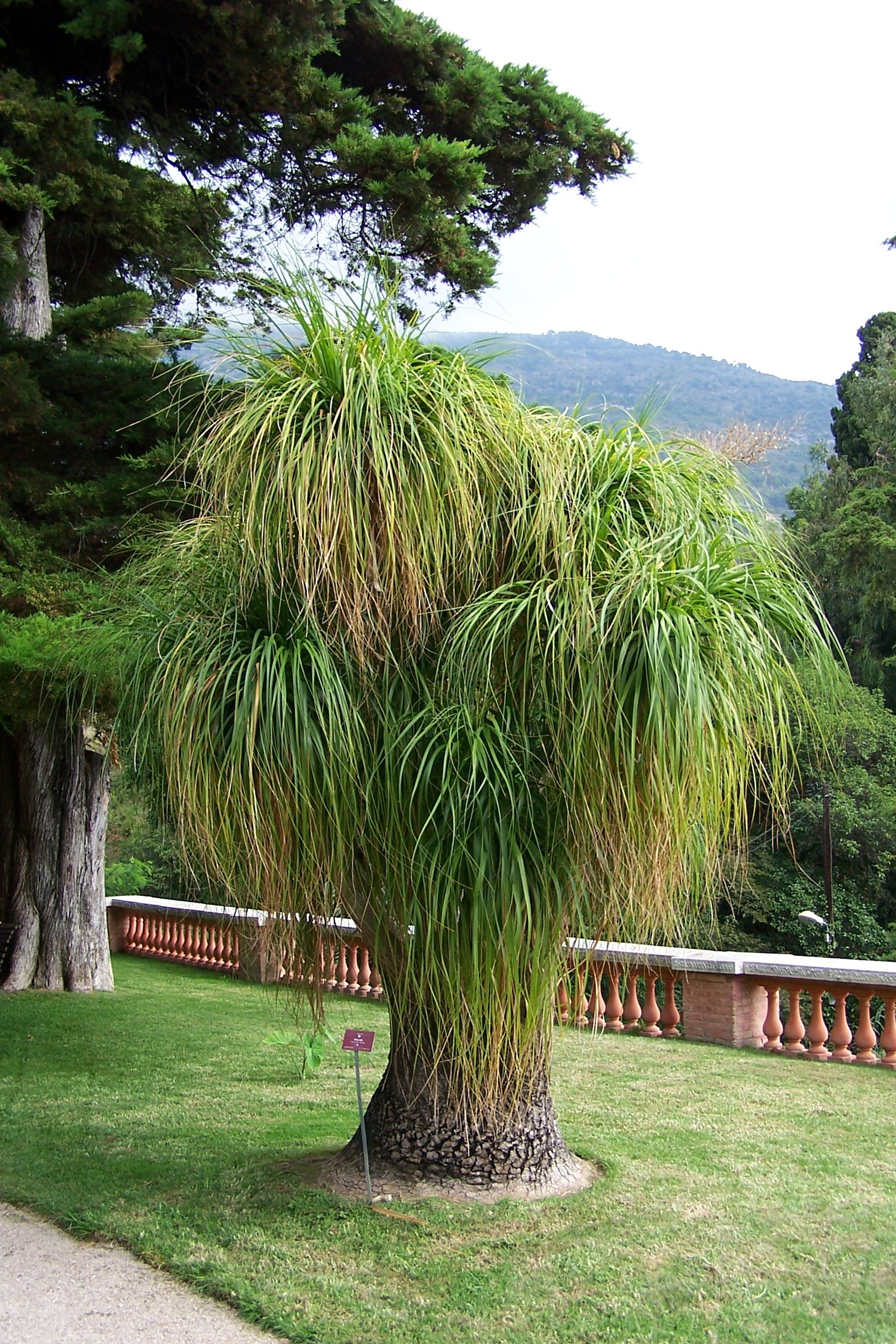
Tree form created by anomalous secondary growth in Beaucarnea recurvata

Although most species in the order are herbaceous, some no more than 15 cm high, there are a number of climbers (e.g., some species of Asparagus), as well as several genera forming trees (e.g. Agave, Cordyline, Yucca, Dracaena, Aloidendron), which can exceed 10 m in height. Succulent genera occur in several families (e.g. Aloe).

Almost all species have a tight cluster of leaves (a rosette), either at the base of the plant or at the end of a more-or-less woody stem as with Yucca. In some cases, the leaves are produced along the stem. The flowers are in the main not particularly distinctive, being of a general 'lily type', with six tepals, either free or fused from the base and up to six stamina. They are frequently clustered at the end of the plant stem.

The Asparagales are generally distinguished from the Liliales by the lack of markings on the tepals, the presence of septal nectaries in the ovaries, rather than the bases of the tepals or stamen filaments, and the presence of secondary growth. They are generally geophytes, but with linear leaves, and a lack of fine reticular venation.

The seeds characteristically have the external epidermis either obliterated (in most species bearing fleshy fruit), or if present, have a layer of black carbonaceous phytomelanin in species with dry fruits (nuts). The inner part of the seed coat is generally collapsed, in contrast to Liliales whose seeds have a well developed outer epidermis, lack phytomelanin, and usually display a cellular inner layer.

The orders which have been separated from the old Liliales are difficult to characterize. No single morphological character appears to be diagnostic of the order Asparagales.

- The flowers of Asparagales are of a general type among the lilioid monocots. Compared to Liliales, they usually have plain tepals without markings in the form of dots. If nectaries are present, they are in the septa of the ovaries rather than at the base of the tepals or stamens.
- Those species which have relatively large dry seeds have a dark, crust-like (crustose) outer layer containing the pigment phytomelan. However, some species with hairy seeds (e.g. Eriospermum, family Asparagaceae s.l.), berries (e.g. Maianthemum, family Asparagaceae s.l.), or highly reduced seeds (e.g. orchids) lack this dark pigment in their seed coats. Phytomelan is not unique to Asparagales (i.e. it is not a synapomorphy) but it is common within the order and rare outside it. The inner portion of the seed coat is usually completely collapsed. In contrast, the morphologically similar seeds of Liliales have no phytomelan, and usually retain a cellular structure in the inner portion of the seed coat.
- Most monocots are unable to thicken their stems once they have formed, since they lack the cylindrical meristem present in other angiosperm groups. Asparagales have a method of secondary thickening which is otherwise only found in Dioscorea (in the monocot order Disoscoreales). In a process called 'anomalous secondary growth', they are able to create new vascular bundles around which thickening growth occurs. Agave, Yucca, Aloidendron, Dracaena, Nolina and Cordyline can become massive trees, albeit not of the height of the tallest dicots, and with less branching. Other genera in the order, such as Lomandra and Aphyllanthes, have the same type of secondary growth but confined to their underground stems.
- Microsporogenesis (part of pollen formation) distinguishes some members of Asparagales from Liliales. Microsporogenesis involves a cell dividing twice (meiotically) to form four daughter cells. There are two kinds of microsporogenesis: successive and simultaneous (although intermediates exist). In successive microsporogenesis, walls are laid down separating the daughter cells after each division. In simultaneous microsporogenesis, there is no wall formation until all four cell nuclei are present. Liliales all have successive microsporogenesis, which is thought to be the primitive condition in monocots. It seems that when the Asparagales first diverged they developed simultaneous microsporogenesis, which the 'lower' Asparagales families retain. However, the 'core' Asparagales (see Phylogenetics) have reverted to successive microsporogenesis.
- The Asparagales appear to be unified by a mutation affecting their telomeres (a region of repetitive DNA at the end of a chromosome). The typical 'Arabidopsis-type' sequence of bases has been fully or partially replaced by other sequences, with the 'human-type' predominating.
- Other apomorphic characters of the order according to Stevens are: the presence of chelidonic acid, anthers longer than wide, tapetal cells bi- to tetra-nuclear, tegmen not persistent, endosperm helobial, and loss of mitochondrial gene sdh3.

According to telomere sequence, at least two evolutionary switch-points happened within the order. The basal sequence is formed by TTTAGGG like in the majority of higher plants. Basal motif was changed to vertebrate-like TTAGGG and finally, the most divergent motif CTCGGTTATGGG appears in Allium.

== Taxonomy ==
As circumscribed within the Angiosperm Phylogeny Group system Asparagales is the largest order within the monocotyledons, with 14 families, 1,122 genera and about 25,000–42,000 species, thus accounting for about 50% of all monocots and 10–15% of the flowering plants (angiosperms). The attribution of botanical authority for the name Asparagales belongs to Johann Heinrich Friedrich Link (1767–1851) who coined the word 'Asparaginae' in 1829 for a higher order taxon that included Asparagus although Adanson and Jussieau had also done so earlier (see History). Earlier circumscriptions of Asparagales attributed the name to Bromhead (1838), who had been the first to use the term 'Asparagales'.

=== History ===
==== Pre-Darwinian ====
The type genus, Asparagus, from which the name of the order is derived, was described by Carl Linnaeus in 1753, with ten species. He placed Asparagus within the Hexandria Monogynia (six stamens, one carpel) in his sexual classification in the Species Plantarum. The majority of taxa now considered to constitute Asparagales have historically been placed within the very large and diverse family, Liliaceae. The family Liliaceae was first described by Michel Adanson in 1763, and in his taxonomic scheme he created eight sections within it, including the Asparagi with Asparagus and three other genera. The system of organising genera into families is generally credited to Antoine Laurent de Jussieu who formally described both the Liliaceae and the type family of Asparagales, the Asparagaceae, as Lilia and Asparagi, respectively, in 1789. Jussieu established the hierarchical system of taxonomy (phylogeny), placing Asparagus and related genera within a division of Monocotyledons, a class (III) of Stamina Perigynia and 'order' Asparagi, divided into three subfamilies. The use of the term Ordo (order) at that time was closer to what we now understand as Family, rather than Order. In creating his scheme he used a modified form of Linnaeus' sexual classification but using the respective topography of stamens to carpels rather than just their numbers. While De Jussieu's Stamina Perigynia also included a number of 'orders' that would eventually form families within the Asparagales such as the Asphodeli (Asphodelaceae), Narcissi (Amaryllidaceae) and Irides (Iridaceae), the remainder are now allocated to other orders. Jussieu's Asparagi soon came to be referred to as Asparagacées in the French literature (Latin: Asparagaceae). Meanwhile, the 'Narcissi' had been renamed as the 'Amaryllidées' (Amaryllideae) in 1805, by Jean Henri Jaume Saint-Hilaire, using Amaryllis as the type species rather than Narcissus, and thus has the authority attribution for Amaryllidaceae. In 1810, Brown proposed that a subgroup of Liliaceae be distinguished on the basis of the position of the ovaries and be referred to as Amaryllideae and in 1813 de Candolle described Liliacées Juss. and Amaryllidées Brown as two quite separate families.

The literature on the organisation of genera into families and higher ranks became available in the English language with Samuel Frederick Gray's A natural arrangement of British plants (1821). Gray used a combination of Linnaeus' sexual classification and Jussieu's natural classification to group together a number of families having in common six equal stamens, a single style and a perianth that was simple and petaloid, but did not use formal names for these higher ranks. Within the grouping he separated families by the characteristics of their fruit and seed. He treated groups of genera with these characteristics as separate families, such as Amaryllideae, Liliaceae, Asphodeleae and Asparageae.

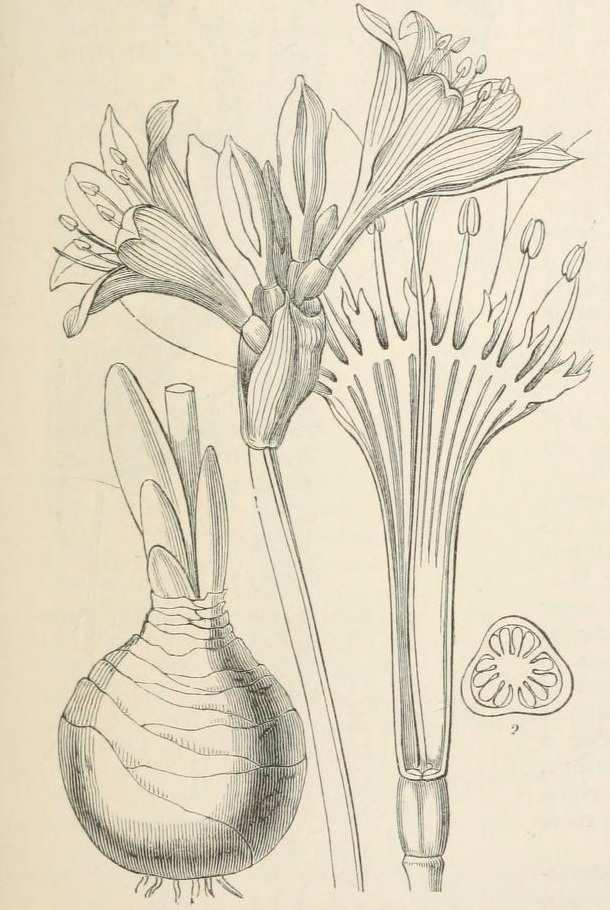
Amaryllidaceae: Narcisseae – Pancratium maritimum L. John Lindley, Vegetable Kingdom 1846

The circumscription of Asparagales has been a source of difficulty for many botanists from the time of John Lindley (1846), the other important British taxonomist of the early nineteenth century. In his first taxonomic work, An Introduction to the Natural System of Botany (1830) he partly followed Jussieu by describing a subclass he called Endogenae, or Monocotyledonous Plants (preserving de Candolle's Endogenæ phanerogamæ) divided into two tribes, the Petaloidea and Glumaceae. He divided the former, often referred to as petaloid monocots, into 32 orders, including the Liliaceae (defined narrowly), but also most of the families considered to make up the Asparagales today, including the Amaryllideae.

By 1846, in his final scheme Lindley had greatly expanded and refined the treatment of the monocots, introducing both an intermediate ranking (Alliances) and tribes within orders (i.e. families). Lindley placed the Liliaceae within the Liliales, but saw it as a paraphyletic ("catch-all") family, being all Liliales not included in the other orders, but hoped that the future would reveal some characteristic that would group them better. The order Liliales was very large and included almost all monocotyledons with colourful tepals and without starch in their endosperm (the lilioid monocots). The Liliales was difficult to divide into families because morphological characters were not present in patterns that clearly demarcated groups. This kept the Liliaceae separate from the Amaryllidaceae (Narcissales). Of these, Liliaceae was divided into eleven tribes (with 133 genera) and Amaryllidaceae into four tribes (with 68 genera), yet both contained many genera that would eventually segregate to each other's contemporary orders (Liliales and Asparagales respectively). The Liliaceae would be reduced to a small 'core' represented by the tribe Tulipae, while large groups such Scilleae and Asparagae would become part of Asparagales either as part of the Amaryllidaceae or as separate families. While of the Amaryllidaceae, the Agaveae would be part of Asparagaceae but the Alstroemeriae would become a family within the Liliales.

The number of known genera (and species) continued to grow and by the time of the next major British classification, that of the Bentham & Hooker system in 1883 (published in Latin) several of Lindley's other families had been absorbed into the Liliaceae. They used the term 'series' to indicate suprafamilial rank, with seven series of monocotyledons (including Glumaceae), but did not use Lindley's terms for these. However, they did place the Liliaceous and Amaryllidaceous genera into separate series. The Liliaceae were placed in series Coronariae, while the Amaryllideae were placed in series Epigynae. The Liliaceae now consisted of twenty tribes (including Tulipeae, Scilleae and Asparageae), and the Amaryllideae of five (including Agaveae and Alstroemerieae). An important addition to the treatment of the Liliaceae was the recognition of the Allieae as a distinct tribe that would eventually find its way to the Asparagales as the subfamily Allioideae of the Amaryllidaceae.

==== Post-Darwinian ====
The appearance of Charles Darwin's Origin of Species in 1859 changed the way that taxonomists considered plant classification, incorporating evolutionary information into their schemata. The Darwinian approach led to the concept of phylogeny (tree-like structure) in assembling classification systems, starting with Eichler. Eichler, having established a hierarchical system in which the flowering plants (angiosperms) were divided into monocotyledons and dicotyledons, further divided into former into seven orders. Within the Liliiflorae were seven families, including Liliaceae and Amaryllidaceae. Liliaceae included Allium and Ornithogalum (modern Allioideae) and Asparagus.

Engler, in his system developed Eichler's ideas into a much more elaborate scheme which he treated in a number of works including Die Natürlichen Pflanzenfamilien (Engler and Prantl 1888) and Syllabus der Pflanzenfamilien (1892–1924). In his treatment of Liliiflorae the Liliineae were a suborder which included both families Liliaceae and Amaryllidaceae. The Liliaceae had eight subfamilies and the Amaryllidaceae four. In this rearrangement of Liliaceae, with fewer subdivisions, the core Liliales were represented as subfamily Lilioideae (with Tulipae and Scilleae as tribes), the Asparagae were represented as Asparagoideae and the Allioideae was preserved, representing the alliaceous genera. Allieae, Agapantheae and Gilliesieae were the three tribes within this subfamily. In the Amaryllidaceae, there was little change from the Bentham & Hooker. A similar approach was adopted by Wettstein.

==== Twentieth century ====
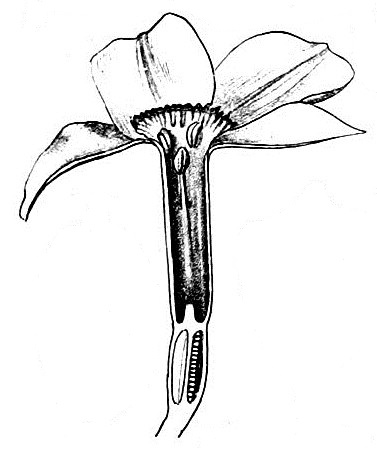
Longitudinal section of Narcissus poeticus, R Wettstein Handbuch der Systematischen Botanik 1901–1924

In the twentieth century the Wettstein system (1901–1935) placed many of the taxa in an order called 'Liliiflorae'. Next Johannes Paulus Lotsy (1911) proposed dividing the Liliiflorae into a number of smaller families including Asparagaceae. Then Herbert Huber (1969, 1977), following Lotsy's example, proposed that the Liliiflorae be split into four groups including the 'Asparagoid' Liliiflorae.

The widely used Cronquist system (1968–1988) used the very broadly defined order Liliales.

These various proposals to separate small groups of genera into more homogeneous families made little impact till that of Dahlgren (1985) incorporating new information including synapomorphy. Dahlgren developed Huber's ideas further and popularised them, with a major deconstruction of existing families into smaller units. They created a new order, calling it Asparagales. This was one of five orders within the superorder Liliiflorae. Where Cronquist saw one family, Dahlgren saw forty distributed over three orders (predominantly Liliales and Asparagales). Over the 1980s, in the context of a more general review of the classification of angiosperms, the Liliaceae were subjected to more intense scrutiny. By the end of that decade, the Royal Botanic Gardens at Kew, the British Museum of Natural History and the Edinburgh Botanical Gardens formed a committee to examine the possibility of separating the family at least for the organization of their herbaria. That committee finally recommended that 24 new families be created in the place of the original broad Liliaceae, largely by elevating subfamilies to the rank of separate families.

=== Phylogenetics ===
The order Asparagales as currently circumscribed has only recently been recognized in classification systems, through the advent of phylogenetics. The 1990s saw considerable progress in plant phylogeny and phylogenetic theory, enabling a phylogenetic tree to be constructed for all of the flowering plants. The establishment of major new clades necessitated a departure from the older but widely used classifications such as Cronquist and Thorne based largely on morphology rather than genetic data. This complicated the discussion about plant evolution and necessitated a major restructuring. rbcL gene sequencing and cladistic analysis of monocots had redefined the Liliales in 1995. from four morphological orders sensu Dahlgren. The largest clade representing the Liliaceae, all previously included in Liliales, but including both the Calochortaceae and Liliaceae sensu Tamura. This redefined family, that became referred to as core Liliales, but corresponded to the emerging circumscription of the Angiosperm Phylogeny Group (1998).

=== Phylogeny and APG system ===
The 2009 revision of the Angiosperm Phylogeny Group system, APG III, places the order in the clade monocots.

From the Dahlgren system of 1985 onwards, studies based mainly on morphology had identified the Asparagales as a distinct group, but had also included groups now located in Liliales, Pandanales and Zingiberales. Research in the 21st century has supported the monophyly of Asparagales, based on morphology, 18S rDNA, and other DNA sequences, although some phylogenetic reconstructions based on molecular data have suggested that Asparagales may be paraphyletic, with Orchidaceae separated from the rest. Within the monocots, Asparagales is the sister group of the commelinid clade.

This cladogram shows the placement of Asparagales within the orders of Lilianae sensu Chase & Reveal (monocots) based on molecular phylogenetic evidence. The lilioid monocot orders are bracketed, namely Petrosaviales, Dioscoreales, Pandanales, Liliales and Asparagales. These constitute a paraphyletic assemblage, that is groups with a common ancestor that do not include all direct descendants (in this case commelinids as the sister group to Asparagales); to form a clade, all the groups joined by thick lines would need to be included. While Acorales and Alismatales have been collectively referred to as "alismatid monocots" (basal or early branching monocots), the remaining clades (lilioid and commelinid monocots) have been referred to as the "core monocots". The relationship between the orders (with the exception of the two sister orders) is pectinate, that is diverging in succession from the line that leads to the commelinids. Numbers indicate crown group (most recent common ancestor of the sampled species of the clade of interest) divergence times in mya (million years ago).

- Lilianae sensu Chase & Reveal (monocots) 131
  - - - Acorales
      - - Alismatales
        - 122
          - Petrosaviales
          - - 120
              - Dioscoreales 115
              - Pandanales 91
            - - Liliales 121
              - 121
                - Asparagales 120
                - commelinids 118
                  - Dasypogonaceae
                  - Arecales
                  - Poales
                  - - Zingiberales
                    - Commelinales

=== Subdivision ===
A phylogenetic tree for the Asparagales, generally to family level, but including groups which were recently and widely treated as families but which are now reduced to subfamily rank, is shown below.

- Asparagales
  - Orchidaceae
  - - - Boryaceae
      - Hypoxidaceae s.l.
        - Blandfordiaceae
        - - Lanariaceae
          - - Asteliaceae
            - Hypoxidaceae
    - - - Ixioliriaceae
        - Tecophilaeaceae
      - - Doryanthaceae
        - - Iridaceae
          - - Xeronemataceae
            - - Asphodelaceae
                - Hemerocallidoideae (= Hemerocallidaceae)
                - - Asphodeloideae (= Asphodelaceae)
                  - Xanthorrhoeoideae (= Xanthorrhoeaceae s.s.)
              - 'core' Asparagales
                - Amaryllidaceae s.l.
                  - Agapanthoideae (= Agapanthaceae)
                  - - Allioideae (= Alliaceae s.s.)
                    - Amaryllidoideae (= Amaryllidaceae s.s.)
                - Asparagaceae s.l.
                  - - Lomandroideae (= Laxmanniaceae)
                    - - Asparagoideae (= Asparagaceae s.s.)
                      - Convallarioideae (= Ruscaceae)
                  - - Agavoideae (= Agavaceae)
                    - - Aphyllanthoideae (= Aphyllanthaceae)
                      - - Brodiaeoideae (= Themidaceae)
                        - Scilloideae (= Hyacinthaceae)

The tree shown above can be divided into a basal paraphyletic group, the 'lower Asparagales (asparagoids)', from Orchidaceae to Asphodelaceae, and a well-supported monophyletic group of 'core Asparagales' (higher asparagoids), comprising the two largest families, Amaryllidaceae sensu lato and Asparagaceae sensu lato.

Two differences between these two groups (although with exceptions) are: the mode of microsporogenesis and the position of the ovary. The 'lower Asparagales' typically have simultaneous microsporogenesis (i.e. cell walls develop only after both meiotic divisions), which appears to be an apomorphy within the monocots, whereas the 'core Asparagales' have reverted to successive microsporogenesis (i.e. cell walls develop after each division). The 'lower Asparagales' typically have an inferior ovary, whereas the 'core Asparagales' have reverted to a superior ovary. A 2002 morphological study by Rudall treated possessing an inferior ovary as a synapomorphy of the Asparagales, stating that reversions to a superior ovary in the 'core Asparagales' could be associated with the presence of nectaries below the ovaries. However, Stevens notes that superior ovaries are distributed among the 'lower Asparagales' in such a way that it is not clear where to place the evolution of different ovary morphologies. The position of the ovary seems a much more flexible character (here and in other angiosperms) than previously thought.

==== Changes to family structure in APG III ====
The APG III system when it was published in 2009, greatly expanded the families Xanthorrhoeaceae, Amaryllidaceae, and Asparagaceae. Thirteen of the families of the earlier APG II system were thereby reduced to subfamilies within these three families. The expanded Xanthorrhoeaceae is now called "Asphodelaceae". The APG II families (left) and their equivalent APG III subfamilies (right) are as follows:

Asphodelaceae

- Hemerocallidaceae=Hemerocallidoideae
- Xanthorrhoeaceae=Xanthorrhoeoideae
- Asphodelaceae=Asphodeloideae

Amaryllidaceae

- Agapanthaceae=Agapanthoideae
- Alliaceae =Allioideae
- Amaryllidaceae=Amaryllidoideae

Asparagaceae

- Aphyllanthaceae = Aphyllanthoideae
- Laxmanniaceae = Lomandroideae
- Asparagaceae = Asparagoideae
- Ruscaceae = Convallarioideae
- Agavaceae = Agavoideae
- Themidaceae = Brodiaeoideae
- Hyacinthaceae = Scilloideae

==== Structure of Asparagales ====
===== Orchid clade =====
Orchidaceae is possibly the largest family of all angiosperms (only Asteraceae might – or might not – be more speciose) and hence by far the largest in the order. The Dahlgren system recognized three families of orchids, but DNA sequence analysis later showed that these families are polyphyletic and so should be combined. Several studies suggest (with high bootstrap support) that Orchidaceae is the sister of the rest of the Asparagales. Other studies have placed the orchids differently in the phylogenetic tree, generally among the Boryaceae-Hypoxidaceae clade. The position of Orchidaceae shown above seems the best current hypothesis, but cannot be taken as confirmed.

Orchids have simultaneous microsporogenesis and inferior ovaries, two characters that are typical of the 'lower Asparagales'. However, their nectaries are rarely in the septa of the ovaries, and most orchids have dust-like seeds, atypical of the rest of the order. (Some members of Vanilloideae and Cypripedioideae have crustose seeds, probably associated with dispersal by birds and mammals that are attracted by fermenting fleshy fruit releasing fragrant compounds, e.g. vanilla.)

In terms of the number of species, Orchidaceae diversification is remarkable, with recent estimations suggesting that despite the old origin of the family dating back to the late cretaceous, modern orchid diversity originated mostly during the last 5 million years. However, although the other Asparagales may be less rich in species, they are more variable morphologically, including tree-like forms.

===== Boryaceae to Hypoxidaceae =====
The four families excluding Boryaceae form a well-supported clade in studies based on DNA sequence analysis. All four contain relatively few species, and it has been suggested that they be combined into one family under the name Hypoxidaceae sensu lato. The relationship between Boryaceae (which includes only two genera, Borya and Alania), and other Asparagales has remained unclear for a long time. The Boryaceae are mycorrhizal, but not in the same way as orchids. Morphological studies have suggested a close relationship between Boryaceae and Blandfordiaceae. There is relatively low support for the position of Boryaceae in the tree shown above.

===== Ixioliriaceae to Xeronemataceae =====
The relationship shown between Ixioliriaceae and Tecophilaeaceae is still unclear. Some studies have supported a clade of these two families, others have not. The position of Doryanthaceae has also varied, with support for the position shown above, but also support for other positions.

The clade from Iridaceae upwards appears to have stronger support. All have some genetic characteristics in common, having lost Arabidopsis-type telomeres. Iridaceae is distinctive among the Asparagales in the unique structure of the inflorescence (a rhipidium), the combination of an inferior ovary and three stamens, and the common occurrence of unifacial leaves whereas bifacial leaves are the norm in other Asparagales.

Members of the clade from Iridaceae upwards have infra-locular septal nectaries, which Rudall interpreted as a driver towards secondarily superior ovaries.

===== Asphodelaceae + 'core Asparagales' =====
The next node in the tree (Xanthorrhoeaceae sensu lato + the 'core Asparagales') has strong support. 'Anomalous' secondary thickening occurs among this clade, e.g. in Xanthorrhoea (family Asphodelaceae) and Dracaena (family Asparagaceae sensu lato), with species reaching tree-like proportions.

The 'core Asparagales', comprising Amaryllidaceae sensu lato and Asparagaceae sensu lato, are a strongly supported clade, as are clades for each of the families. Relationships within these broadly defined families appear less clear, particularly within the Asparagaceae sensu lato. Stevens notes that most of its subfamilies are difficult to recognize, and that significantly different divisions have been used in the past, so that the use of a broadly defined family to refer to the entire clade is justified. Thus the relationships among subfamilies shown above, based on APWeb as of December 2010, is somewhat uncertain.

=== Evolution ===
Several studies have attempted to date the evolution of the Asparagales, based on phylogenetic evidence. Earlier studies generally give younger dates than more recent studies, which have been preferred in the table below.

Approx. date in Millions of Years Ago	Event
133-120	Origin of Asparagales, i.e. first divergence from other monocots
93	Split between Asphodelaceae and the 'core group' Asparagales
91–89	Origin of Alliodeae and Asparagoideae
47	Divergence of Agavoideae and Convallarioideae

A 2009 study suggests that the Asparagales have the highest diversification rate in the monocots, about the same as the order Poales, although in both orders the rate is little over half that of the eudicot order Lamiales, the clade with the highest rate.

=== Comparison of family structures ===
The taxonomic diversity of the monocotyledons is described in detail by Kubitzki. Up-to-date information on the Asparagales can be found on the Angiosperm Phylogeny Website.

The APG III system's family circumscriptions are being used as the basis of the Kew-hosted World Checklist of Selected Plant Families. With this circumscription, the order consists of 14 families (Dahlgren had 31) with approximately 1120 genera and 26000 species.

Order Asparagales Link

- Family Amaryllidaceae J.St.-Hil. (including Agapanthaceae F.Voigt, Alliaceae Borkh.) (Note: The name 'Alliaceae' has also been used for the expanded family comprising the Alliaceae sensu stricto, Amaryllidaceae and Agapanthaceae (e.g. in the APG II system). 'Amaryllidaceae' is used as a conserved name in APG III.)
- Family Asparagaceae Juss. (including Agavaceae Dumort. [which includes Anemarrhenaceae, Anthericaceae, Behniaceae and Herreriaceae], Aphyllanthaceae Burnett, Hesperocallidaceae Traub, Hyacinthaceae Batsch ex Borkh., Laxmanniaceae Bubani, Ruscaceae M.Roem. [which includes Convallariaceae] and Themidaceae Salisb.)
- Family Asteliaceae Dumort.
- Family Blandfordiaceae R.Dahlgren & Clifford
- Family Boryaceae M.W. Chase, Rudall & Conran
- Family Doryanthaceae R.Dahlgren & Clifford
- Family Hypoxidaceae R.Br.
- Family Iridaceae Juss.
- Family Ixioliriaceae Nakai
- Family Lanariaceae R.Dahlgren & A.E.van Wyk
- Family Orchidaceae Juss.
- Family Tecophilaeaceae Leyb.
- Family Xanthorrhoeaceae Dumort. (including Asphodelaceae Juss. and Hemerocallidaceae R.Br.), now Asphodelaceae Juss.
- Family Xeronemataceae M.W.Chase, Rudall & M.F.Fay

The earlier 2003 version, APG II, allowed 'bracketed' families, i.e. families which could either be segregated from more comprehensive families or could be included in them. These are the families given under "including" in the list above. APG III does not allow bracketed families, requiring the use of the more comprehensive family; otherwise the circumscription of the Asparagales is unchanged. A separate paper accompanying the publication of the 2009 APG III system provided subfamilies to accommodate the families which were discontinued. The first APG system of 1998 contained some extra families, included in square brackets in the list above.

Two older systems which use the order Asparagales are the Dahlgren system and the Kubitzki system. The families included in the circumscriptions of the order in these two systems are shown in the first and second columns of the table below. The equivalent family in the modern APG III system (see below) is shown in the third column. Note that although these systems may use the same name for a family, the genera which it includes may be different, so the equivalence between systems is only approximate in some cases.

Families included in Asparagales in three systems which use this order
Dahlgren system	Kubitzki system	APG III system
–	Agapanthaceae	Amaryllidaceae: Agapanthoideae
Agavaceae		Asparagaceae: Agavoideae
Alliaceae		Amaryllidaceae: Allioideae
Amaryllidaceae		Amaryllidaceae: Amaryllidoideae
–	Anemarrhenaceae	Asparagaceae: Agavoideae
Anthericaceae		Asparagaceae: Agavoideae
Aphyllanthaceae		Asparagaceae: Aphyllanthoideae
Asparagaceae		Asparagaceae: Asparagoideae
Asphodelaceae		Asphodelaceae: Asphodeloideae
Asteliaceae		Asteliaceae
–	Behniaceae	Asparagaceae: Agavoideae
Blandfordiaceae		Blandfordiaceae
–	Boryaceae	Boryaceae
Calectasiaceae	—	Not in Asparagales (family Dasypogonaceae, unplaced as to order, clade commelinids)
Convallariaceae		Asparagaceae: Convallarioideae
Cyanastraceae	–	Tecophilaeaceae
Dasypogonaceae	–	Not in Asparagales (family Dasypogonaceae, unplaced as to order, clade commelinids)
Doryanthaceae		Doryanthaceae
Dracaenaceae		Asparagaceae: Convallarioideae
Eriospermaceae		Asparagaceae: Convallarioideae
Hemerocallidaceae		Asphodelaceae: Hemerocallidoideae
Herreriaceae		Asparagaceae: Agavoideae
Hostaceae		Asparagaceae: Agavoideae
Hyacinthaceae		Asparagaceae: Scilloideae
Hypoxidaceae		Hypoxidaceae
–	Iridaceae	Iridaceae
Ixioliriaceae		Ixioliriaceae
–	Johnsoniaceae	Asphodelaceae: Hemerocallidoideae
Lanariaceae		Lanariaceae
Luzuriagaceae	–	Not in Asparagales (family Alstroemeriaceae, order Liliales)
–	Lomandraceae	Asparagaceae: Lomandroideae
Nolinaceae		Asparagaceae: Convallarioideae
–	Orchidaceae	Orchidaceae
Philesiaceae	–	Not in Asparagales (family Philesiaceae, order Liliales)
Phormiaceae	–	Asphodelaceae: Hemerocallidoideae
Ruscaceae		Asparagaceae: Convallarioideae
Tecophilaeaceae		Tecophilaeaceae
–	Themidaceae	Asparagaceae: Brodiaeoideae
Xanthorrhoeaceae		Asphodelaceae: Xanthorrhoeoideae

== Uses ==
The Asparagales include many important crop plants and ornamental plants. Crops include Allium, Agave, Asparagus, and Vanilla, while ornamentals include irises, hyacinths, and orchids.

== See also ==
- Taxonomy of Liliaceae

== Bibliography ==
=== Books ===
- Columbus, J. T.; Friar, E. A.; Porter, J. M.; Prince, L. M.; Simpson, M. G., eds. (2006), "Symposium issue: Monocots: comparative biology and evolution (excluding Poales). Proceedings of the Third International Conference on the Comparative Biology of the Monocotyledons, 31 Mar–4 Apr 2003", Aliso, 22 (1), ISSN 0065-6275, contents
- Cronquist, Arthur (1968), The Evolution and Classification of Flowering Plants, London: Nelson, ISBN 978-0-17-176445-1
- Cronquist, Arthur (1981), An integrated system of classification of flowering plants, New York: Columbia University Press, ISBN 978-0-231-03880-5
- Cronquist, Arthur (1988), The Evolution and Classification of Flowering Plants (2nd ed.), New York: The New York Botanical Garden, ISBN 978-0-89327-332-3
- Dahlgren, Rolf M.; Clifford, H.T. & Yeo, P.F. (1985), The Families of the Monocotyledons: structure, evolution, and taxonomy, Berlin: Springer-Verlag, ISBN 978-3-642-64903-5
- Dimitri, M., ed. (1987), Enciclopedia Argentina de Agricultura y Jardinería, Tomo I. Descripción de plantas cultivadas, Buenos Aires: ACME S.A.C.I. * Hedges, S. Blair; Kumar, Sudhir, eds. (2009), The timetree of life, Oxford: Oxford University Press, ISBN 978-0-19-156015-6
- Hessayon, D.G. (1999), The Bulb Expert, London: Transworld Publishers Ltd, ISBN 978-0-903505-42-0
- Judd, W.S.; Campbell, C.S.; Kellogg, E.A.; Stevens, P.F.; Donoghue, M.J. (2007), "Asparagales", Plant Systematics: A Phylogenetic Approach (3rd edition), Sunderland, Massachusetts: Sinauer Associates, pp. 262–266, ISBN 978-0-87893-407-2
- Kubitzki, K., ed. (1998), The Families and Genera of Vascular Plants, Vol. III, Monocotyledons: Lilianae (except Orchidaceae), Berlin: Springer-Verlag, ISBN 978-3-540-64060-8
- Kubitzki, K., ed. (2006), The Families and Genera of Vascular Plants, Vol. IV, Monocotyledons: Alismatanae and Commelinanae (except Gramineae), Berlin: Springer-Verlag, ISBN 978-3-540-64061-5
- Simpson, Michael G. (2005), "Asparagales", Plant Systematics, Elsevier Inc., pp. 163–165, ISBN 978-0-12-644460-5
- Stuessy, Tod F. (2009), Plant Taxonomy: The Systematic Evaluation of Comparative Data, Columbia University Press, ISBN 978-0-231-14712-5
- Walters, Dirk R.; Keil, David J. (1996), "Liliaceae", Vascular Plant Taxonomy, Kendall Hunt, ISBN 978-0-7872-2108-9
- Wilson, K.L.; Morrison, D.A., eds. (2000), Monocots: Systematics and evolution, Collingwood, Australia: CSIRO, ISBN 978-0-643-06437-9
- Wilkin, Paul; Mayo, Simon J, eds. (2013), Early events in monocot evolution, Cambridge: Cambridge University Press, ISBN 978-1-107-01276-9

=== Chapters ===
- Chase, M. W.; Duvall, M. R.; Hills, H. G.; Conran, J. G.; Cox, A. V.; Eguiarte, L. E.; Hartwell, J.; Fay, M. F.; Caddick, L. R.; Cameron, K. M.; Hoot, S., Molecular phylogenetics of Lilianae, pp. 109–137, in Rudall et al. (1995)
- Davis, Jerrold I.; Mcneal, Joel R.; Barrett, Craig F.; Chase, Mark W.; Cohen, James I.; Duvall, Melvin R.; Givnish, Thomas J.; Graham, Sean W.; Petersen, Gitte; Pires, J. Chris; Seberg, Ole; Stevenson, Dennis W.; Leebens-Mack, Jim (2013), "Contrasting patterns of support among plastid genes and genomes for major clades of the monocotyledons", Early Events in Monocot Evolution, pp. 315–349, doi:10.1017/CBO9781139002950.015, ISBN 978-1-139-00295-0, in Wilkin & Mayo (2013)
- Fay, M.F.; Rudall, PJ; Sullivan, S; Stobart, KL; de Bruijn, AY; Reeves, G; Qamaruz-Zaman, F; Hong, W-P; Joseph, J; Hahn, WJ; Conran, JG; Chase, MW (19 May 2000), Phylogenetic studies of Asparagales based on four plastid DNA regions, Csiro, pp. 360–371, ISBN 978-0-643-09929-6, in Wilson & Morrison (2000)
- Nadot, S.; Penet, L.; Dreyer, L. D.; Forchioni, A.; Ressayre, A. (2006), Aperture pattern and microsporogenesis in Asparagales., pp. 197–203, in Columbus et al. (2006)
- Seberg, Ole (2007), "Xanthorrhoeaceae", in Heywood, Vernon H.; Brummitt, Richard K.; Seberg, Ole & Culham, Alastair (eds.), Flowering Plant Families of the World, Ontario, Canada: Firefly Books, pp. 406–407
- Soltis, D.E.; Soltis, P.F.; Endress, P.K. & Chase, M.W. (2005), "Asparagales", Phylogeny and evolution of angiosperms, Sunderland, MA: Sinauer Associates, pp. 104–109

=== Articles ===
- Adams, S. P.; Hartman, T. P. V.; Lim, K. Y.; Chase, M. W.; Bennett, M. D.; Leitch, I. J.; Leitch, A. R. (7 August 2001), "Loss and recovery of Arabidopsis-type telomere repeat sequences 5'-(TTTAGGG)n-3' in the evolution of a major radiation of flowering plants", Proceedings of the Royal Society B: Biological Sciences, 268 (1476): 1541–1546, doi:10.1098/rspb.2001.1726, PMC 1088775, PMID 11487399
- Chase, Mark W. (2004), "Monocot Relationships: an Overview", American Journal of Botany, 91 (10): 1645–1655, doi:10.3732/ajb.91.10.1645, PMID 21652314
- Chase, M.W.; De Bruijn, A.; Cox, A.V.; Reeves, G.; Rudall, P.J.; Johnson, M.A.T.; Eguiarte, L.E. (2000), "Phylogenetics of Asphodelaceae (Asparagales): an analysis of plastid rbcL and trnL-F DNA sequences", Annals of Botany, 86 (5): 935–951, Bibcode:2000AnBot..86..935C, doi:10.1006/anbo.2000.1262
- Chase, M.W.; Fay, M.F.; Devey, D.S.; Maurin, O.; Rønsted, N; Davies, T.J.; Pillon, Y; Petersen, G; Seberg, O; Tamura, M.N.; Lange Asmussen, C.B.; Hilu, K; Borsch, T; Davis, J.I.; Stevenson, D.W.; Pires, J.C.; Givnish, T.J.; Sytsma, K.J.; McPherson, M.A.; Graham, S.W.; Rai, H.S. (2006), "Multigene analyses of monocot relationships: a summary", Aliso, 22: 63–75, doi:10.5642/aliso.20062201.06
- Chase, M.W.; Reveal, J.L. & Fay, M.F. (2009), "A subfamilial classification for the expanded asparagalean families Amaryllidaceae, Asparagaceae and Xanthorrhoeaceae", Botanical Journal of the Linnean Society, 161 (2): 132–136, doi:10.1111/j.1095-8339.2009.00999.x
- Chen, D-K; Kim, S; Chase, MW; Kim, J-H (2013), "Networks in a Large-Scale Phylogenetic Analysis: Reconstructing Evolutionary History of Asparagales (Lilianae) Based on Four Plastid Genes", PLOS ONE, 8 (3) e59472, Bibcode:2013PLoSO...859472C, doi:10.1371/journal.pone.0059472, PMC 3605904, PMID 23544071
- Davis, J.I.; Stevenson, D.W.; Petersen, G.; Seberg, O.; Campbell, L.M.; Freudenstein, J.V.; Goldman, D.H.; Hardy, C.R.; Michelangeli, F.A.; Simmons, M.P.; Specht, C.D.; Vergara-Silva, F.; Gandolfo, M. (2004), "A phylogeny of the monocots, as inferred from rbcL and atpA sequence variation, and a comparison of methods for calculating jacknife and bootstrap values", Systematic Botany, 29 (3): 467–510, Bibcode:2004SysBo..29..467D, doi:10.1600/0363644041744365, S2CID 13108898
- Eguiarte, L.E. (1995), "Hutchinson (Agavales) vs. Huber y Dahlgren (Asparagales): análisis moleculares sobre la filogenia y evolucíón de la familia Agavaceae sensu Hutchinson dentro de las monocotiledóneas", Bull. Soc. Bot. México (in Spanish), 56: 45–56
- Furness, Carol A. & Rudall, Paula J. (1999), "Microsporogenesis in Monocotyledons", Annals of Botany, 84 (4): 475–499, Bibcode:1999AnBot..84..475F, doi:10.1006/anbo.1999.0942
- Givnish, T.J.; Pires, J.C.; Graham, S.W.; McPherson, M.A.; Prince, L.M.; Paterson, T.B.; Rai, H.S.; Roalson, E.H.; Evans, T.M.; Hahn, W.J.; Millam, K.C.; Meerow, A.W.; Molvray, M.; Kores, P.J.; O'Brien, H.E.; Hall, J.C.; Kress, W.J.; Sytsma, K J. (2006), "Phylogeny of the monocots based on the highly informative plastid gene ndhF: evidence for widespread concerted convergence", Aliso, 22 (28–51): 28–51, doi:10.5642/aliso.20062201.04
- Graham, S.W.; Zgurski, J.M.; McPherson, M.A.; Cherniawsky, D.M.; Saarela, J.M.; Horne, E.S.C.; Smith, S.Y.; Wong, W.A.; O'Brien, H.E.; Biron, V.L.; Pires, J.C.; Olmstead, R.G.; Chase, M.W.; Rai, H.S. (2006), "Robust inference of monocot deep phylogeny using an expanded multigene plastid data set" (PDF), Aliso, 22: 3–21, doi:10.5642/aliso.20062201.02, archived (PDF) from the original on 9 October 2022
- Goldblatt, P. (2002), "Iridaceae", in Argus, George W. (ed.), Flora of North America north of Mexico, Vol. 26, New York: Oxford University Press, p. 348ff, ISBN 978-0-19-515208-1
- Hertweck, Kate L.; Kinney, Michael S.; Stuart, Stephanie A.; Maurin, Olivier; Mathews, Sarah; Chase, Mark W.; Gandolfo, Maria A.; Pires, J. Chris (July 2015), "Phylogenetics, divergence times and diversification from three genomic partitions in monocots", Botanical Journal of the Linnean Society, 178 (3): 375–393, doi:10.1111/boj.12260, hdl:1959.14/356756
- Hilu, K.; Borsch, T.; Muller, K.; Soltis, D.E.; Soltis, P.S.; Savolainen, V.; Chase, M.W.; Powell, M.P.; Alice, L.A.; Evans, R.; Sauquet, H.; Neinhuis, C.; Slotta, T.A.B.; Rohwer, J.G.; Campbell, C. S.; Chatrou, L.W. (2003), "Angiosperm phylogeny based on matK sequence information", American Journal of Botany, 90 (12): 1758–1766, doi:10.3732/ajb.90.12.1758, PMID 21653353
- Huber, H (1969), "Die Samenmerkmale und Verwandtschaftsverhältnisse der Liliiflorae", Mitt. Bot. Staatssamml.[Mitteilungen der Botanischen Staatssammlung München], 8: 219–538
- Huber, H. (1977), "The treatment of monocotyledons in an evolutionary system of classification", in Kubitzki, Klaus (ed.), Flowering plants: Evolution and classification of higher categories. Symposium, Hamburg, September 8–12, 1976, Plant Systematics and Evolution, vol. Supplementum 1, Wien: Springer, pp. 285–298, doi:10.1007/978-3-7091-7076-2_18, ISBN 978-3-211-81434-5
- Janssen, T. & Bremer, K. (2004), "The age of major monocot groups inferred from 800+ rbcL sequences" (PDF), Bot. J. Linn. Soc., 146 (4): 385–398, doi:10.1111/j.1095-8339.2004.00345.x, archived (PDF) from the original on 9 October 2022
- Kelch, D. G. (2002), "Consider the Lilies" (PDF), Fremontia, 30 (2): 23–29, archived (PDF) from the original on 9 October 2022
- Leitch, I. J. (1 January 2005), "Evolution of DNA Amounts Across Land Plants (Embryophyta)", Annals of Botany, 95 (1): 207–217, doi:10.1093/aob/mci014, PMC 4246719, PMID 15596468
- Li, X.-X. & Zhou, Z.-K. (2007), "The higher-level phylogeny of monocots based on matK,rbcL and 18S rDNA sequences", Acta Phytotax. Sinica (in Chinese), 45: 113–133
- Lobstein, Marion Blois (May 2013), Where Have All the Lillies Gone? Long-Time Changin' in the Liliaceous Families, Prince William Wildflower Society
- Magallón, S. & Castillo, A. (2009), "Angiosperm diversification through time", American Journal of Botany, 96 (1): 349–365, doi:10.3732/ajb.0800060, PMID 21628193
- Mathew, Brian (1989), "Splitting the Liliaceae", The Plantsman, 11 (2): 89–105
- McPherson, M.A. & Graham, S.W. (2001), "Inference of Asparagales phylogeny using a large chloroplast data set", Botany: 126
- Patterson, T. B.; Givnish, T. J. (2002), "Phylogeny, concerted convergence, and phylogenetic niche conservatism in the core Liliales: insights from rbcL and ndhF sequence data", Evolution, 56 (2): 233–252, doi:10.1111/j.0014-3820.2002.tb01334.x, PMID 11926492, S2CID 39420833
- Pires, J. C.; Sytsma, K. J. (1 August 2002), "A phylogenetic evaluation of a biosystematic framework: Brodiaea and related petaloid monocots (Themidaceae)", American Journal of Botany, 89 (8): 1342–1359, doi:10.3732/ajb.89.8.1342, PMID 21665737
- Pires, J.C.; Maureira, I.J.; Givnish, T.J.; Sytsma, K.J.; Seberg, O.; Petersen, G.; Davis, J. I.; Stevenson, D.W.; Rudall, P.J.; Fay, M.F.; Chase, M.W. (2006), "Phylogeny, genome size, and chromosome evolution of Asparagales", Aliso, 22: 278–304, doi:10.5642/aliso.20062201.24
- Reveal, James L (18 June 2010), "A checklist of familial and suprafamilial names for extant vascular plants", Phytotaxa, 6: 1–402, doi:10.11646/phytotaxa.6.1.1
- Rudall, P.J.; Cribb, P.J.; Cutler, D.F.; Humphries, C.J., eds. (1995), Monocotyledons: systematics and evolution (Proceedings of the International Symposium on Monocotyledons: Systematics and Evolution, Kew 1993), Kew: Royal Botanic Gardens, ISBN 978-0-947643-85-0
- Rudall, Paula (1995), "New records of secondary thickening in monocotyledons" (PDF), IAWA Journal, 16 (3): 261–8, doi:10.1163/22941932-90001409, archived (PDF) from the original on 9 October 2022
- Rudall, Paula (2002a), "Unique floral structures and iterative evolutionary themes in Asparagales: insights from a morphological cladistic analysis", The Botanical Review, 68 (4): 488–509, doi:10.1663/0006-8101(2002)068[0488:UFSAIE]2.0.CO;2, S2CID 24862159
- Rudall, Paula J. (2002b), "Homologies of inferior ovaries and septal nectaries in monocotyledons", International Journal of Plant Sciences, 163 (2): 261–276, Bibcode:2002IJPlS.163..261R, doi:10.1086/338323, JSTOR 3080242, S2CID 84714002
- Fajkus, P.; Peška, V.; Sitová, Z.; Fulnečková, J.; Dvořáčková, M.; Gogela, R.; Sýkorová, E.; Hapala, J. & Fajkus, J. (2016), "Allium telomeres unmasked: the unusual telomeric sequence (CTCGGTTATGGG)n is synthesized by telomerase.", The Plant Journal, 85 (3): 337–47, doi:10.1111/tpj.13115, hdl:11104/0258047, PMID 26716914
- Rudall, P.; Furness, C.A.; Chase, M.W. & Fay, M.F. (1997), "Microsporogenesis and pollen sulcus type in Asparagales (Lilianae)", Can. J. Bot., 75 (3): 408–430, Bibcode:1997CaJB...75..408R, doi:10.1139/b97-044
- Seberg, O.; Petersen, G.; Davis, J. I.; Pires, J. C.; Stevenson, D. W.; Chase, M. W.; Fay, M. F.; Devey, D. S.; Jorgensen, T.; Sytsma, K. J.; Pillon, Y. (26 April 2012), "Phylogeny of the Asparagales based on three plastid and two mitochondrial genes", American Journal of Botany, 99 (5): 875–889, Bibcode:2012AmJB...99..875S, doi:10.3732/ajb.1100468, PMID 22539521
- Sykorova, E.; Lim, K. Y.; Kunicka, Z.; Chase, M. W.; Bennett, M. D.; Fajkus, J.; Leitch, A. R. (22 September 2003), "Telomere variability in the monocotyledonous plant order Asparagales", Proceedings of the Royal Society B: Biological Sciences, 270 (1527): 1893–1904, doi:10.1098/rspb.2003.2446, PMC 1691456, PMID 14561302
- Tapiero, Haim; Townsend, Danyelle M.; Tew, Kenneth D. (2004), "Alliaceae from organosulfur compounds in the prevention of human pathologies", Biomedicine & Pharmacotherapy, 58 (3): 183–193, doi:10.1016/j.biopha.2004.01.004, PMC 6361170, PMID 15164729
- Sýkorová, E.; Lim, K.Y.; Kunicka, Z.; Chase, M.W.; Bennett, M.D.; Fajkus, J.; Leitch, A.R. (2003), "Telomere variability in the monocotyledonous plant order Asparagales", Proceedings of the Royal Society B, 270 (1527): 1893–1904, doi:10.1098/rspb.2003.2446, PMC 1691456, PMID 14561302
- Wikström, N.; Savolainen, V. & Chase, M.W. (2001), "Evolution of the angiosperms: calibrating the family tree", Proceedings of the Royal Society B, 268 (1482): 2211–2220, doi:10.1098/rspb.2001.1782, PMC 1088868, PMID 11674868

=== APG ===
- Angiosperm Phylogeny Group I (1998), "An ordinal classification for the families of flowering plants", Annals of the Missouri Botanical Garden, 85 (4): 531–553, Bibcode:1998AnMBG..85..531., doi:10.2307/2992015, JSTOR 2992015
- Angiosperm Phylogeny Group II (2003), "An update of the Angiosperm Phylogeny Group classification for the orders and families of flowering plants: APG II", Botanical Journal of the Linnean Society, 141 (4): 399–436, doi:10.1046/j.1095-8339.2003.t01-1-00158.x
- Angiosperm Phylogeny Group III (2009), "An update of the Angiosperm Phylogeny Group classification for the orders and families of flowering plants: APG III", Botanical Journal of the Linnean Society, 161 (2): 105–121, doi:10.1111/j.1095-8339.2009.00996.x, hdl:10654/18083
- APG IV (2016), "An update of the Angiosperm Phylogeny Group classification for the orders and families of flowering plants: APG IV", Botanical Journal of the Linnean Society, 181 (1): 1–20, doi:10.1111/boj.12385
- Chase, Mark W; Reveal, James L (2009), "A phylogenetic classification of the land plants to accompany APG III" (PDF), Botanical Journal of the Linnean Society, 161 (2): 122–127, doi:10.1111/j.1095-8339.2009.01002.x, archived (PDF) from the original on 9 October 2022
- Chase, Mark W.; Reveal, James L.; Fay, Michael F. (2009), "A subfamilial classification for the expanded asparagalean families Amaryllidaceae, Asparagaceae and Xanthorrhoeaceae", Botanical Journal of the Linnean Society, 161 (2): 132–136, doi:10.1111/j.1095-8339.2009.00999.x
- Haston, Elspeth; Richardson, James E.; Stevens, Peter F.; Chase, Mark W.; Harris, David J. (2009), "The Linear Angiosperm Phylogeny Group (LAPG) III: a linear sequence of the families in APG III", Botanical Journal of the Linnean Society, 161 (2): 128–131, doi:10.1111/j.1095-8339.2009.01000.x

=== Historical sources ===
- Linnaeus, C. (1753), Species Plantarum, Stockholm: Laurentii Salvii
- Adanson, Michel (1763), Familles des plantes, Paris: Vincent
- Jussieu, Antoine Laurent de (1789), Genera Plantarum, secundum ordines naturales disposita juxta methodum in Horto Regio Parisiensi exaratam, Paris: apud viduam Herissant et Theophilum Barrois, OCLC 5161409
- Jaume Saint-Hilaire, Jean Henri (1805), Exposition de familles naturales, Paris: Treutel et Würtz
- de Candolle, A. P. (1813), Théorie élémentaire de la botanique, ou exposition des principes de la classification naturelle et de l'art de décrire et d'etudier les végétaux
- Brown, Robert (1810), Prodromus florae Novae Hollandiae et Insulae Van-Diemen, exhibens characteres plantarum, London: Taylor
- Gray, Samuel Frederick (1821), A natural arrangement of British plants: according to their relations to each other as pointed out by Jussieu, De Candolle, Brown, &c. including those cultivated for use; with an introduction to botany, in which the terms newly introduced are explained, London: Baldwin
- Link, Johann Heinrich Friedrich (1829), Handbuch zur Erkennung der nutzbarsten und am häufigsten vorkommenden Gewächse, Berlin: Haude und Spener, digital edition by the University and State Library Düsseldorf
- Bromhead, Edward Ffrench (1838), "An Attempt to ascertain Characters of the Botanical Alliances", Edinburgh New Philosophical Journal, 25: 123–134
- Lindley, John (1830), An introduction to the natural system of botany : or, A systematic view of the organisation, natural affinities, and geographical distribution, of the whole vegetable kingdom: together with the uses of the most important species in medicine, the arts, and rural or domestic economy, London: Longman
- Lindley, John (1846), "Order LXII: Liliaceae – Lilyworts", The Vegetable Kingdom: or, The structure, classification, and uses of plants, illustrated upon the natural system, London: Bradbury, pp. 200–205
- Bentham, G.; Hooker, J.D. (1883), "Liliaceae", Genera plantarum ad exemplaria imprimis in herbariis kewensibus servata definita. Vol III Part II, vol. 3, London: L Reeve & Co., pp. 748–836
- Eichler, August W. (1886) [1876], Syllabus der Vorlesungen über specielle und medicinisch-pharmaceutische Botanik (4th ed.), Berlin: Borntraeger
- Engler, Adolf; Prantl, Karl, eds. (1888), Die Natürlichen Pflanzenfamilien nebst ihren Gattungen und wichtigeren Arten, insbesondere den Nutzpflanzen, unter Mitwirkung zahlreicher hervorragender Fachgelehrten 1887–1915 II(5), Leipzig: W. Engelmann
- Engler, Adolf, ed. (1900–1968), Das Pflanzenreich :regni vegetablilis conspectus, Leipzig: Engelmann
- Engler, Adolf, ed. (1903), Syllabus der Pflanzenfamilien: eine Übersicht über das gesamte Pflanzensystem mit Berücksichtigung der Medicinal- und Nutzpflanzen nebst einer Übersicht über die Florenreiche und Florengebiete der Erde zum Gebrauch bei Vorlesungen und Studien über specielle und medicinisch-pharmaceutische Botanik (3 ed.), Berlin: Gebrüder Borntraeger Verlag
- Wettstein, Richard (1924), Handbuch der Systematischen Botanik 2 vols. (3rd ed.), archived from the original on 18 February 2015, 1st ed. 1901–1908; 2nd ed. 1910–1911; 3rd ed. 1923–1924; 4th ed. 1933–1935
- Lotsy, Johannes Paulus (1907–1911), Vorträge über botanische Stammesgeschichte, gehalten an der Reichsuniversität zu Leiden. Ein Lehrbuch der Pflanzensystematik., Jena: Fischer

=== Websites ===
- "Asparagales Link", Tropicos, Missouri Botanical Garden, 2015
- University of California Museum of Paleontology, Asparagales
- Royal Botanic Gardens, Kew (2016), Monocots I: General Alismatids & Lilioids, archived from the original on 14 September 2015
- WCSP (2010), World Checklist of Selected Plant Families, Royal Botanic Gardens, Kew: Families included in the checklist
- Stevens, P.F. (2016) [2001], Angiosperm Phylogeny Website, Missouri Botanical Gardens
- Kress, W.J. (2016), Asparagales, Encyclopædia Britannica

=== Reference materials ===
- ICN (2011), International Code of Nomenclature for algae, fungi, and plants, Bratislava: International Association for Plant Taxonomy
- Privat-Deschanel, Augustin; Focillon, Adolphe Jean, eds. (1870), Dictionnaire général des sciences théoriques et appliquées, Paris: Delagrave
