= Jean Henri Jaume Saint-Hilaire =

French naturalist and artist (1772–1845)

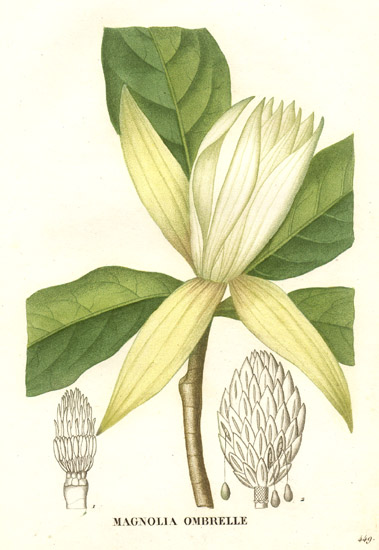
Magnolia tripetala, as illustrated by Jaume, in La flore et la pomone françaises.

Jean Henri Jaume Saint-Hilaire (October 29, 1772 – 1845) was a French naturalist and artist, born in Grasse, France.

== Biography ==
Born as Jaume, he added Saint-Hilaire later. Some biographers indicate that this addition was to distinguish himself from a family member, Henri-Honore Jaume, a Jacobin who had been involved in the Reign of Terror, during the French Revolution. He served in the French Army during the Italian campaign, before returning to civilian life in 1800. He then returned to Paris and resumed his studies, especially natural history. He wrote a guide to the new Muséum National d'Histoire Naturelle, and learned floral painting from Gérard van Spaendonck (1746-1822).

In 1805 he wrote his first important publication: Exposition des familles naturelles et de la germination des plantes, contentant la description de 2 337 genres et d'environ 4 000 espèces, 112 planches dont les figures ont ete dessinées par l'auteur [An exposition about natural families and the germination of plants, containing the description of 2,337 genera and about 4,000 species, 112 plates whose figures were drawn by the author]. In it, he popularized the classification of Antoine-Laurent de Jussieu (1748-1836). During 1808-1809 and 1819–1822, Jaume published ten volumes about French plants: Plantes de la France décrites et peintes d’après nature [French plants described and painted from nature], grouping together one thousand engravings that he had made himself.

Jaume was quite interested in forests, and became a member of Société Royale d’Agriculture in 1831. He also became interested in the culture of Wrightia tinctoria, a member of the plant family Apocynaceae used for its dyeing qualities.

== List of selected publications ==
- Saint-Hilaire, Jean Henri Jaume (1805). Exposition des familles naturelles et de la germination des plantes, contentant la description de 2 337 genres et d'environ 4 000 espèces, 112 planches dont les figures ont été dessinées par l'auteur. vol I. Paris: Treuttel et Würtz.
- Saint-Hilaire, Jean Henri Jaume (1805). Exposition des familles naturelles et de la germination des plantes, contentant la description de 2 337 genres et d'environ 4 000 espèces, 112 planches dont les figures ont été dessinées par l'auteur. vol II. Paris: Treuttel et Würtz.
- Exposition des familles naturelles et de la germination des plantes, contentant la description de 2 337 genres et d'environ 4 000 espèces, 112 planches dont les figures ont été dessinées par l'auteur, 1805
- La flore et la pomone françaises: histoire et figure en couleur, des fleurs et des fruits de France ou naturalisés sur le sol français. (Published by the author: Paris, Rue Furstemberg, 1828–1833).
- Traité des arbres forestiers: ou histoire et description des arbres indigènes ou naturalisés. A work preceded by une instruction sur la culture des arbres, by M. Thouin. (Printed by Firmin Didot, Paris, 1824).
- Traité des arbrisseaux et des arbustes cultivés en France et en pleine terre. (Published by the author: Paris, 1825).

== Sources ==
- Roger L. Williams (1988), Gerard and Jaume: Two Neglected Figures in the History of Jussiaean Classification (Part Three). Taxon, Vol. 37 (2, May, 1988) : 233–271.
