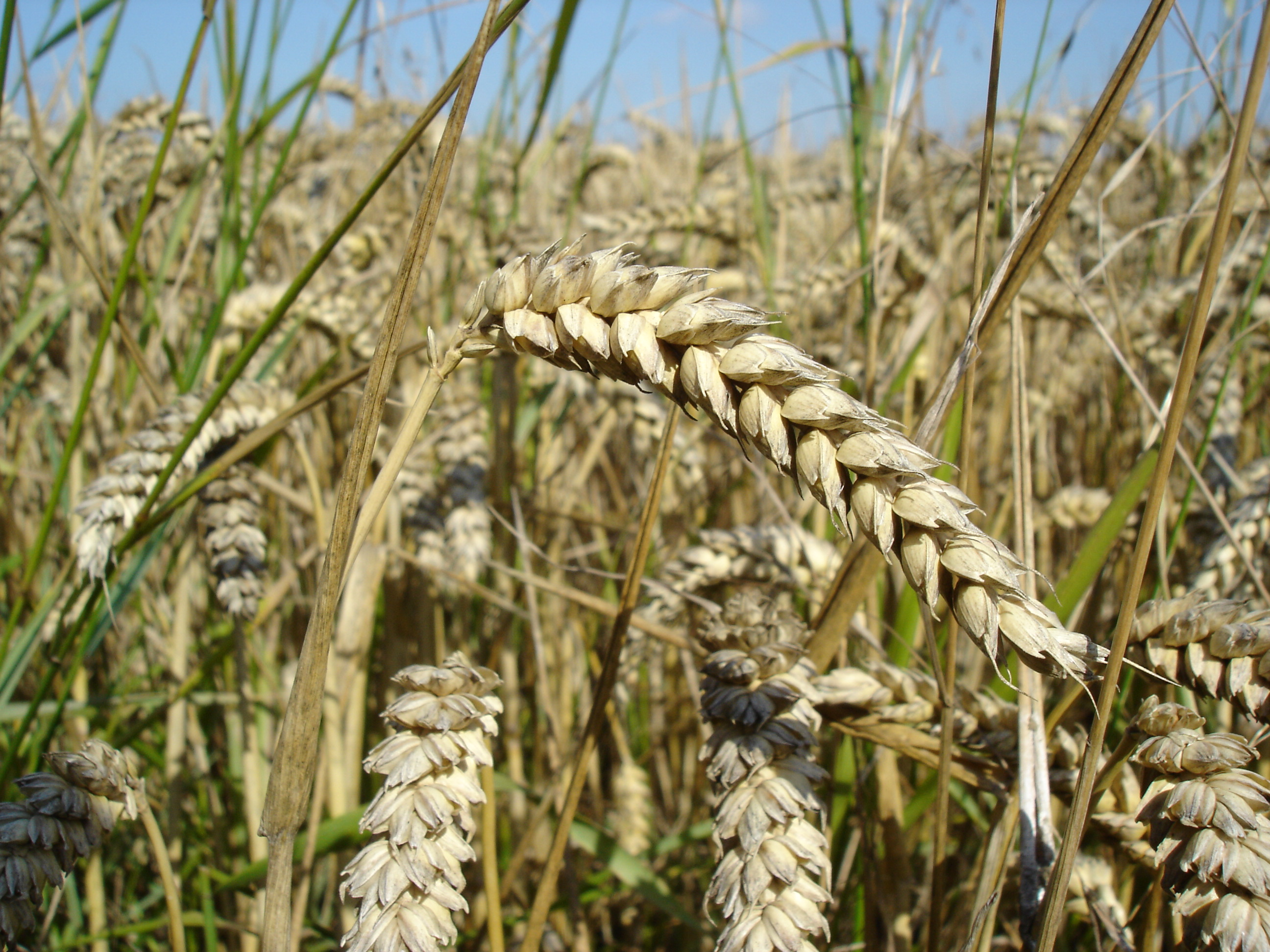
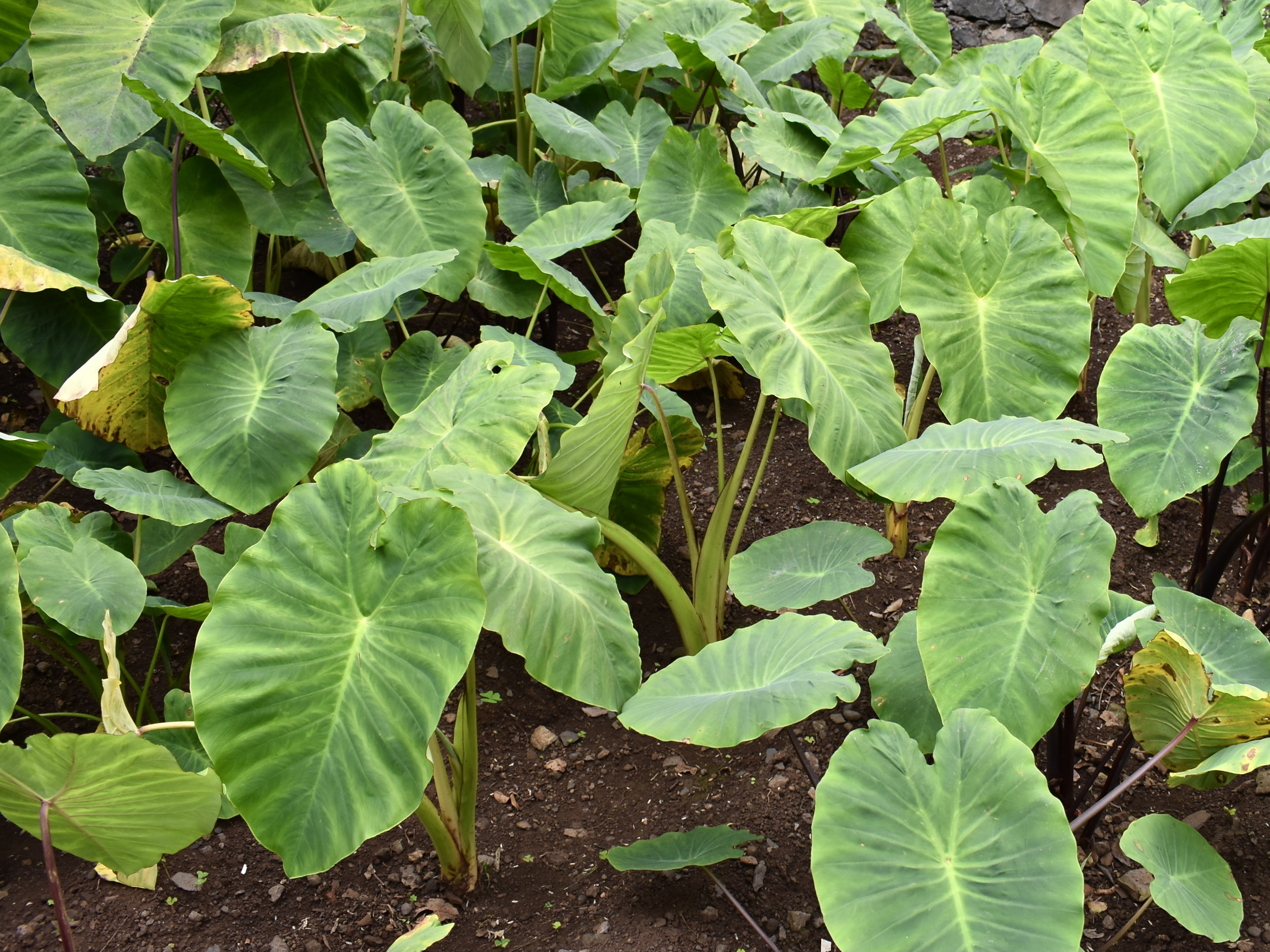
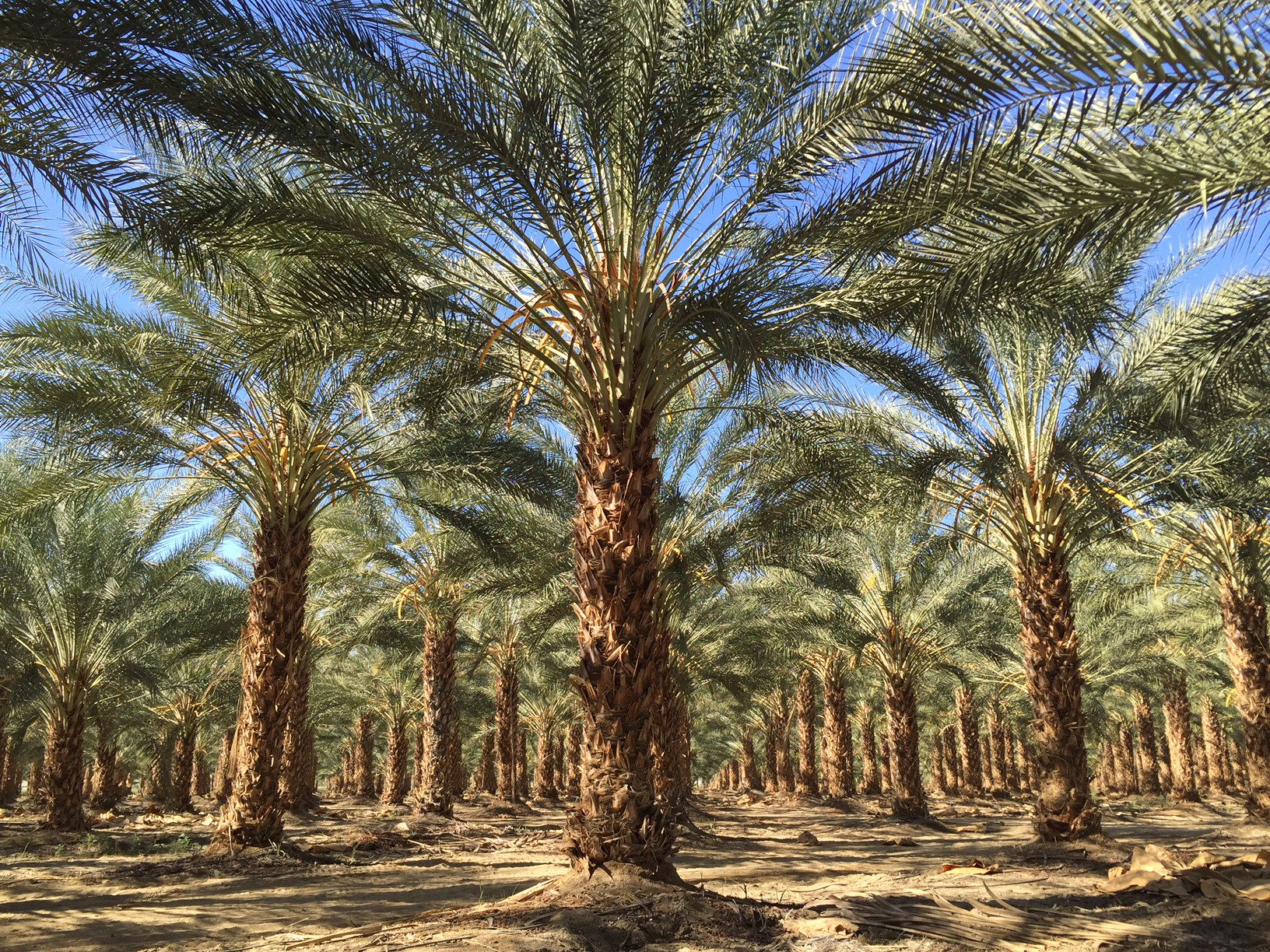
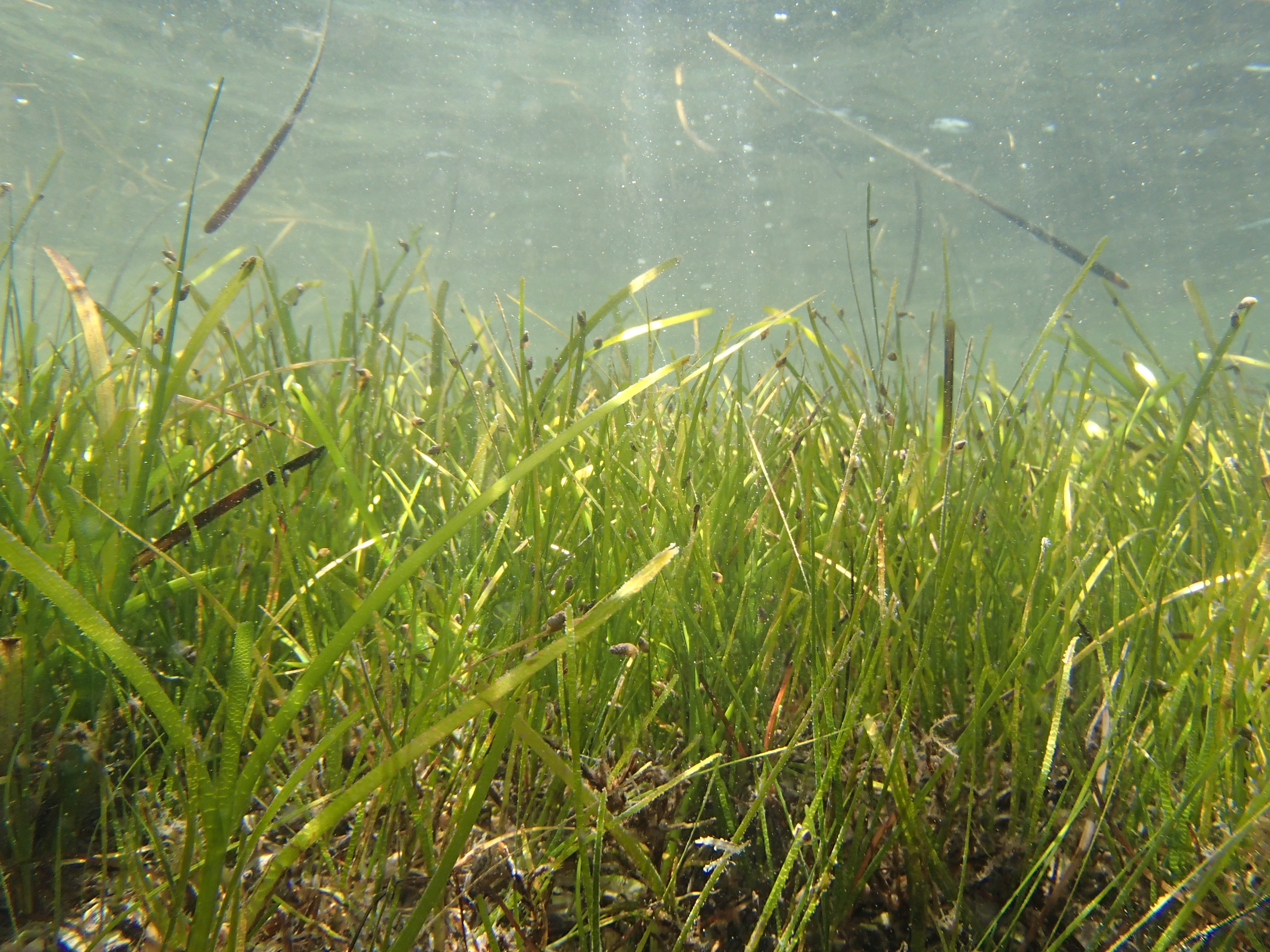
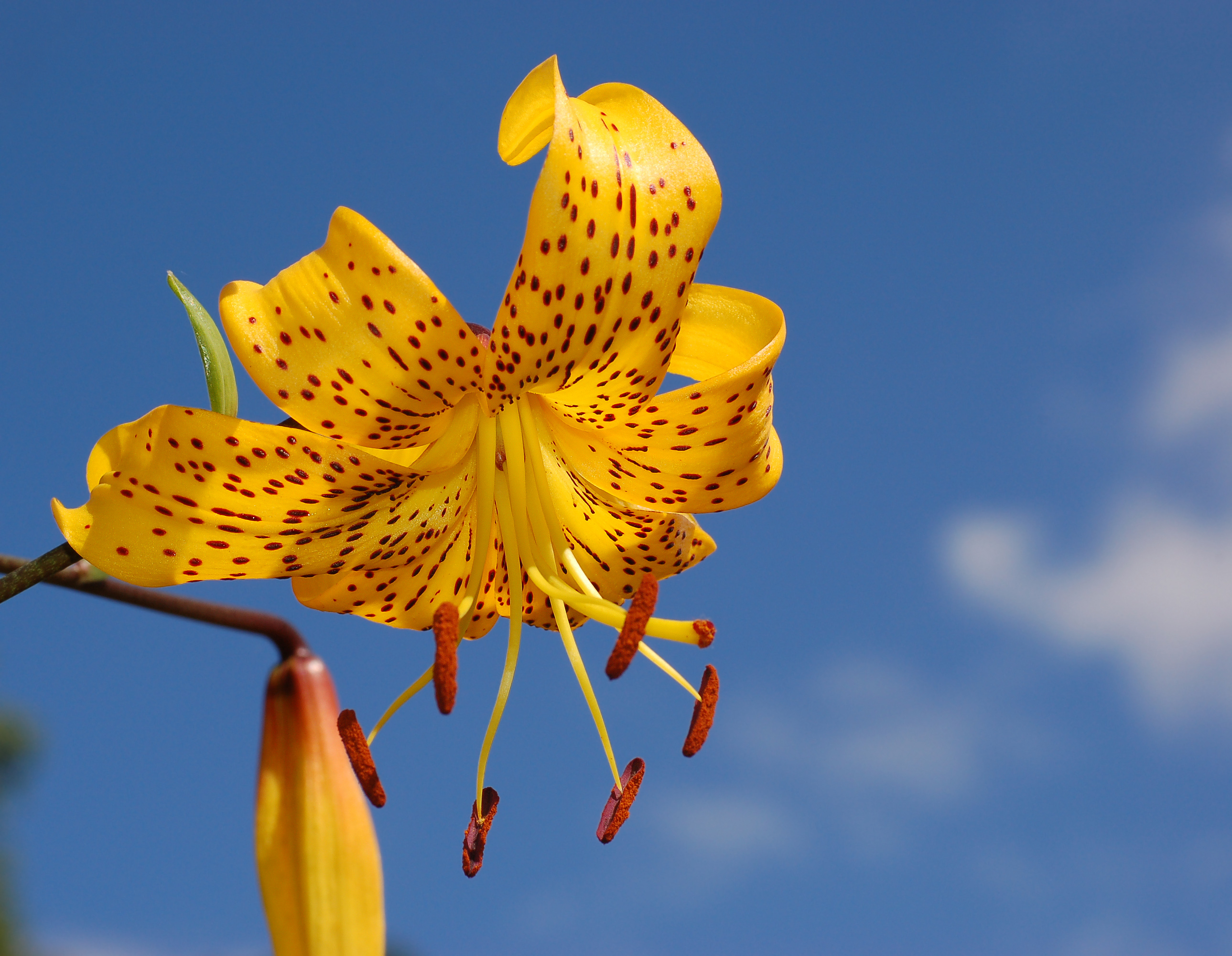
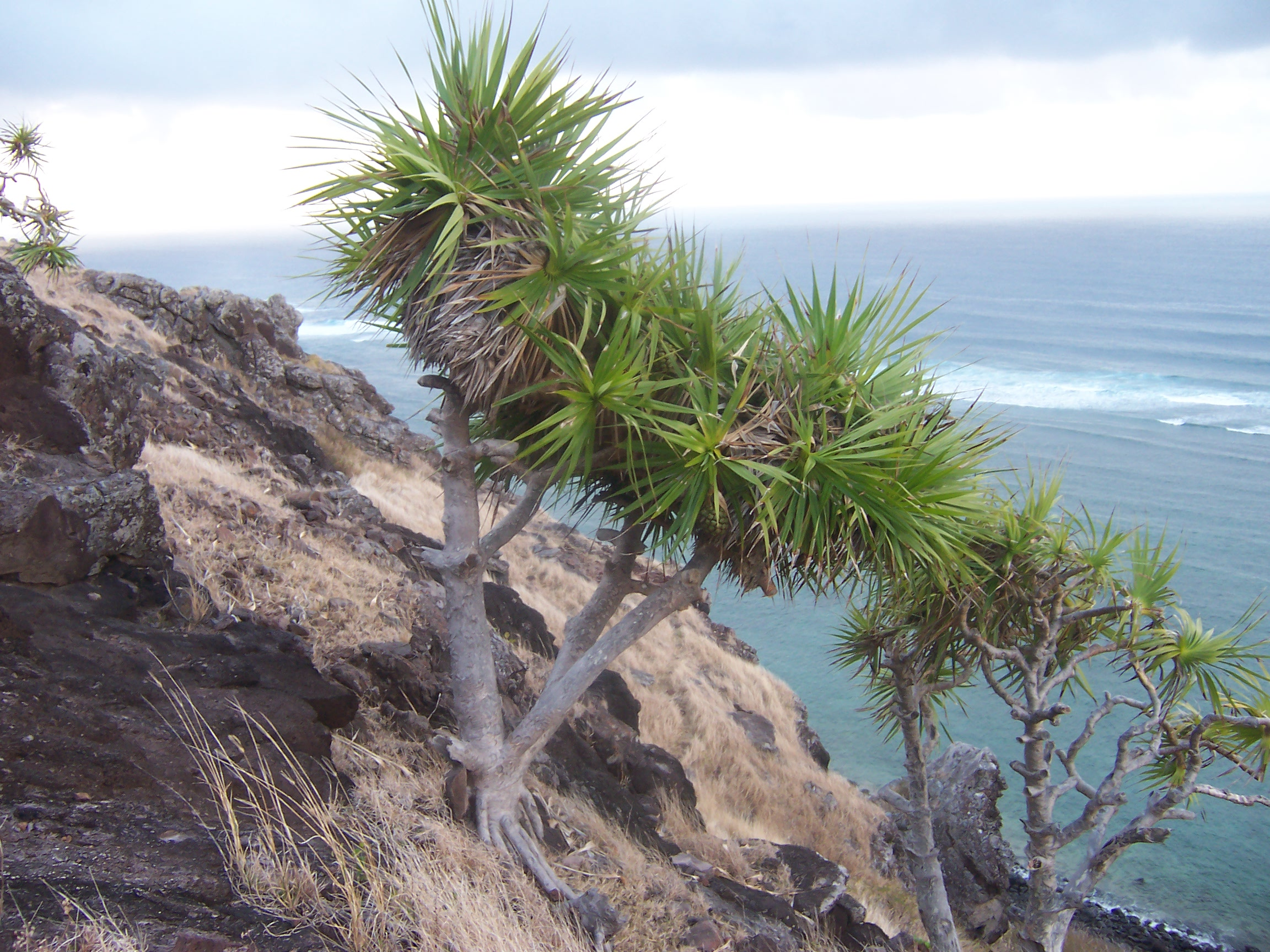
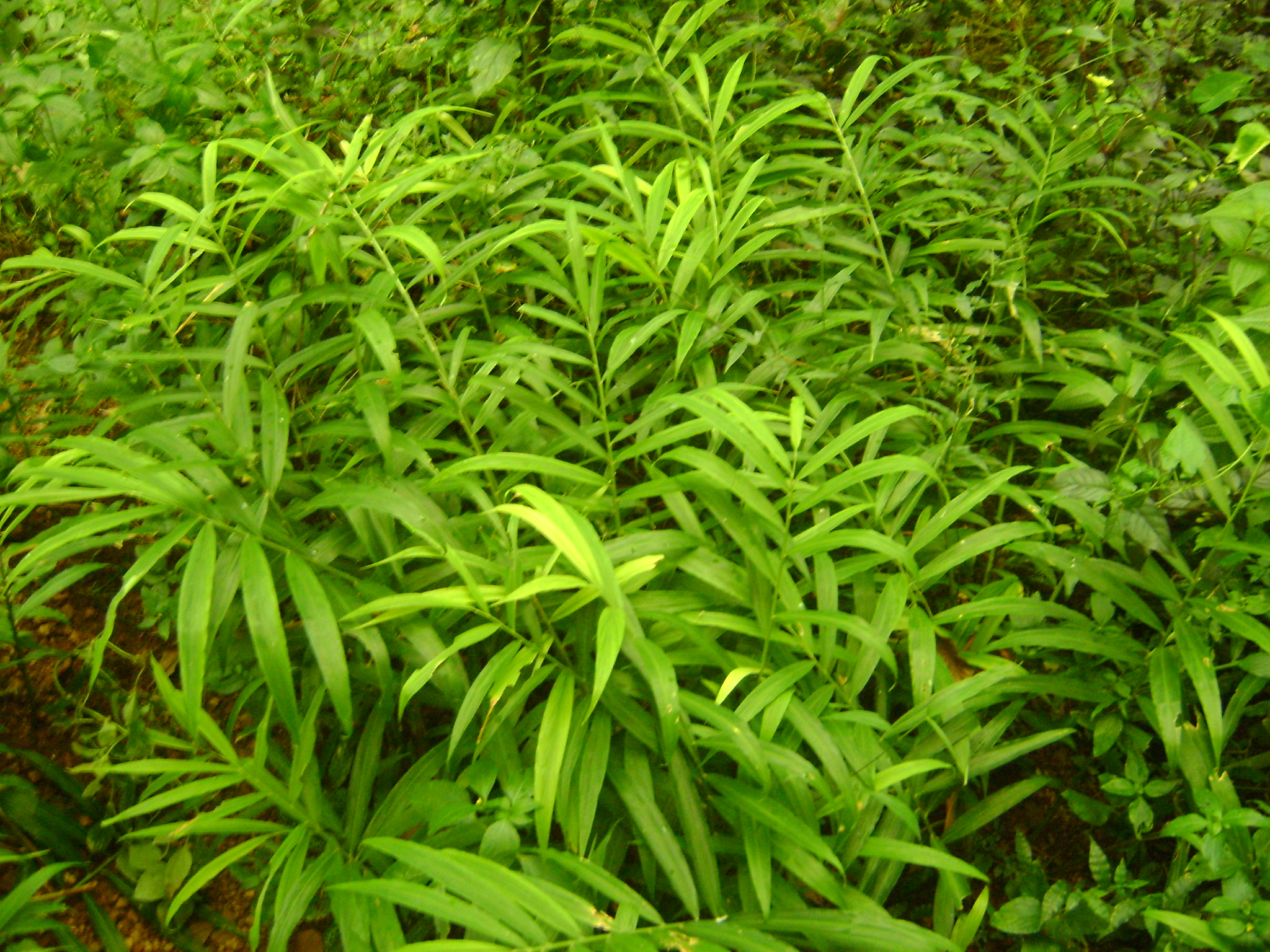
- Diversity of monocots which includes wheat (Triticum), taro (Colocasia esculenta), date palm (Phoenix dactylifera), Zostera marina, lily (Lilium), Pandanus heterocarpus, and ginger (Zingiber officinale)

Scientific classification
- Kingdom: Plantae
- Clade: Tracheophytes
- Clade: Angiosperms
- Clade: Monocots

Type genus
- Lilium L.

Orders
- Alismatid monocots; Acorales; Alismatales; Lilioid monocots; Asparagales; Dioscoreales; Liliales; Pandanales; Petrosaviales; Commelinids; Arecales; Commelinales; Poales; Zingiberales

Synonyms
- Alternifoliae Bessey; Endogenae DC.; Lilianae Takht.; Liliatae Cronquist, Takht. & W.Zimm. (Note: In 1964, Takhtajan proposed that classes including Monocotyledons, be formally named with the suffix -atae, so that the principle of typification resulted in Liliatae for monocotyledons. The proposal was formally described in 1966 by Cronquist, Takhtajan and Zimmermann, from which is derived the descriptor "liliates".); Liliidae Takht. (Note: Tropicos gives an earlier authority, J.H. Schaffn. 1911); Liliopsida Batsch; Monocotyleae Eichler; Monocotyledonae E.Morren ex Mez (Note: Cronquist attributes this term to De Candolle as DC. 1818 Syst. 1: 122); Monocotyledones

= Monocotyledon =

Monocotyledons Temporal range: Early Cretaceous – Recent

Clade of flowering plants

Monocotyledons (/ˌmɒnəˌkɒtəˈliːdənz/), (Note: An Anglo-Latin pronunciation. "monocotyledon". Oxford English Dictionary (online ed.). Oxford University Press. doi:10.1093/OED/6968478296. (Subscription or participating institution membership required.)) commonly referred to as monocots (Lilianae sensu Chase & Reveal), are flowering plants whose seeds contain only one embryonic leaf, or cotyledon. A monocot taxon has been in use for several decades, but with various ranks and under several different names. Monocots are grouped in a clade called the Monocotyledoneae. The APG IV system recognises its monophyly but does not assign it to a taxonomic rank, and instead uses the term "monocots" to refer to the group.

Monocotyledons are contrasted with the dicotyledons, which have two cotyledons. Unlike the monocots however, the dicots are not monophyletic and the two cotyledons are instead the ancestral characteristic of all flowering plants. Botanists now classify dicots into the eudicots ("true dicots") and several basal lineages from which both the eudicots and monocots emerged.

The monocots are extremely important economically, culturally, and ecologically, and make up a majority of plant biomass used in agriculture. Common crops such as dates, onions, garlic, rice, wheat, maize, and sugarcane are all monocots. The grasses alone cover over 40% of Earth's land area (Note: Excluding Antarctica and Greenland.) and contribute a significant portion of the human diet. Orchids, tulips, daffodils, and lilies are among the common houseplants belonging to the monocot group.

== Description ==
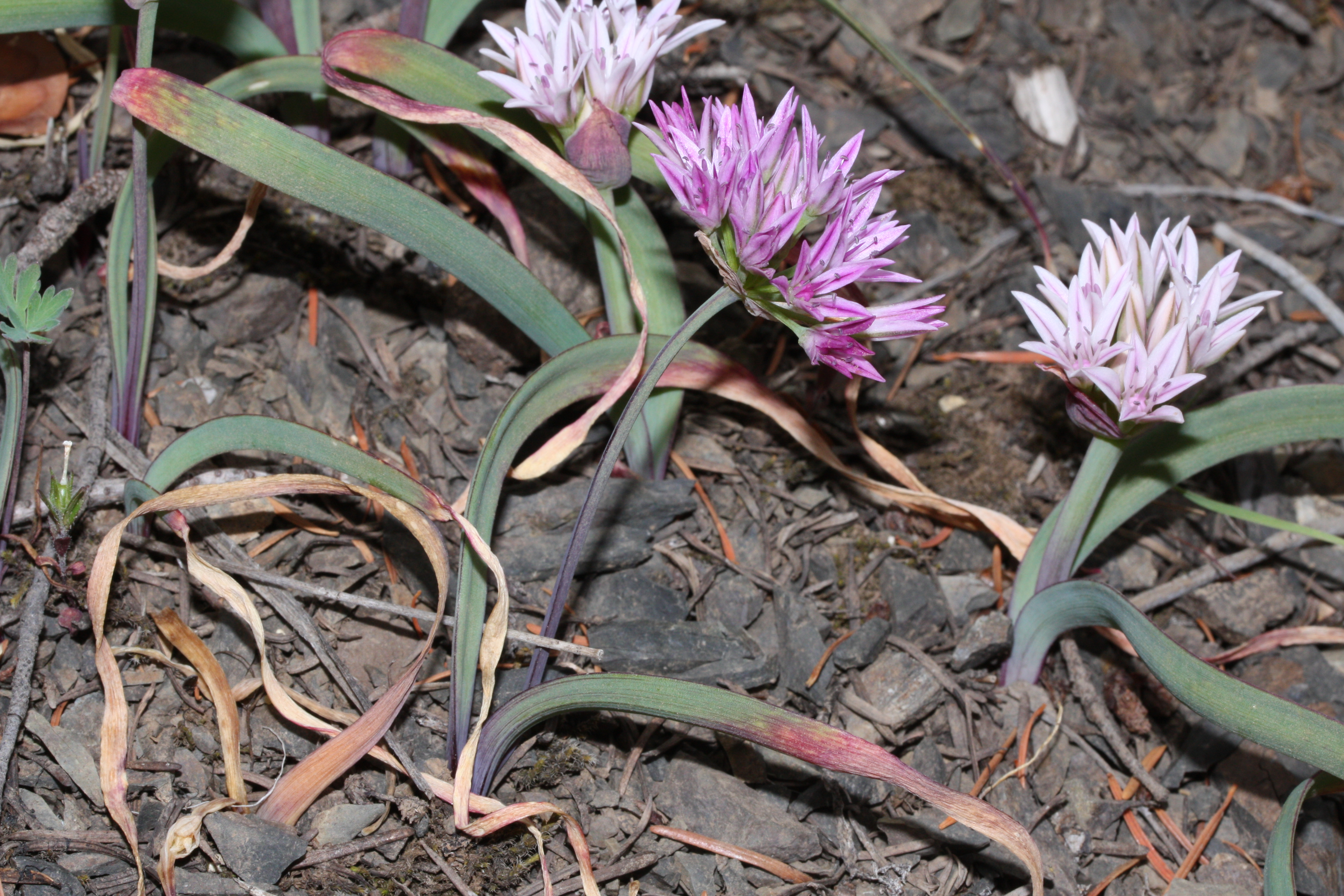
Allium crenulatum (Asparagales), an onion, with typical monocot perianth and parallel leaf venation

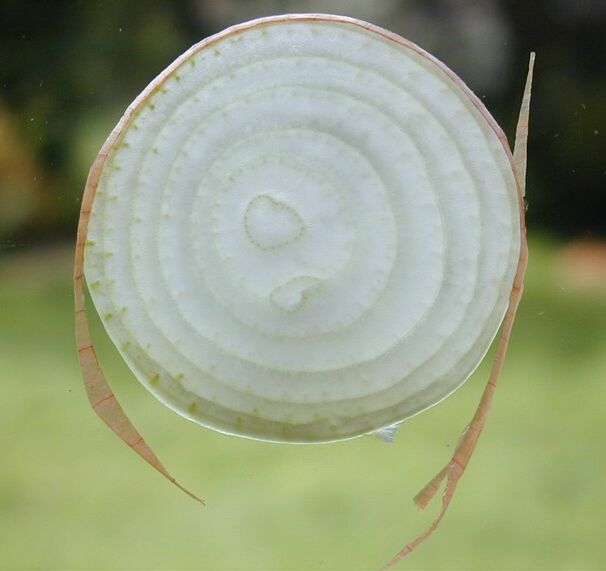
Onion slice: the cross-sectional view shows the veins that run in parallel along the length of the bulb and stem

The monocots have a single cotyledon, or embryonic leaf, in their seeds. Historically, this feature was used to contrast the monocots with the dicotyledons or dicots which typically have two cotyledons; however, modern research has shown that the dicots are paraphyletic. From a diagnostic point of view the number of cotyledons is neither a particularly useful characteristic (as they are only present for a very short period in a plant's life), nor is it completely reliable. The single cotyledon is only one of a number of modifications of the body plan of the ancestral monocotyledons, whose adaptive advantages are poorly understood, but may have been related to adaption to aquatic habitats, prior to radiation to terrestrial habitats. Nevertheless, monocots are sufficiently distinctive that there has rarely been disagreement as to membership of this group, despite considerable diversity in terms of external morphology.

With over 70,000 species, monocots are one of the most evolutionarily successful clades of plants and occupy a diverse set of niches: Perennial geophytes including orchids (Asparagales); tulips and lilies (Liliales); rosette and succulent epiphytes (Asparagales); mycoheterotrophs (Liliales, Dioscoreales, Pandanales), all in the lilioid monocots; major cereal grains (maize, rice, barley, rye, oats, millet, sorghum and wheat) in the grass family; and forage grasses (Poales) as well as woody tree-like palm trees (Arecales), bamboo, reeds and bromeliads (Poales), bananas and ginger (Zingiberales) in the commelinid monocots, as well as floating or submerged aquatic plants such as seagrass (Alismatales) are all monocots.

=== Vegetative ===
==== Organisation, growth and life forms ====
The most conspicuous distinction is their growth pattern, lacking a lateral meristem (cambium) that allows for continual growth in diameter with height (secondary growth), and therefore this characteristic is a basic limitation in shoot construction. Although largely herbaceous, monocots include some arboraceous species that reach great height, length and mass. The latter category includes agaves, palms, pandans, yuccas and bamboos. This creates challenges in water transport that monocots deal with in various ways. Some, such as species of Yucca, develop anomalous secondary growth, while palm trees utilise an anomalous primary growth form described as establishment growth (see Vascular system). The axis undergoes primary thickening, which progresses from internode to internode, resulting in a typical inverted conical shape of the basal primary axis (see Tillich, Figure 1). The limited conductivity also contributes to limited branching of the stems. A wide variety of adaptive growth forms has resulted from these conditions, (Tillich, Figure 2) such as epiphytic orchids (Asparagales) and bromeliads, (Poales) to submarine Alismatales (including the reduced Lemnoideae) and mycotrophic Burmanniaceae (Dioscreales) and Triuridaceae (Pandanales). Other forms of adaptation include the climbing vines of Araceae (Alismatales) which use negative phototropism (skototropism) to locate host trees (i.e. the darkest area), while some palms such as Calamus manan (Arecales) produce the longest shoots in the plant kingdom, up to 185 m long. Other monocots, particularly Poales, have adopted a therophyte life form.

==== Leaves ====
The cotyledon consists of a proximal leaf base or hypophyll and a distal hyperphyll. In monocots the hypophyll tends to be the dominant part in contrast to other angiosperms. From these, considerable diversity arises. Mature monocot leaves are generally narrow and linear, forming a sheathing around the stem at its base, although there are many exceptions.

Leaf venation is of the striate type, mainly arcuate-striate or longitudinally striate (parallel), less often palmate-striate or pinnate-striate with the leaf veins emerging at the leaf base and then running together at the apices.

There is usually only one leaf per node because the leaf base encompasses more than half the circumference. The evolution of this monocot characteristic has been attributed to developmental differences in early zonal differentiation rather than meristem activity (leaf base theory).

==== Roots and underground organs ====
The lack of cambium in the primary root limits its ability to grow sufficiently to maintain the plant. This necessitates early development of roots derived from the shoot (adventitious roots). In addition to roots, monocots develop runners and rhizomes, which are creeping shoots. Runners serve vegetative propagation, have elongated internodes, run on or just below the surface of the soil and in most case bear scale leaves. Rhizomes frequently have an additional storage function and rhizome producing plants are considered geophytes (Tillich, Figure 11). Other geophytes develop bulbs, a short axial body bearing leaves whose bases store food. Additional outer non-storage leaves may form a protective function (Tillich, Figure 12). Other storage organs may be tubers or corms, swollen axes. Tubers may form at the end of underground runners and persist. Corms are short lived vertical shoots with terminal inflorescences and shrivel once flowering has occurred. However, intermediate forms may occur such as in Crocosmia (Asparagales). Some monocots may also produce shoots that grow directly down into the soil, these are geophilous shoots (Tillich, Figure 11) that help overcome the limited trunk stability of large woody monocots.

=== Reproductive ===
==== Flowers ====
In most monocots, the perigone consists of two alternating trimerous whorls of tepals, being homochlamydeous, without differentiation between calyx and corolla. In zoophilous (pollinated by animals) taxa, both whorls are corolline (petal-like). Anthesis (the period of flower opening) is usually fugacious (short lived). Some of the more persistent perigones demonstrate thermonastic opening and closing (responsive to changes in temperature). About two thirds of monocots are zoophilous, predominantly by insects. These plants need to advertise to pollinators and do so by way of phaneranthous (showy) flowers. Such optical signalling is usually a function of the tepal whorls but may also be provided by semaphylls (other structures such as filaments, staminodes or stylodia which have become modified to attract pollinators). However, some monocot plants may have aphananthous (inconspicuous) flowers and still be pollinated by animals. In these the plants rely either on chemical attraction or other structures such as coloured bracts fulfill the role of optical attraction. In some phaneranthous plants such structures may reinforce floral structures. The production of fragrances for olfactory signalling are common in monocots. The perigone also functions as a landing platform for pollinating insects.

==== Fruit and seed ====
The embryo consists of, and will sprout with a single cotyledon, usually with two vascular bundles.

=== Comparison with dicots ===
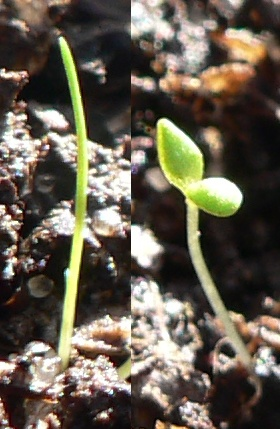
Comparison of a monocot (grass: Poales) sprouting (left) with a dicot (right) (Note: Monocots show hypogeal development in which the cotyledon remains invisible within the seed, underground. The visible part is the first true leaf produced from the meristem)

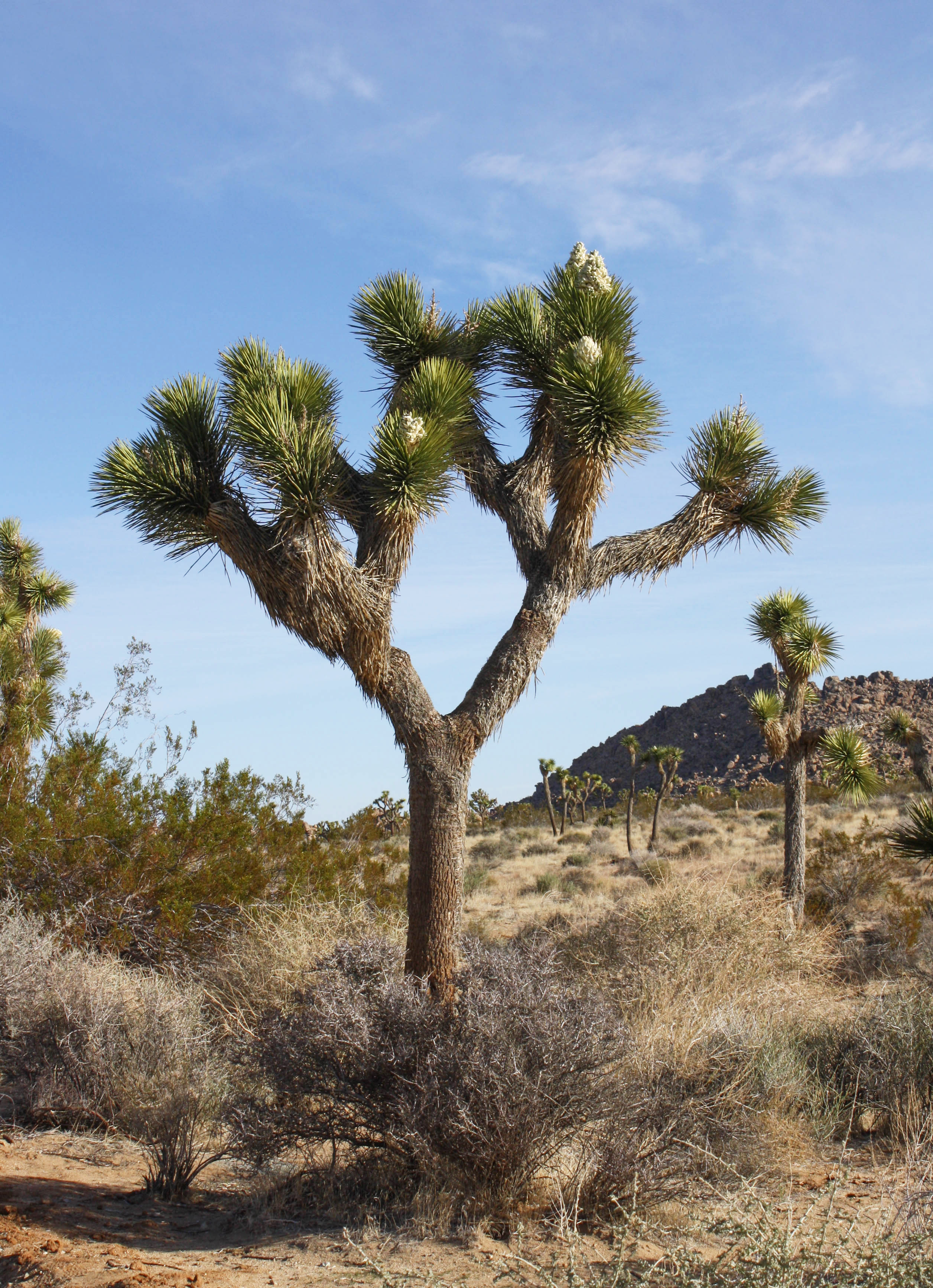
Yucca brevifolia (Joshua Tree: Asparagales)

The traditionally listed differences between monocots and dicots are as follows. This is a broad sketch only, not invariably applicable, as there are a number of exceptions. The differences indicated are more true for monocots versus eudicots.

Feature	In monocots	In dicots
Growth form	Mostly herbaceous, occasionally arboraceous	Herbaceous or arboraceous
Leaves	Leaf shape oblong or linear, often sheathed at base, petiole seldom developed, stipules absent. Major leaf veins usually parallel	Broad, seldom sheathed, petiole common often with stipules. Veins usually reticulate (pinnate or palmate)
Roots	Primary root of short duration, replaced by adventitial roots forming fibrous or fleshy root systems	Develops from the radicle. Primary root often persists forming strong taproot and secondary roots
Plant stem: Vascular bundles	Numerous scattered bundles in ground parenchyma, cambium rarely present, no differentiation between cortical and stelar regions	Ring of primary bundles with cambium, differentiated into cortex and stele (eustelic)
Flowers	Parts in threes (trimerous) or multiples of three (e.g. 3, 6 or 9 petals)	Fours (tetramerous) or fives (pentamerous)
Pollen: Number of apertures (furrows or pores)	Monocolpate (single aperture or colpus)	Tricolpate (three)
Embryo: Number of cotyledons (leaves in the seed)	One, endosperm frequently present in seed	Two, endosperm present or absent

Comparison of monocots and dicots

A number of these differences are not exclusive to the monocots, and, while still useful, no one single feature will infallibly identify a plant as a monocot. For example, trimerous flowers and monosulcate pollen are also found in magnoliids, and exclusively adventitious roots are found in some of the Piperaceae. Similarly, at least one of these traits, parallel leaf veins, is far from universal among the monocots. Broad leaves and reticulate leaf veins, features typical of dicots, are found in a wide variety of monocot families: for example, Trillium, Smilax (greenbriar), Pogonia (an orchid), and the Dioscoreales (yams). Potamogeton and Paris quadrifolia (herb-paris) are examples of monocots with tetramerous flowers. Other plants exhibit a mixture of characteristics. Nymphaeaceae (water lilies) have reticulate veins, a single cotyledon, adventitious roots, and a monocot-like vascular bundle. These examples reflect their shared ancestry. This list of traits is generally valid and helpful for identification, especially when contrasting monocots with eudicots, rather than non-monocot flowering plants in general.

=== Apomorphies ===
Monocot apomorphies (characteristics derived during radiation rather than inherited from an ancestral form) include herbaceous habit, leaves with parallel venation and sheathed base, an embryo with a single cotyledon, an atactostele, numerous adventitious roots, sympodial growth, and trimerous (3 parts per whorl) flowers that are pentacyclic (5 whorled) with 3 sepals, 3 petals, 2 whorls of 3 stamens each, and 3 carpels. In contrast, monosulcate pollen is considered an ancestral trait, probably plesiomorphic.

=== Synapomorphies ===
The distinctive common features of the monocots have contributed to the relative taxonomic stability of the group. Douglas E. Soltis and others identify thirteen synapomorphies (shared characteristics that unite monophyletic groups of taxa);

1. Calcium oxalate raphides
2. Absence of vessels in leaves
3. Monocotyledonous anther wall formation*
4. Successive microsporogenesis
5. Syncarpous gynoecium
6. Parietal placentation
7. Monocotyledonous seedling
8. Persistent radicle
9. Haustorial cotyledon tip
10. Open cotyledon sheath
11. Steroidal saponins*
12. Fly pollination*
13. Diffuse vascular bundles and absence of secondary growth (Note: Lacking in Acorus, so that if this genus is sister to the rest of the monocots, the synapomorphies do not apply to monocots as a whole.)

=== Vascular system ===
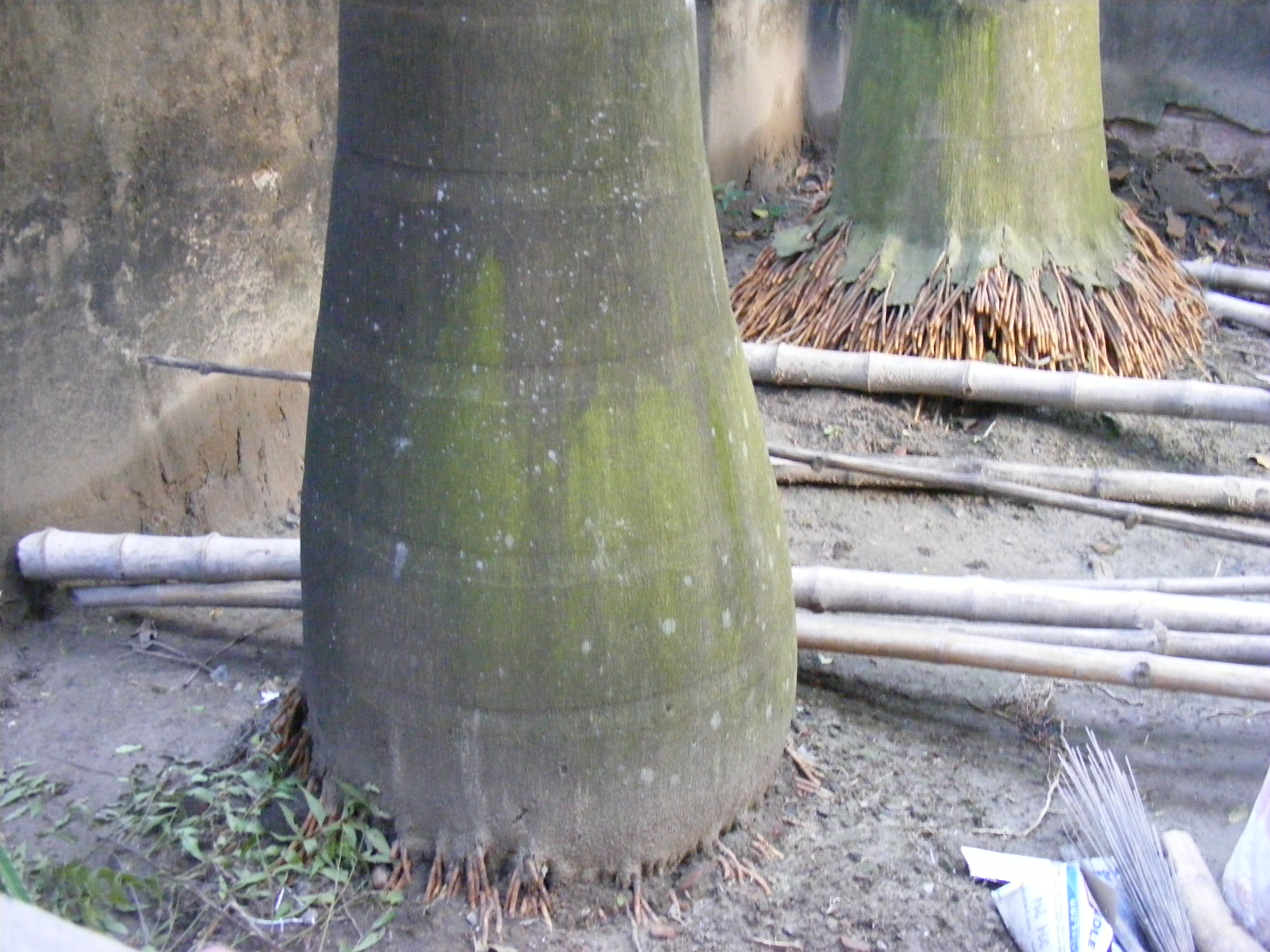
Roystonea regia palm (Arecales) stems showing anomalous secondary growth in monocots, with characteristic fibrous roots

Monocots have a distinctive arrangement of vascular tissue known as an atactostele in which the vascular tissue is scattered rather than arranged in concentric rings. Collenchyma is absent in monocot stems, roots and leaves. Many monocots are herbaceous and do not have the ability to increase the width of a stem (secondary growth) via the same kind of vascular cambium found in non-monocot woody plants. However, some monocots do have secondary growth; because this does not arise from a single vascular cambium producing xylem inwards and phloem outwards, it is termed "anomalous secondary growth". Examples of large monocots which either exhibit secondary growth, or can reach large sizes without it, are palms (Arecaceae), screwpines (Pandanaceae), bananas (Musaceae), Yucca, Aloe, Dracaena, and Cordyline.

== Taxonomy ==
=== Early history ===
==== Pre-Linnean ====
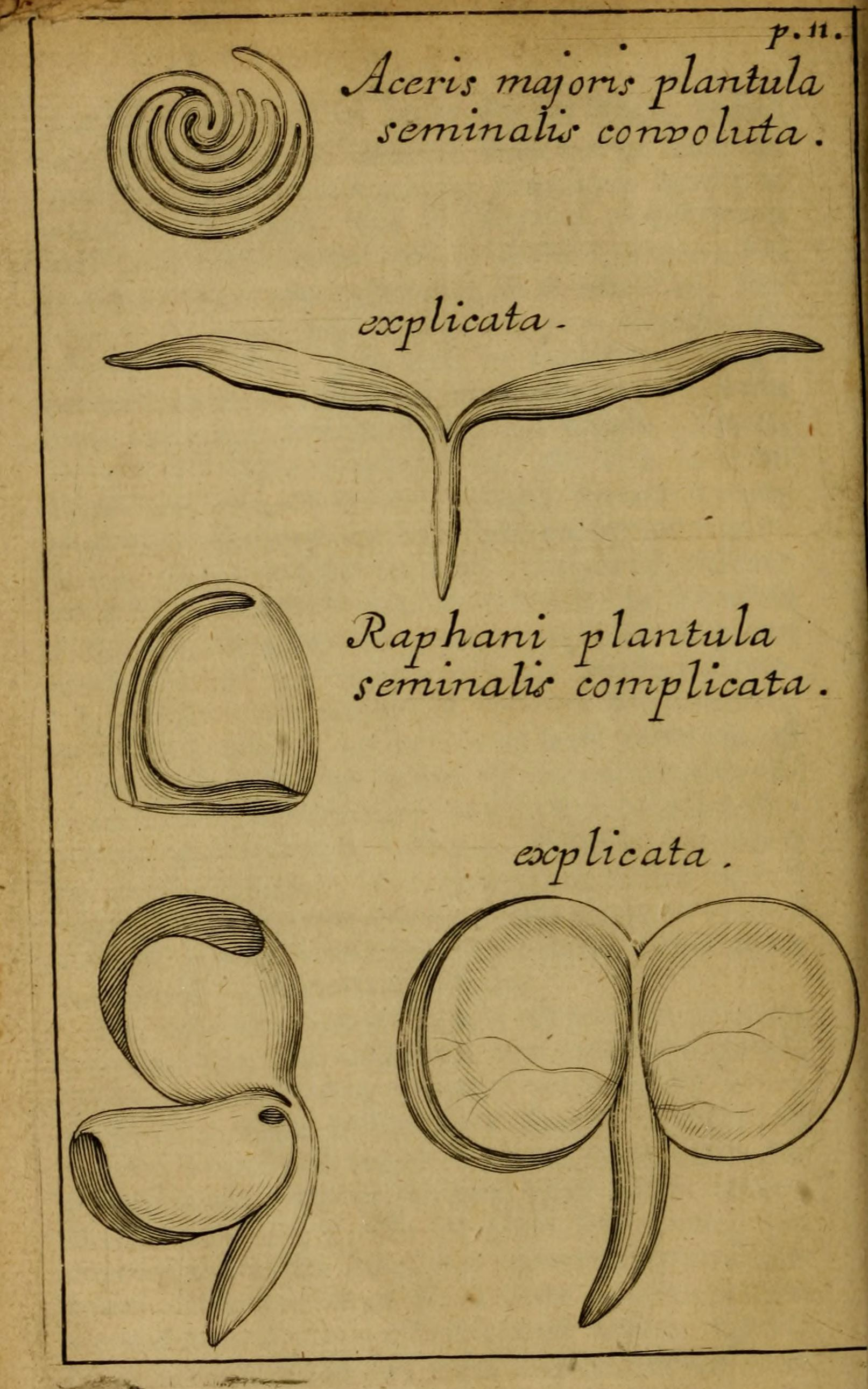
Illustrations of cotyledons by John Ray 1682, after Malpighi

Monocots were first recognized as a group in Matthias de l'Obel's Stirpium adversaria nova. Searching for non-pharmacological characteristics to classify plants by, he chose on leaf form and venation, and observed that the majority of plants had broad leaves with net-like venation, but some had long and straight leaves with parallel veins. He did not decide on any formal name for the two groups he discovered, and his new classification scheme did not receive much appraisal and only saw moderate success within academic circles.

Formal description dates from John Ray's studies of seed structure in the 17th century. Ray, who is often considered the first botanical systematist, observed the dichotomy of cotyledon structure in his examination of seeds. He reported his findings in a paper read to the Royal Society on 17 December 1674, entitled "A Discourse on the Seeds of Plants".

A Discourse on the Seeds of Plants

The greatest number of plants that come of seed spring at first out of the earth with two leaves which being for the most part of a different figure from the succeeding leaves are by our gardeners not improperly called the seed leaves...
In the first kind the seed leaves are nothing but the two lobes of the seed having their plain sides clapt together like the two halves of a walnut and therefore are of the just figure of the seed slit in sunder flat wise...
Of seeds that spring out of the earth with leaves like the succeeding and no seed leaves I have observed two sorts. 1. Such as are congenerous to the first kind precedent that is whose pulp is divided into two lobes and a radicle...
2. Such which neither spring out of the ground with seed leaves nor have their pulp divided into lobes

— John Ray (1674), pp. 164, 166

Since this paper appeared a year before the publication of Malpighi's Anatome Plantarum (1675–1679), Ray has the priority. At the time, Ray did not fully realise the importance of his discovery but progressively developed this over successive publications. And since these were in Latin, "seed leaves" became folia seminalia and then cotyledon, following Malpighi. Malpighi and Ray were familiar with each other's work, and Malpighi in describing the same structures had introduced the term cotyledon, which Ray adopted in his subsequent writing.

De seminum vegetatione

Mense quoque Maii, alias seminales plantulas Fabarum, & Phaseolorum, ablatis pariter binis seminalibus foliis, seu cotyledonibus, incubandas posui
In the month of May, also, I incubated two seed plants, Faba and Phaseolus, after removing the two seed leaves, or cotyledons

— Marcello Malpighi (1679), p. 18

In this experiment, Malpighi also showed that the cotyledons were critical to the development of the plant, proof that Ray required for his theory. In his Methodus plantarum nova Ray also developed and justified the "natural" or pre-evolutionary approach to classification, based on characteristics selected a posteriori in order to group together taxa that have the greatest number of shared characteristics. This approach, also referred to as polythetic would last till evolutionary theory enabled Eichler to develop the phyletic system that superseded it in the late nineteenth century, based on an understanding of the acquisition of characteristics. He also made the crucial observation Ex hac seminum divisione sumum potest generalis plantarum distinctio, eaque meo judicio omnium prima et longe optima, in eas sci. quae plantula seminali sunt bifolia aut διλόβω, et quae plantula sem. adulta analoga. (From this division of the seeds derives a general distinction amongst plants, that in my judgement is first and by far the best, into those seed plants which are bifoliate, or bilobed, and those that are analogous to the adult), that is between monocots and dicots. He illustrated this by quoting from Malpighi and including reproductions of Malpighi's drawings of cotyledons (see figure). Initially Ray did not develop a classification of flowering plants (florifera) based on a division by the number of cotyledons, but developed his ideas over successive publications, coining the terms Monocotyledones and Dicotyledones in 1703, in the revised version of his Methodus (Methodus plantarum emendata), as a primary method for dividing them, Herbae floriferae, dividi possunt, ut diximus, in Monocotyledones & Dicotyledones (Flowering plants, can be divided, as we have said, into Monocotyledons & Dicotyledons).

==== Post Linnean ====
Although Linnaeus (1707–1778) did not utilise Ray's discovery, basing his own classification solely on floral reproductive morphology, the term was used shortly after his classification appeared (1753) by Scopoli and who is credited for its introduction. (Note: Scopoli, in his treatment of Linnaeus' scheme comments in the Hexandria polygynia on the fact that Alisma is a member of the Gens monocotyledon) Every taxonomist since then, starting with De Jussieu and De Candolle, has used Ray's distinction as a major classification characteristic. (Note: See also Lindley's review of classification systems up to 1853, and Dahlgren's from 1853–1982) In De Jussieu's system (1789), he followed Ray, arranging his Monocotyledones into three classes based on stamen position and placing them between Acotyledones and Dicotyledones. De Candolle's system (1813) which was to predominate thinking through much of the 19th century used a similar general arrangement, with two subgroups of his Monocotylédonés (Monocotyledoneae). Lindley (1830) followed De Candolle in using the terms Monocotyledon and Endogenae (Note: Endogènes (ενδον within + γεναω I create)) interchangeably. They considered the monocotyledons to be a group of vascular plants (Vasculares) whose vascular bundles were thought to arise from within (Endogènes or endogenous).

Monocotyledons remained in a similar position as a major division of the flowering plants throughout the nineteenth century, with minor variations. George Bentham and Hooker (1862–1883) used Monocotyledones, as would Wettstein, while August Eichler used Mononocotyleae and Engler, following de Candolle, Monocotyledoneae. In the twentieth century, some authors used alternative names such as Bessey's (1915) Alternifoliae and Cronquist's (1966) Liliatae. Later (1981) Cronquist changed Liliatae to Liliopsida, usages also adopted by Takhtajan simultaneously. Thorne (1992) and Dahlgren (1985) also used Liliidae as a synonym.

Taxonomists had considerable latitude in naming this group, as the Monocotyledons were a group above the rank of family. Article 16 of the ICBN allows either a descriptive botanical name or a name formed from the name of an included family.

In summary they have been variously named, as follows:

- class Monocotyledoneae in the de Candolle system and the Engler system
- class Monocotyledones in the Bentham & Hooker system and the Wettstein system
- class Monocotyleae in the Eichler system
- class Liliatae then Liliopsida in the Takhtajan system and the Cronquist system
- subclass Liliidae in the Dahlgren system and the Thorne system

=== Modern era ===
Over the 1980s, a more general review of the classification of angiosperms was undertaken. The 1990s saw considerable progress in plant phylogenetics and cladistic theory, initially based on rbcL gene sequencing and cladistic analysis, enabling a phylogenetic tree to be constructed for the flowering plants. The establishment of major new clades necessitated a departure from the older but widely used classifications such as Cronquist and Thorne, based largely on morphology rather than genetic data. These developments complicated discussions on plant evolution and necessitated a major taxonomic restructuring.

This DNA based molecular phylogenetic research confirmed on the one hand that the monocots remained as a well defined monophyletic group or clade, in contrast to the other historical divisions of the flowering plants, which had to be substantially reorganized. No longer could the angiosperms be simply divided into monocotyledons and dicotyledons; it was apparent that the monocotyledons were but one of a relatively large number of defined groups within the angiosperms. Correlation with morphological criteria showed that the defining feature was not cotyledon number but the separation of angiosperms into two major pollen types, uniaperturate (monosulcate and monosulcate-derived) and triaperturate (tricolpate and tricolpate-derived), with the monocots situated within the uniaperturate groups. The formal taxonomic ranking of Monoctyledons thus became replaced with monocots as an informal clade. This is the name that has been most commonly used since the publication of the Angiosperm Phylogeny Group (APG) system in 1998 and regularly updated since.

Within the angiosperms, there are two major grades, a small early branching basal grade, the basal angiosperms (ANA grade) with three lineages and a larger late branching grade, the core angiosperms (mesangiosperms) with five lineages, as shown in the cladogram.

Cladogram I: Phylogenetic position of the monocots within the angiosperms in APG IV (2016)

- angiosperms
  - Amborellales
  - - Nymphaeales
    - - Austrobaileyales
      - - - magnoliids
          - Chloranthales
        - - monocots
          - - Ceratophyllales
            - eudicots

=== Subdivision ===
While the monocotyledons have remained extremely stable in their outer borders as a well-defined and coherent monophylectic group, the deeper internal relationships have undergone considerable flux, with many competing classification systems over time.

Historically, Bentham (1877), considered the monocots to consist of four alliances, Epigynae, Coronariae, Nudiflorae and Glumales, based on floral characteristics. He describes the attempts to subdivide the group since the days of Lindley as largely unsuccessful. Like most subsequent classification systems it failed to distinguish between two major orders, Liliales and Asparagales, now recognised as quite separate. A major advance in this respect was the work of Rolf Dahlgren (1980), which would form the basis of the Angiosperm Phylogeny Group's (APG) subsequent modern classification of monocot families. Dahlgren who used the alternate name Lilliidae considered the monocots as a subclass of angiosperms characterised by a single cotyledon and the presence of triangular protein bodies in the sieve tube plastids. He divided the monocots into seven superorders, Alismatiflorae, Ariflorae, Triuridiflorae, Liliiflorae, Zingiberiflorae, Commeliniflorae and Areciflorae. With respect to the specific issue regarding Liliales and Asparagales, Dahlgren followed Huber (1969) in adopting a splitter approach, in contrast to the longstanding tendency to view Liliaceae as a very broad sensu lato family. Following Dahlgren's untimely death in 1987, his work was continued by his widow, Gertrud Dahlgren, who published a revised version of the classification in 1989. In this scheme the suffix -florae was replaced with -anae (e.g. Alismatanae) and the number of superorders expanded to ten with the addition of Bromelianae, Cyclanthanae and Pandananae.

Molecular studies have both confirmed the monophyly of the monocots and helped elucidate relationships within this group. The APG system does not assign the monocots to a taxonomic rank, instead recognizing a monocots clade. However, there has remained some uncertainty regarding the exact relationships between the major lineages, with a number of competing models (including APG).

The APG system establishes eleven orders of monocots. These form three grades, the alismatid monocots, lilioid monocots and the commelinid monocots by order of branching, from early to late. In the following cladogram numbers indicate crown group (most recent common ancestor of the sampled species of the clade of interest) divergence times in mya (million years ago).

Cladogram 2: The phylogenetic composition of the monocots

- monocots (131 MYA)
  - - - Acorales
      - - Alismatales
        - 122 MYA
          - Petrosaviales
          - - 120 MYA
              - Dioscoreales (115 MYA)
              - Pandanales (91 MYA)
            - - Liliales (121 MYA)
              - 121 MYA
                - Asparagales (120 MYA)
                - commelinids (118 MYA)
                  - Arecales
                  - - Poales
                    - - Zingiberales
                      - Commelinales

Of some 70,000 species, by far the largest number (65%) are found in two families, the orchids and grasses. The orchids (Orchidaceae, Asparagales) contain about 25,000 species and the grasses (Poaceae, Poales) about 11,000. Other well known groups within the Poales order include the Cyperaceae (sedges) and Juncaceae (rushes), and the monocots also include familiar families such as the palms (Arecaceae, Arecales) and lilies (Liliaceae, Liliales).

=== Evolution ===
In prephyletic classification systems monocots were generally positioned between plants other than angiosperms and dicots, implying that monocots were more primitive. With the introduction of phyletic thinking in taxonomy (from the system of Eichler 1875–1878 onwards) the predominant theory of monocot origins was the ranalean (ranalian) theory, particularly in the work of Bessey (1915), which traced the origin of all flowering plants to a Ranalean type, and reversed the sequence making dicots the more primitive group.

The monocots form a monophyletic group arising early in the history of the flowering plants, but the fossil record is meagre. The earliest fossils presumed to be monocot remains date from the early Cretaceous period. For a very long time, fossils of palm trees were believed to be the oldest monocots, first appearing 90 million years ago (mya), but this estimate may not be entirely true. At least some putative monocot fossils have been found in strata as old as the eudicots. The oldest fossils that are unequivocally monocots are pollen from the Late Barremian–Aptian – Early Cretaceous period, about 120-110 million years ago, and are assignable to clade-Pothoideae-Monstereae Araceae; being Araceae, sister to other Alismatales. They have also found flower fossils of Triuridaceae (Pandanales) in Upper Cretaceous rocks in New Jersey, becoming the oldest known sighting of saprophytic/mycotrophic habits in angiosperm plants and among the oldest known fossils of monocotyledons.

Topology of the angiosperm phylogenetic tree could imply that the monocots are among the oldest lineages of angiosperms, which would support the theory that they are just as old as the eudicots. The pollen of the eudicots dates back 125 million years, so the lineage of monocots should be that old too.

==== Molecular clock estimates ====
Kåre Bremer, using rbcL sequences and the mean path length method for estimating divergence times, estimated the age of the monocot crown group (i.e. the time at which the ancestor of today's Acorus diverged from the rest of the group) as 134 million years. Similarly, Wikström et al., using Sanderson's non-parametric rate smoothing approach, obtained ages of 127–141 million years for the crown group of monocots. All these estimates have large error ranges (usually 15–20%), and Wikström et al. used only a single calibration point, namely the split between Fagales and Cucurbitales, which was set to 84 Ma, in the late Santonian period. Early molecular clock studies using strict clock models had estimated the monocot crown age to 200 ± 20 million years ago or 160 ± 16 million years, while studies using relaxed clocks have obtained 135-131 million years or 133.8 to 124 million years. Bremer's estimate of 134 million years has been used as a secondary calibration point in other analyses. Some estimates place the diversification of the monocots as far back as 150 mya in the Jurassic period.

The lineage that led to monocots (stem group) split from other plants about 136 million years ago or 165–170 million years ago.

==== Core group ====
The age of the core group of so-called 'nuclear monocots' or 'core monocots', which correspond to all orders except Acorales and Alismatales, is about 131 million years to present, and crown group age is about 126 million years to the present. The subsequent branching in this part of the tree (i.e. Petrosaviaceae, Dioscoreales + Pandanales and Liliales clades appeared), including the crown Petrosaviaceae group may be in the period around 125–120 million years BC (about 111 million years so far), and stem groups of all other orders, including Commelinidae would have diverged about or shortly after 115 million years. These and many clades within these orders may have originated in southern Gondwana, i.e. Antarctica, Australasia, and southern South America.

==== Aquatic monocots ====
The aquatic monocots of Alismatales have been regarded as "primitive". They have also been considered to have the most primitive foliage, which were cross-linked as Dioscoreales and Melanthiales. Keep in mind that the "most primitive" monocot is not necessarily "the sister of everyone else". This is because the ancestral or primitive characters are inferred by means of the reconstruction of character states, with the help of the phylogenetic tree. So primitive characters of monocots may be present in some derived groups. On the other hand, the basal taxa may exhibit many morphological autapomorphies. So although Acoraceae is the sister group to the remaining monocotyledons, the result does not imply that Acoraceae is "the most primitive monocot" in terms of its character states. In fact, Acoraceae is highly derived in many morphological characters, and that is precisely why Acoraceae and Alismatales occupied relatively derived positions in the trees produced by Chase et al. and others.

Some authors support the idea of an aquatic phase as the origin of monocots. The phylogenetic position of Alismatales (many water), which occupy a relationship with the rest except the Acoraceae, do not rule out the idea, because it could be 'the most primitive monocots' but not 'the most basal'. The Atactostele stem, the long and linear leaves, the absence of secondary growth (see the biomechanics of living in the water), roots in groups instead of a single root branching (related to the nature of the substrate), including sympodial use, are consistent with a water source. However, while monocots were sisters of the aquatic Ceratophyllales, or their origin is related to the adoption of some form of aquatic habit, it would not help much to the understanding of how it evolved to develop their distinctive anatomical features: the monocots seem so different from the rest of angiosperms and it is difficult to relate their morphology, anatomy and development and those of broad-leaved angiosperms.

==== Other taxa ====
In the past, taxa which had petiolate leaves with reticulate venation were considered "primitive" within the monocots, because of the superficial resemblance to the leaves of dicotyledons. Recent work suggests that while these taxa are sparse in the phylogenetic tree of monocots, such as fleshy fruited taxa (excluding taxa with aril seeds dispersed by ants), the two features would be adapted to conditions that evolved together regardless. Among the taxa involved were Smilax, Trillium (Liliales), Dioscorea (Dioscoreales), etc. A number of these plants are vines that tend to live in shaded habitats for at least part of their lives, and this fact may also relate to their shapeless stomata. Reticulate venation seems to have appeared at least 26 times in monocots, and fleshy fruits have appeared 21 times (sometimes lost later); the two characteristics, though different, showed strong signs of a tendency to be good or bad in tandem, a phenomenon described as "concerted convergence" ("coordinated convergence").

=== Etymology ===
The name monocotyledons is derived from the traditional botanical name "Monocotyledones" or Monocotyledoneae in Latin, which refers to the fact that most members of this group have one cotyledon, or embryonic leaf, in their seeds.

== Ecology ==
=== Emergence ===
Some monocots, such as grasses, have hypogeal emergence, where the mesocotyl elongates and pushes the coleoptile (which encloses and protects the shoot tip) toward the soil surface. Since elongation occurs above the cotyledon, it is left in place in the soil where it was planted. Many dicots have epigeal emergence, in which the hypocotyl elongates and becomes arched in the soil. As the hypocotyl continues to elongate, it pulls the cotyledons upward, above the soil surface.

== Conservation ==
The IUCN Red List describes four species as extinct, four as extinct in the wild, 626 as possibly extinct, 423 as critically endangered, 632 endangered, 621 vulnerable, and 269 near threatened of 4,492 whose status is known.

== Uses ==
Monocots are among the most important plants economically and culturally, and account for most of the staple foods of the world, such as cereal grains and starchy root crops, and palms, orchids and lilies, building materials, and many medicines. Of the monocots, the grasses are of enormous economic importance as a source of animal and human food, and form the largest component of agricultural species in terms of biomass produced.

Other economically important monocotyledon crops include various palms (Arecaceae), bananas and plantains (Musaceae), gingers and their relatives, turmeric and cardamom (Zingiberaceae), asparagus (Asparagaceae), pineapple (Bromeliaceae), sedges (Cyperaceae) and rushes (Juncaceae), vanilla (Orchidaceae), yam (Dioscoreaceae), taro (Araceae), and leeks, onion and garlic (Amaryllidaceae). Many houseplants are monocotyledon epiphytes. Most of the horticultural bulbs, plants cultivated for their blooms, such as lilies, daffodils, irises, amaryllis, cannas, bluebells and tulips, are monocotyledons.

== See also ==
- Monocotyledon reproduction

== Bibliography ==
=== Books ===
==== Historical ====
- Batsch, August Johann Georg Karl (1802). Tabula affinitatum regni vegetabilis, quam delineavit, et nunc ulterius adumbratam tradit A.J.G.C. Batsch ... (in Latin). Weimar: Landes-Industrie-Comptoir.
- Bentham, G.; Hooker, J.D. (1862–1883). Genera plantarum ad exemplaria imprimis in herbariis kewensibus servata definita (in Latin). London: L Reeve & Co.
- Birch, Thomas, ed. (1757). The History of the Royal Society of London for Improving of Natural Knowledge from Its First Rise, in which the Most Considerable of Those Papers Communicated to the Society, which Have Hitherto Not Been Published, are Inserted as a Supplement to the Philosophical Transactions, Volume 3. London: Millar.
- de Candolle, Augustin Pyramus (1818–1821). Regni vegetabilis systema naturale, sive Ordines, genera et species plantarum secundum methodi naturalis normas digestarum et descriptarum 2 vols. Paris: Treuttel et Würtz.
- de Candolle, AP (1819) [1813]. Théorie élémentaire de la botanique, ou exposition des principes de la classification naturelle et de l'art de décrire et d'etudier les végétaux (2nd ed.).
- Eichler, August W. (1886) [1876]. Syllabus der Vorlesungen über specielle und medicinisch-pharmaceutische Botanik (4th ed.). Berlin: Borntraeger.
- Engler, Adolf (1886). Führer durch den Königlich botanischen Garten der Universität zu Breslau (in German). J.U. Kerns Verlag (Max Müller).
- Jussieu, Antoine Laurent de (1789). Genera Plantarum, secundum ordines naturales disposita juxta methodum in Horto Regio Parisiensi exaratam. Paris. OCLC 5161409.
- Lindley, John (1830). An introduction to the natural system of botany: or, A systematic view of the organisation, natural affinities, and geographical distribution, of the whole vegetable kingdom: together with the uses of the most important species in medicine, the arts, and rural or domestic economy (1st ed.). London: Longman.
- Lindley, John (1853) [1846]. The Vegetable Kingdom: or, The structure, classification, and uses of plants, illustrated upon the natural system (3rd. ed.). London: Bradbury & Evans.
- l'Obel, Matthias de (1571). Stirpium adversaria nova [A new notebook of plants]. London: Thomae Purfoetii.
- Malpighi, Marcello (1675). Anatome plantarum: Cui subjungitur appendix, iteratas & auctas ejusdem authoris de ovo incubato observationes continens (in Latin). London: Johannis Martyn.
- Malpighi, Marcello (1679). Anatome plantarum: Pars altera (in Latin). London: Johannis Martyn.
- Ray, John (1682). Methodus plantarum nova: brevitatis & perspicuitatis causa synoptice in tabulis exhibita, cum notis generum tum summorum tum subalternorum characteristicis, observationibus nonnullis de seminibus plantarum & indice copioso (in Latin). London: Faithorne & Kersey.
- Ray, John (1696). De Variis Plantarum Methodis Dissertatio Brevis (in Latin). London: Smith & Walford.
- Ray, John (1703). Methodus plantarum emendata et aucta: In quãa notae maxime characteristicae exhibentur, quibus stirpium genera tum summa, tum infima cognoscuntur & áa se mutuo dignoscuntur, non necessariis omissis. Accedit methodus graminum, juncorum et cyperorum specialis (in Latin). London: Smith & Walford.
- Sachs, Julius von (1875). Geschichte der Botanik vom 16. Jahrhundert bis 1860 (in German). Munich: Oldenbourg.
  - Sachs, Julius von (1890) [1875]. Geschichte der Botanik vom 16. Jahrhundert bis 1860 [History of botany (1530–1860)]. translated by Henry E. F. Garnsey, revised by Isaac Bayley Balfour. Oxford: Oxford University Press. doi:10.5962/bhl.title.30585., see also History of botany (1530-1860) at Google Books
- Scopoli, Giovanni Antonio (1772). Flora Carniolica exhibens plantas Carnioliae indigenas et distributas in classes, genera, species, varietates, ordine Linnaeano. Vindobonensis (Vienna): Ioannis Pauli Krauss.

==== Modern ====
- Arber, Agnes (1925). Monocotyledons: a morphological study. Cambridge: Cambridge University Press.
- Bell, Adrian D. (2008) [1991]. Plant Form. An illustrated guide to flowering plant morphology. Oxford University Press. ISBN 9780881928501.
  - 1st edition ISBN 9780198542193
- Bewley, J.Derek; Black, Michael; Halmer, Peter, eds. (2006). The encyclopedia of seeds: science, technology and uses. Wallingford: CABI. ISBN 978-0-85199-723-0.
- Crane, Peter R.; Blackmore, Stephen, eds. (1989). Evolution, Systematics, and Fossil History of Hamamelidae. vol. I. Oxford: Clarendon Press. ISBN 978-0-19-857711-9.
- Cronk, Quentin C.B.; Bateman, Richard M.; Hawkins, Julie A., eds. (2002). Developmental genetics and plant evolution. London: Taylor & Francis. ISBN 9781420024982.
- Cronquist, Arthur (1981). An integrated system of classification of flowering plants. New York: Columbia University Press. ISBN 978-0-231-03880-5.
- Cronquist, Arthur (1988) [1968]. The evolution and classification of flowering plants (2nd ed.). Bronx, N.Y., US: New York Botanical Garden. ISBN 9780893273323.
- Dahlgren, Rolf; Clifford, H. T. (1982). The monocotyledons: A comparative study. London and New York: Academic Press. ISBN 9780122006807.
- Dahlgren, R.M.; Clifford, H.T.; Yeo, P.F. (1985). The families of the monocotyledons. Berlin: Springer-Verlag. ISBN 978-3-642-64903-5.
- Datta, Subhash Chandra (1988). Systematic Botany (4 ed.). New Delhi: New Age Intl. ISBN 81-224-0013-2.
- Fernholm, Bo; Bremer, Kåre; Jörnvall, Hans, eds. (1989). The hierarchy of life: molecules and morphology in phylogenetic analysis: proceedings from Nobel symposium 70 held at Alfred Nobel's Björkborn, Karlskoga, Sweden, August 29 – September 2, 1988. Amsterdam: Excerpta Medica. ISBN 9780444810731.
- Hedges, S. Blair; Kumar, Sudhir, eds. (2009), The timetree of life, Oxford: Oxford University Press, ISBN 9780191560156
- Hoeniger, F. David; Hoeniger, J. F. M. (1969). The Development of Natural History in Tudor England. MIT Press. ISBN 978-0-918016-29-4.
- Hutchinson, John (1973). The families of flowering plants, arranged according to a new system based on their probable phylogeny. 2 vols (3rd ed.). Oxford: Oxford University Press. ISBN 9783874291606.
- Kubitzki, Klaus; Huber, Herbert, eds. (1998). Flowering Plants. Monocotyledons: Lilianae (Except Orchidaceae). The Families and Genera of Vascular Plants. Vol. 3. Berlin, Germany: Springer-Verlag. ISBN 3-540-64060-6.
- Kubitzki, Klaus, ed. (1998). Flowering Plants · Monocotyledons. The Families and Genera of Vascular Plants. Vol. 4. Berlin: Springer Berlin Heidelberg. doi:10.1007/978-3-662-03531-3. ISBN 978-3-662-03531-3. S2CID 39472817.
- Leck, Mary Allessio; Parker, V. Thomas; Simpson, Robert L., eds. (2008). Seedling ecology and evolution. Cambridge: Cambridge University Press. ISBN 9780521873055.
- Lersten, Nels R. (2004). Flowering plant embryology with emphasis on economic species. Ames, Iowa: Blackwell Pub. ISBN 9780470752678.
- Mauseth, James D. (2017) [1991]. Botany: An Introduction to Plant Biology (6th ed.). Sudbury, MA: Jones & Bartlett. ISBN 9781284077537.
- Oliver, Francis W., ed. (1913). Makers of British Botany. Cambridge: Cambridge University Press.
- Pavord, Anna (2005). The naming of names the search for order in the world of plants. New York: Bloomsbury. ISBN 9781596919655. See also ebook 2010
- Raven, Peter H.; Evert, Ray F.; Eichhorn, Susan E. (2013). Biology of plants (8th ed.). New York: W.H. Freeman. ISBN 9781464113512.
- Radosevich, Steven R.; Holt, Jodie S.; Ghersa, Claudio (1997). Weed ecology: implications for management (2nd ed.). New York: J. Wiley. ISBN 0-471-11606-8.
- Raven, Charles E. (1950) [1942]. John Ray, naturalist: his life and works (2nd ed.). Cambridge [England]: Cambridge University Press. ISBN 9780521310833.
- Reed, Barbara, ed. (2008). Plant cryopreservation a practical guide. New York: Springer. ISBN 978-0-387-72276-4.
- Short, Emma; George, Alex (2013). A primer of botanical Latin with vocabulary. New York: Cambridge University Press. ISBN 9781107693753.
- Smith, Alison M; et al. (2010). Plant biology. New York, NY: Garland Science. ISBN 9780815340256.
- Stace, Clive A. (1989) [1980]. Plant taxonomy and biosystematics (2nd. ed.). Cambridge: Cambridge University Press. ISBN 978-0-521-42785-2.
- Stebbins, G. Ledyard (1974). Flowering plants: evolution above the species level. Cambridge, Mass.: Harvard University Press. ISBN 0-674-30685-6.
- Stuessy, Tod F. (2009). Plant Taxonomy: The Systematic Evaluation of Comparative Data. Columbia University Press. ISBN 978-0-231-14712-5.
- Soltis, D.E.; Soltis, P.S.; Endress, P.K.; Chase, M.W. (2005). Phylogeny and evolution of angiosperms. Sunderland, MA: Sinauer. ISBN 9781588342010. (see also: Excerpts at Amazon
- Takhtajan, Armen Leonovich (1966). "Lilianae". Система и филогения цветкорых растений (Sistema i filogeniia tsvetkovykh rastenii) [Systema et Phylogemia Magnoliophytorum] (in Russian). trans. C Jeffrey, as Flowering plants: Origin and dispersal, Edinburgh: Oliver and Boyd, 1969. Moscow: Наука. p. 473. ISBN 0-05-001715-2.
- Takhtajan, Armen (1991). Evolutionary trends in flowering plants. New York: Columbia University Press. ISBN 9780231073288.
- Takhtajan, Armen Leonovich (2009). Flowering Plants. Springer. ISBN 978-1-4020-9609-9.
- Wettstein, Richard (1924). Handbuch der Systematischen Botanik 2 vols (3rd ed.). Archived from the original on 18 February 2015.

=== Symposia ===
- Columbus, J. T.; Friar, E. A.; Porter, J. M.; Prince, L. M.; Simpson, M. G., eds. (2006). "Symposium issue: Monocots: comparative biology and evolution (excluding Poales). Proceedings of the Third International Conference on the Comparative Biology of the Monocotyledons, 31 Mar–4 Apr 2003". Aliso. 22 (1). Claremont, Ca.: Rancho Santa Ana Botanic Garden. ISSN 0065-6275.
- Rudall, P.J.; Cribb, P.J.; Cutler, D.F.; Humphries, C.J., eds. (1995). Monocotyledons: systematics and evolution (Proceedings of the International Symposium on Monocotyledons: Systematics and Evolution, Kew 1993). Kew: Royal Botanic Gardens. ISBN 978-0-947643-85-0.
- Wilkin, Paul; Mayo, Simon J, eds. (2013). Early events in monocot evolution. Cambridge: Cambridge University Press. ISBN 978-1-107-01276-9.
- Wilson, K. L.; Morrison, D. A., eds. (2000), Monocots: Systematics and evolution (Proceedings of the Second International Conference on the Comparative Biology of the Monocotyledons, Sydney, Australia 1998), Collingwood, Australia: CSIRO, ISBN 0-643-06437-0 Excerpts
- Seberg, Ole; Petersen, Gitte; Barfod, Anders; Davis, Jerrold I., eds. (2010). Diversity, phylogeny, and evolution in the Monocotyledons: proceedings of the Fourth International Conference on the Comparative Biology of the Monocotyledons and the Fifth International Symposium on Grass Systematics and Evolution. Århus: Aarhus University Press. ISBN 978-87-7934-398-6.
- Tomlinson, P. B.; Zimmerman, Martin, eds. (1978). Tropical Trees as Living Systems (Proceedings of the fourth Cabot Symposium held at Harvard Forest, Petersham Massachusetts on April 26–30, 1976). Cambridge University Press. ISBN 978-0-521-14247-2.

=== Chapters ===
- Anderson, CL; Janssen, T (2009-04-23). Monocots. OUP Oxford. pp. 203–212. ISBN 9780191560156., in Hedges & Kumar (2009)
- Chase, M. W.; Duvall, M. R.; Hills, H. G.; Conran, J. G.; Cox, A. V.; Eguiarte, L. E.; Hartwell, J.; Fay, M. F.; Caddick, L. R.; Cameron, K. M.; Hoot, S. Molecular phylogenetics of Lilianae. pp. 109–137., In Rudall et al. (1995).
- Chase, M.W.; Soltis, D. E.; Soltis, P. S.; Rudall, P. J.; Fay, M. F.; Hahn, W. H.; Sullivan, S.; Joseph, J.; Molvray, M.; Kores, P. J.; Givnish, T. J.; Sytsma, K. J.; Pires, J. C. Higher-level systematics of the monocotyledons: An assessment of current knowledge and a new classification. pp. 3–16., in Wilson & Morrison (2000)
- Chase, M. W.; Stevenson, D. W.; Wilkin, P.; Rudall, P. J. Monocot systematics: A combined analysis. Vol. 2. pp. 685–730., In Rudall et al. (1995)
- Davis, Jerrold I.; Mcneal, Joel R.; Barrett, Craig F.; Chase, Mark W.; Cohen, James I.; Duvall, Melvin R.; Givnish, Thomas J.; Graham, Sean W.; Petersen, Gitte; Pires, J. Chris; Seberg, Ole; Stevenson, Dennis W.; Leebens-Mack, Jim (2013), "Contrasting patterns of support among plastid genes and genomes for major clades of the monocotyledons", Early Events in Monocot Evolution, pp. 315–349, doi:10.1017/CBO9781139002950.015, ISBN 9781139002950, in Wilkin & Mayo (2013)
- Donoghue, Michael J.; Doyle, James A. (1989). Phylogenetic studies of seed plants and angiosperms based on morphological characters (PDF). pp. 181–193. Archived from the original on August 27, 2008., in Fernholm, Bremer & Jörnvall (1989)
- Donoghue, Michael J.; Doyle, James A. (1989). Phylogenetic analysis of angiosperms and the relationships of Hamamelidae (PDF). pp. 17–45., In Crane & Blackmore (1989)
- Dransfield, John (2010-06-10). Growth forms of rain forest palms. Cambridge University Press. pp. 247–268. ISBN 9780521142472., in Tomlinson & Zimmerman (1978)
- Givnish, T.J.; Pires, J.C.; Graham, S.W.; McPherson, M.A.; Prince, L.M.; Patterson, T.B.; Rai, H.S.; Roalson, E.R.; Evans, T.M.; Hahn, W.J; Millam, K.C.; Meerow, A.W.; Molvray, M.; Kores, P.; O'Brien, H.E.; Kress, W.J.; Hall, J.; Sytsma, K.J. Phylogeny of the monocotyledons based on the highly informative plastid gene ndhF: evidence for widespread concerted convergence (PDF). pp. 28–51. Archived from the original (PDF) on 16 January 2014. In Columbus et al. (2006)
- Herendeen, P. S.; Crane, P. R. (1995). The fossil history of the monocotyledons. pp. 1–21. In Rudall et al. (1995)
- Kubitzki, K; Rudall, PJ; Chase, MW (1998). Systematics and evolution. Springer. pp. 23–33. ISBN 9783662035337., In Kubitzki & Huber (1998).
- Panis, Bart (2008). "Cryopreservation of monocots". Plant Cryopreservation: A Practical Guide. pp. 241–280. doi:10.1007/978-0-387-72276-4_11. ISBN 978-0-387-72275-7., in Reed (2008)
- Ray, John (1674). A discourse on the seeds of plants. pp. 162–169., in Birch (1757)
- Rudall, Paula J.; Buzgo, Matyas (2002). "Evolutionary history of the monocot leaf". Developmental Genetics and Plant Evolution. Systematics Association Special Volumes. Vol. 20020544. pp. 431–458. doi:10.1201/9781420024982.ch23 (inactive 10 July 2025). ISBN 978-0-415-25790-9., in Cronk, Bateman & Hawkins (2002)
- Stevenson, D.W.; Loconte, H. Cladistic analysis of monocot families. pp. 543–578. in Rudall et al. (1995)
- Tillich, H.-J. (2013-06-29). Development and Organization. Springer. pp. 1–19. ISBN 9783662035337., In Kubitzki & Huber (1998)
- Tomlinson, P. B. (1995). Non-homology of vascular organisation in monocotyledons and dicotyledons. pp. 589–622. In Rudall et al. (1995)
- Vines, Sydney Howard. Robert Morison 1620–1683 and John Ray 1627–1705. pp. 8–43., in Oliver (1913)
- Vogel, S (1998). Floral biology. Springer. pp. 34–48. ISBN 9783662035337., In Kubitzki & Huber (1998).

=== Articles ===
- Bentham, George (February 1877). "On the Distribution of the Monocotyledonous Orders into Primary Groups, more especially in reference to the Australian Flora, with notes on some points of Terminology". Journal of the Linnean Society of London, Botany. 15 (88): 490–520. doi:10.1111/j.1095-8339.1877.tb00261.x.
- Bessey, Charles E. (1915). "The phylogenetic taxonomy of flowering plants". Annals of the Missouri Botanical Garden. 2 (1/2): 109–164. Bibcode:1915AnMBG...2..109B. doi:10.2307/2990030. JSTOR 2990030. (also at "Botanicus.org". Missouri Botanical Garden.)
- Bremer, K. (2000). "Early Cretaceous lineages of monocot flowering plants" (PDF). Proceedings of the National Academy of Sciences USA. 97 (9): 4707–4711. Bibcode:2000PNAS...97.4707B. doi:10.1073/pnas.080421597. PMC 18297. PMID 10759567.
- Bremer, K. (2002). "Gondwanan evolution of the grass alliance families (Poales)". Evolution. 56 (7): 1374–1387. doi:10.1111/j.0014-3820.2002.tb01451.x. PMID 12206239. S2CID 221734079.
- Bremer, Kåre; Janssen, Thomas (2006). "Gondwanan origin of major monocot groups inferred from dispersal-vicariance analysis". Aliso. 22: 22–27. doi:10.5642/aliso.20062201.03.
- Cameron, K. M.; Dickison, W. C. (1998). "Foliar architecture of vanilloid orchids: Insights into the evolution of reticulate leaf venation in monocots". Bot. J. Linn. Soc. 128: 45–70. doi:10.1006/bojl.1998.0183.
- Christenhusz, Maarten JM & Byng, J. W. (2016). "The number of known plants species in the world and its annual increase". Phytotaxa. 261 (3). Magnolia Press: 201–217. Bibcode:2016Phytx.261..201C. doi:10.11646/phytotaxa.261.3.1.
- Clifford, H T (1977). "Quantitative Studies of Inter-relationships Amongst the Liliatae". In Klaus Kubitzki (ed.). Flowering Plants. Evolution and Classification of Higher Categories Symposium, Hamburg, September 8–12, 1976. Plant Systematics and Evolution. Vol. Suppl. 1. Springer. pp. 77–95. doi:10.1007/978-3-7091-7076-2_6. ISBN 978-3-211-81434-5.
- Cronquist, Arthur; Takhtajan, Armen; Zimmermann, Walter (April 1966). "On the Higher Taxa of Embryobionta". Taxon. 15 (4): 129–134. Bibcode:1966Taxon..15..129C. doi:10.2307/1217531. JSTOR 1217531.
- Cronquist, Arthur (April 1969). "Broad Features of the System of Angiosperms". Taxon. 18 (2): 188–193. Bibcode:1969Taxon..18..188C. doi:10.2307/1218676. JSTOR 1218676.
- Dahlgren, Gertrud (July 1989). "An updated angiosperm classification". Botanical Journal of the Linnean Society. 100 (3): 197–203. doi:10.1111/j.1095-8339.1989.tb01717.x.
- Dahlgren, R. M. T. (February 1980). "A revised system of classification of the angiosperms". Botanical Journal of the Linnean Society. 80 (2): 91–124. doi:10.1111/j.1095-8339.1980.tb01661.x.
- Dahlgren, Rolf; Rasmussen, Finn N. (1983). "Monocotyledon Evolution: Characters and Phylogenetic Estimation". Evolutionary Biology. Vol. 16. pp. 255–395. doi:10.1007/978-1-4615-6971-8_7. ISBN 978-1-4615-6973-2.
- Donoghue, Michael J. (2005). "Key innovations, convergence, and success: macroevolutionary lessons from plant phylogeny" (PDF). Paleobiology. 31: 77–93. doi:10.1666/0094-8373(2005)031[0077:KICASM]2.0.CO;2. S2CID 36988476. Archived from the original on January 4, 2011.
- Doyle, James A; Donoghue, Michael J (April–June 1992). "Fossils and seed plant phylogeny reanalyzed" (PDF). Brittonia. 44 (2): 89–106. Bibcode:1992Britt..44...89D. doi:10.2307/2806826. JSTOR 2806826. S2CID 25304267. Archived from the original on August 27, 2008.
- Fay, Michael F. (May 2013). "Monocots". Botanical Journal of the Linnean Society. 172 (1): 1–4. doi:10.1111/boj.12052.
- Friis, E. M.; Pedersen, K. R.; Crane, P. R. (2004). "Araceae from the early Cretaceous of Portugal: Evidence on the emergence of monocotyledons". Proceedings of the National Academy of Sciences. 101 (47): 16565–16570. Bibcode:2004PNAS..10116565F. doi:10.1073/pnas.0407174101. PMC 534535. PMID 15546982.
- Friis, E. M.; Pedersen, K. R.; Crane, P. R. (2006). "Cretaceous angiosperm flowers: innovation and evolution in plant reproduction". Palaeogeog. Palaeoclim. Palaeoecol. 232 (2–4): 251–293. Bibcode:2006PPP...232..251F. doi:10.1016/j.palaeo.2005.07.006.
- Gandolfo, M. A; Nixon, K. C.; Crepet, W. L.; Stevenson, D. W.; Friis, E. M. (6 August 1998). "Oldest known fossils of monocotyledons". Nature. 394 (6693): 532–533. Bibcode:1998Natur.394..532G. doi:10.1038/28974. S2CID 4382842.
- Gandolfo, M. A.; Nixon, K. C.; Crepet, W. L. (2002). "Triuridaceae fossil flowers from the Upper Cretaceous of New Jersey". American Journal of Botany. 89 (12): 1940–1957. Bibcode:2002AmJB...89.1940G. doi:10.3732/ajb.89.12.1940. PMID 21665623.
- Hallier, Hans (31 July 1905). "Provisional scheme of the natural (phylogenetic) system of the flowering plants". New Phytologist. 4 (7): 151–162. Bibcode:1905NewPh...4..151H. doi:10.1111/j.1469-8137.1905.tb05894.x. hdl:2027/hvd.32044107266454.
- Henslow, George (May 1893). "A Theoretical Origin of Endogens from Exogens, through Self-Adaptation to an Aquatic Habit". Botanical Journal of the Linnean Society. 29 (204): 485–528. doi:10.1111/j.1095-8339.1893.tb02273.x.
- Herendeen, Patrick S.; Crane, Peter R.; Drinnan, Andrew N. (January 1995). "Fagaceous flowers, fruits, and cupules from the Campanian (Late Cretaceous) of Central Georgia, USA". International Journal of Plant Sciences. 156 (1): 93–116. Bibcode:1995IJPlS.156...93H. doi:10.1086/297231. JSTOR 2474901. S2CID 83651698.
- Hertweck, Kate L.; Kinney, Michael S.; Stuart, Stephanie A.; Maurin, Olivier; Mathews, Sarah; Chase, Mark W.; Gandolfo, Maria A.; Pires, J. Chris (July 2015), "Phylogenetics, divergence times and diversification from three genomic partitions in monocots", Botanical Journal of the Linnean Society, 178 (3): 375–393, doi:10.1111/boj.12260
- Huber, H (1969). "Die Samenmerkmale und Verwandtschaftsverhältnisse der Liliiflorae". Mitt. Bot. Staatssamml.[Mitteilungen der Botanischen Staatssammlung München] (in German). 8: 219–538.
- Moore, John P.; Lindsey, George G.; Farrant, Jill M.; Brandt, Wolf F. (2007). "An Overview of the Biology of the Desiccation-tolerant Resurrection Plant Myrothamnus flabellifolia". Annals of Botany. 99 (2): 211–217. doi:10.1093/aob/mcl269. PMC 2803006. PMID 17218343.
- Petit, G.; DeClerck, F. A. J.; Carrer, M.; Anfodillo, T. (31 January 2014). "Axial vessel widening in arborescent monocots". Tree Physiology. 34 (2): 137–145. doi:10.1093/treephys/tpt118. hdl:10568/66087. PMID 24488857.
- Sanderson, Michael J. (1997). "A nonparametric approach to estimating divergence times in the absence of rate constancy". Molecular Biology and Evolution. 14 (12): 1218–1231. doi:10.1093/oxfordjournals.molbev.a025731.
- Sanderson, M. J.; Thorne, J. L.; Wikström, N.; Bremer, K. (2004). "Molecular evidence on plant divergence times". American Journal of Botany. 91 (10): 1656–1665. doi:10.3732/ajb.91.10.1656. PMID 21652315.
- Strong, Donald R.; Ray, Thomas S. (1 January 1975). "Host Tree Location Behavior of a Tropical Vine (Monstera gigantea) by Skototropism". Science. 190 (4216): 804–806. Bibcode:1975Sci...190..804S. doi:10.1126/science.190.4216.804. JSTOR 1741614. S2CID 84386403.
- Takhtajan, A. (June 1964). "The Taxa of the Higher Plants above the Rank of Order". Taxon. 13 (5): 160–164. Bibcode:1964Taxon..13..160T. doi:10.2307/1216134. JSTOR 1216134. S2CID 86958633.
- Tang, Cuong Q.; Orme, C. David L.; Bunnefeld, Lynsey; Jones, F. Andrew; Powell, Silvana; Chase, Mark W.; Barraclough, Timothy G.; Savolainen, Vincent (October 2016). "Global monocot diversification: geography explains variation in species richness better than environment or biology". Botanical Journal of the Linnean Society. doi:10.1111/boj.12497. hdl:10044/1/39821.
- Thorne, Robert F. (1976). "A Phylogenetic Classification of the Angiospermae". Evolutionary Biology. Vol. 9. pp. 35–106. doi:10.1007/978-1-4615-6950-3_2. ISBN 978-1-4615-6952-7.
- Thorne, R. F. (1992a). "Classification and geography of the flowering plants". The Botanical Review. 58 (3): 225–348. Bibcode:1992BotRv..58..225T. doi:10.1007/BF02858611. S2CID 40348158.
- Thorne, R. F. (1992b). "An updated phylogenetic classification of the flowering plants". Aliso. 13 (2): 365–389. doi:10.5642/aliso.19921302.08. S2CID 85738663.
- Tomlinson, P. B. (1970). "Monocotyledons - towards an understanding of their morphology and anatomy". Adv. Bot. Res. Advances in Botanical Research. 3: 207–292. doi:10.1016/S0065-2296(08)60321-3. ISBN 9780120059034.
- Tomlinson, P. B.; Esler, A. E. (1 December 1973). "Establishment growth in woody monocotyledons native to New Zealand". New Zealand Journal of Botany. 11 (4): 627–644. Bibcode:1973NZJB...11..627T. doi:10.1080/0028825X.1973.10430305.
- Wikström, Niklas; Savolainen, Vincent; Chase, Mark W. (2001). "Evolution of the angiosperms: calibrating the family tree". Proceedings of the Royal Society of London B. 268 (1482): 2211–2220. doi:10.1098/rspb.2001.1782. PMC 1088868. PMID 11674868.
- Zimmermann, Martin H.; Tomlinson, P. B. (June 1972). "The vascular system of monocotyledonous stems". Botanical Gazette. 133 (2): 141–155. doi:10.1086/336628. S2CID 56468137.

==== Phylogenetics ====
- Bremer, Kåre; Wanntorp, Hans-Erik (Aug 1978). "Phylogenetic Systematics in Botany". Taxon. 27 (4): 317–329. Bibcode:1978Taxon..27..317B. doi:10.2307/1220367. JSTOR 1220367.
- Cantino, Philip D.; Doyle, James A.; Graham, Sean W.; Judd, Walter S.; Olmstead, Richard G.; Soltis, Douglas E.; Soltis, Pamela S.; Donoghue, Michael J. (2007). "Towards a phylogenetic nomenclature of Tracheophyta" (PDF). Taxon. 56 (3): 822–846. doi:10.2307/25065865. JSTOR 25065865. Archived from the original on July 5, 2008.
- Chase, Mark W.; Soltis, Douglas E.; Olmstead, Richard G.; Morgan, David; Les, Donald H.; Mishler, Brent D.; Duvall, Melvin R.; Price, Robert A.; Hills, Harold G.; Qiu, Yin-Long; Kron, Kathleen A.; Rettig, Jeffrey H.; Conti, Elena; Palmer, Jeffrey D.; Manhart, James R.; Sytsma, Kenneth J.; Michaels, Helen J.; Kress, W. John; Karol, Kenneth G.; Clark, W. Dennis; Hedren, Mikael; Gaut, Brandon S.; Jansen, Robert K.; Kim, Ki-Joong; Wimpee, Charles F.; Smith, James F.; Furnier, Glenn R.; Strauss, Steven H.; Xiang, Qui-Yun; Plunkett, Gregory M.; Soltis, Pamela S.; Swensen, Susan M.; Williams, Stephen E.; Gadek, Paul A.; Quinn, Christopher J.; Eguiarte, Luis E.; Golenberg, Edward; Learn, Gerald H.; Graham, Sean W.; Barrett, Spencer C. H.; Dayanandan, Selvadurai; Albert, Victor A. (1993). "Phylogenetics of Seed Plants: An Analysis of Nucleotide Sequences from the Plastid Gene rbcL" (PDF). Annals of the Missouri Botanical Garden. 80 (3): 528. Bibcode:1993AnMBG..80..528C. doi:10.2307/2399846. hdl:1969.1/179875. JSTOR 2399846.
- Chase, Mark W. (2004). "Monocot relationships: an overview". American Journal of Botany. 91 (10): 1645–1655. doi:10.3732/ajb.91.10.1645. PMID 21652314.
- Davis, Jerrold I.; Stevenson, Dennis W.; Petersen, Gitte; Seberg, Ole; Campbell, Lisa M.; Freudenstein, John V.; Goldman, Douglas H.; Hardy, Christopher R.; Michelangeli, Fabian A.; Simmons, Mark P.; Specht, Chelsea D.; Vergara-Silva, Francisco; Gandolfo, María (1 July 2004). "A Phylogeny of the Monocots, as Inferred from rbcL and atpA Sequence Variation, and a Comparison of Methods for Calculating Jackknife and Bootstrap Values" (PDF). Systematic Botany. 29 (3): 467–510. Bibcode:2004SysBo..29..467D. doi:10.1600/0363644041744365. S2CID 13108898. Archived from the original (PDF) on 23 October 2020.
- Du, Zhi-Yuan; Wang, Qing-Feng (July 2016). "Phylogenetic tree of vascular plants reveals the origins of aquatic angiosperms". Journal of Systematics and Evolution. 54 (4): 342–348. Bibcode:2016JSyEv..54..342D. doi:10.1111/jse.12182. S2CID 83881036.
- Duvall, Melvin R.; Clegg, Michael T.; Chase, Mark W.; Clark, W. Dennis; Kress, W. John; Hills, Harold G.; Eguiarte, Luis E.; Smith, James F.; Gaut, Brandon S.; Zimmer, Elizabeth A.; Learn, Gerald H. (1 January 1993). "Phylogenetic Hypotheses for the Monocotyledons Constructed from rbcL Sequence Data". Annals of the Missouri Botanical Garden. 80 (3): 607–619. Bibcode:1993AnMBG..80..607D. doi:10.2307/2399849. JSTOR 2399849. S2CID 20316595.
- Endress, P. K.; Doyle, J. A. (8 January 2009). "Reconstructing the ancestral angiosperm flower and its initial specializations". American Journal of Botany. 96 (1): 22–66. Bibcode:2009AmJB...96...22E. doi:10.3732/ajb.0800047. PMID 21628175.
- Givnish, Thomas J.; Pires, J.Chris; Graham, Sean W.; McPherson, Marc A.; Prince, Linda M.; Patterson, Thomas B.; Rai, Hardeep S.; Roalson, Eric H.; Evans, Timothy M.; Hahn, William J; Millam, Kendra C.; Meerow, Alan W; Molvray, Mia; Kores, Paul J.; O'Brien, Heath E.; Hall, Jocelyn C.; Kress, W. John; Sytsma, Kenneth J. (2005). "Repeated evolution of net venation and fleshy fruits among monocots in shaded habitats confirms a priori predictions: evidence from an ndhF phylogeny". Proceedings of the Royal Society B: Biological Sciences. 272 (1571): 1481–1490. doi:10.1098/rspb.2005.3067. PMC 1559828. PMID 16011923.
- Givnish, Thomas J.; Ames, Mercedes; McNeal, Joel R.; McKain, Michael R.; Steele, P. Roxanne; dePamphilis, Claude W.; Graham, Sean W.; Pires, J. Chris; Stevenson, Dennis W.; Zomlefer, Wendy B.; Briggs, Barbara G.; Duvall, Melvin R.; Moore, Michael J.; Heaney, J. Michael; Soltis, Douglas E.; Soltis, Pamela S.; Thiele, Kevin; Leebens-Mack, James H. (27 December 2010). "Assembling the Tree of the Monocotyledons: Plastome Sequence Phylogeny and Evolution of Poales". Annals of the Missouri Botanical Garden. 97 (4): 584–616. Bibcode:2010AnMBG..97..584G. doi:10.3417/2010023. S2CID 15036227.
- Givnish, Thomas J.; Zuluaga, Alejandro; Spalink, Daniel; Soto Gomez, Marybel; Lam, Vivienne K. Y.; Saarela, Jeffrey M.; Sass, Chodon; Iles, William J. D.; de Sousa, Danilo José Lima; Leebens-Mack, James; Chris Pires, J.; Zomlefer, Wendy B.; Gandolfo, Maria A.; Davis, Jerrold I.; Stevenson, Dennis W.; dePamphilis, Claude; Specht, Chelsea D.; Graham, Sean W.; Barrett, Craig F.; Ané, Cécile (November 2018). "Monocot plastid phylogenomics, timeline, net rates of species diversification, the power of multi-gene analyses, and a functional model for the origin of monocots". American Journal of Botany. 105 (11): 1888–1910. doi:10.1002/ajb2.1178. hdl:2027.42/146610. PMID 30368769.
- Goremykin, Vadim V.; Hansman, Sabine; Martin, William F. (March 1997). "Evolutionary analysis of 58 proteins encoded in six completely sequenced chloroplast genomes: revised molecular estimates of two seed plant divergence times". Plant Syst. Evol. 206 (1): 337–351. Bibcode:1997PSyEv.206..337G. doi:10.1007/bf00987956. S2CID 4228662.
- Hertweck, Kate L.; Kinney, Michael S.; Stuart, Stephanie A.; Maurin, Olivier; Mathews, Sarah; Chase, Mark W.; Gandolfo, Maria A.; Pires, J. Chris (July 2015). "Phylogenetics, divergence times and diversification from three genomic partitions in monocots". Botanical Journal of the Linnean Society. 178 (3): 375–393. doi:10.1111/boj.12260.
- Janssen, Thomas; Bremer, Kare (December 2004). "The age of major monocot groups inferred from 800+ rbcL sequences". Botanical Journal of the Linnean Society. 146 (4): 385–398. doi:10.1111/j.1095-8339.2004.00345.x.
- Leebens-Mack, Jim; Raubeson, Linda A.; Cui, Liying; Kuehl, Jennifer V.; Fourcade, Mathew H.; Chumley, Timothy W.; Boore, Jeffrey L.; Jansen, Robert K.; dePamphilis, Claude W. (October 2005). "Identifying the basal angiosperm node in chloroplast genome phylogenies: Sampling one's way out of the Felsenstein zone". Mol. Biol. Evol. 22 (10): 1948–1963. doi:10.1093/molbev/msi191. PMID 15944438.
- Loconte, Henry; Stevenson, Dennis W. (September 1991). "Cladistics of the Magnoliidae". Cladistics. 7 (3): 267–296. doi:10.1111/j.1096-0031.1991.tb00038.x. PMID 34933465. S2CID 84872583.
- Magallon, S; Gomez-Acevedo, S; Sanchez-Reyes, LL; Tania Hernandez-Hernandez, T (2015). "A metacalibrated time-tree documents the early rise of flowering plant phylogenetic diversity". New Phytologist. 207 (2): 437–453. Bibcode:2015NewPh.207..437M. doi:10.1111/nph.13264. PMID 25615647.
- Patterson, T. B.; Givnish, T. J. (2002). "Phylogeny, concerted convergence, and phylogenetic niche conservatism in the core Liliales: insights from rbcL and ndhF sequence data" (PDF). Evolution. 56 (2): 233–252. doi:10.1111/j.0014-3820.2002.tb01334.x. PMID 11926492. S2CID 39420833. Archived from the original on April 21, 2004.
- Qiu, Yin-Long; Li, Libo; Wang, Bin; Xue, Jia-Yu; Hendry, Tory A.; Li, Rui-Qi; Brown, Joseph W.; Liu, Yang; Hudson, Geordan T.; Chen, Zhi-Duan (November 2010). "Angiosperm phylogeny inferred from sequences of four mitochondrial genes". Journal of Systematics and Evolution. 48 (6): 391–425. Bibcode:2010JSyEv..48..391Q. doi:10.1111/j.1759-6831.2010.00097.x. hdl:2027.42/79100. S2CID 85623329.
- Savard, L.; Strauss, S. H.; Chase, M. W.; Michaud, M.; Bosquet, J. (May 1994). "Chloroplast and nuclear gene sequences indicate late Pennsylvanian time for the last common ancestor of extant seed plants". Proceedings of the National Academy of Sciences of the United States of America. 91 (11): 5163–5167. Bibcode:1994PNAS...91.5163S. doi:10.1073/pnas.91.11.5163. PMC 43952. PMID 8197201.
- Soltis, Pamela S; Soltis, Douglas E (2004). "The origin and diversification of angiosperms". American Journal of Botany. 91 (10): 1614–1626. Bibcode:2004AmJB...91.1614S. doi:10.3732/ajb.91.10.1614. PMID 21652312.
- Soltis, D. E.; Smith, S. A.; Cellinese, N.; Wurdack, K. J.; Tank, D. C.; Brockington, S. F.; Refulio-Rodriguez, N. F.; Walker, J. B.; Moore, M. J.; Carlsward, B. S.; Bell, C. D.; Latvis, M.; Crawley, S.; Black, C.; Diouf, D.; Xi, Z.; Rushworth, C. A.; Gitzendanner, M. A.; Sytsma, K. J.; Qiu, Y.-L.; Hilu, K. W.; Davis, C. C.; Sanderson, M. J.; Beaman, R. S.; Olmstead, R. G.; Judd, W. S.; Donoghue, M. J.; Soltis, P. S. (8 April 2011). "Angiosperm phylogeny: 17 genes, 640 taxa". American Journal of Botany. 98 (4): 704–730. Bibcode:2011AmJB...98..704S. doi:10.3732/ajb.1000404. hdl:2027.42/142064. PMID 21613169.
- Soltis, Pamela S; Soltis, Douglas E (April 2016). "Ancient WGD events as drivers of key innovations in angiosperms". Current Opinion in Plant Biology. 30: 159–165. Bibcode:2016COPB...30..159S. doi:10.1016/j.pbi.2016.03.015. PMID 27064530.
- Trias-Blasi, Anna; Baker, William J.; Haigh, Anna L.; Simpson, David A.; Weber, Odile; Wilkin, Paul (25 June 2015). "A genus-level phylogenetic linear sequence of monocots". Taxon. 64 (3): 552–581. Bibcode:2015Taxon..64..552T. doi:10.12705/643.9. S2CID 91678240.
- Zeng, Liping; Zhang, Qiang; Sun, Renran; Kong, Hongzhi; Zhang, Ning; Ma, Hong (24 September 2014). "Resolution of deep angiosperm phylogeny using conserved nuclear genes and estimates of early divergence times". Nature Communications. 5 (4956): 4956. Bibcode:2014NatCo...5.4956Z. doi:10.1038/ncomms5956. PMC 4200517. PMID 25249442.

==== APG ====
- APG (1998). "An ordinal classification for the families of flowering plants". Annals of the Missouri Botanical Garden. 85 (4): 531–553. Bibcode:1998AnMBG..85..531.. doi:10.2307/2992015. JSTOR 2992015. S2CID 82134384.
- APG II (2003). "An Update of the Angiosperm Phylogeny Group Classification for the orders and families of flowering plants: APG II". Botanical Journal of the Linnean Society. 141 (4): 399–436. doi:10.1046/j.1095-8339.2003.t01-1-00158.x.
- APG III (2009). "An Update of the Angiosperm Phylogeny Group classification for the orders and families of flowering plants: APG III". Botanical Journal of the Linnean Society. 161 (2): 105–121. doi:10.1111/j.1095-8339.2009.00996.x. hdl:10654/18083.
- APG IV (2016). "An update of the Angiosperm Phylogeny Group classification for the orders and families of flowering plants: APG IV". Botanical Journal of the Linnean Society. 181 (1): 1–20. doi:10.1111/boj.12385.
- Chase, Mark W; Reveal, James L (2009). "A phylogenetic classification of the land plants to accompany APG III" (PDF). Botanical Journal of the Linnean Society. 161 (2): 122–127. doi:10.1111/j.1095-8339.2009.01002.x.
- Haston, Elspeth; Richardson, James E.; Stevens, Peter F.; Chase, Mark W.; Harris, David J. (2009). "The Linear Angiosperm Phylogeny Group (LAPG) III: a linear sequence of the families in APG III". Botanical Journal of the Linnean Society. 161 (2): 128–131. doi:10.1111/j.1095-8339.2009.01000.x.

=== Websites and databases ===
- Hahn, William J. (1997). "Monocotyledons". Tree of Life web project.
- Stevens, P.F. (2015) [2001], Angiosperm Phylogeny Website, Missouri Botanical Garden (see also Angiosperm Phylogeny Website)
- Givnish, Thomas. "Assembling the phylogeny of the monocots". Monocot AToL Project. Madison: Department of Botany, University of Wisconsin. Archived from the original on 14 September 2006.
- CoL (2015). "Catalogue of Life". ITIS.
- IUCN (2016). "The IUCN Red List of Threatened Species". International Union for Conservation of Nature and Natural Resources.
- "National Botanic Gardens of Ireland". 2016.
- "Tropicos". Missouri Botanical Garden. 2015.
- "Class: Monocotyledoneae – Monocot". Plant Life Forms. Archived from the original on 13 January 2010.
