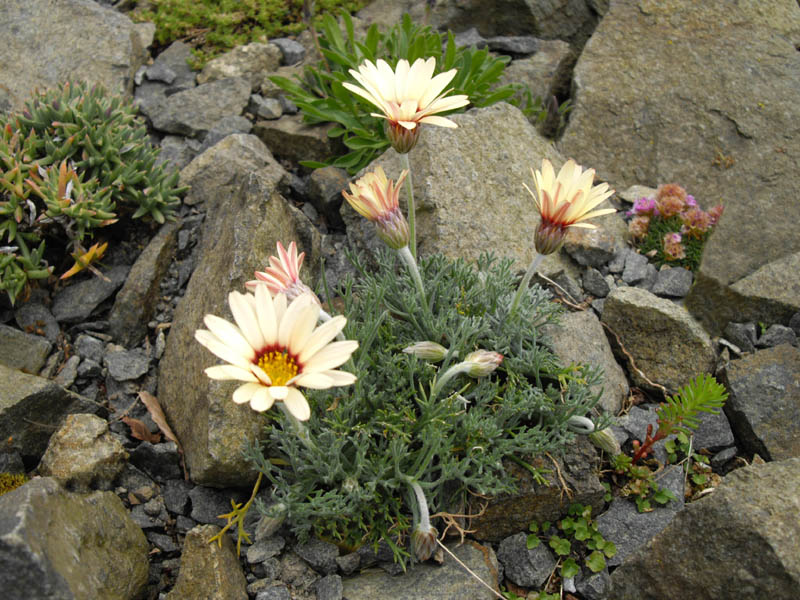
- R. catananche

Scientific classification
- Kingdom: Plantae
- Clade: Tracheophytes
- Clade: Angiosperms
- Clade: Eudicots
- Clade: Asterids
- Order: Asterales
- Family: Asteraceae
- Subfamily: Asteroideae
- Tribe: Anthemideae
- Genus: Rhodanthemum; B.H.Wilcox, K.Bremer & Humphries

Type species
- Rhodanthemum arundanum (Boiss.) B.H.Wilcox, K.Bremer & Humphries

Synonyms
- Leucanthemum sect. Rhodanthemum Vogt; Leucanthemum subg. chrysanthemopsis Maire nom. nud.

= Rhodanthemum =

Genus of flowering plants

Rhodanthemum is a genus of flowering plants in the family Asteraceae, mostly native to exposed rocky places in Northern Africa (Morocco and Algeria). Formerly included in either Chrysanthemum or Leucanthemum, the 10 or 15 species of Rhodanthemum display many similarities to their former congeners, with composite daisy-like flowers. They are mat-forming, prostrate perennials or subshrubs, and some are cultivated as ornamental plants.

== Taxonomy ==
It was described by Balafama Helen Wilcox, Kåre Bremer, and Christopher John Humphries in 1993 with Rhodanthemum arundanum (Boiss.) B.H.Wilcox, K.Bremer & Humphries as the type species.

=== Etymology ===
The botanical name comes from the Greek ῥόδον (rose) + ἄνθεμον (flower).

=== Species ===
It has 15 species:

- Rhodanthemum arundanum (Boiss.) B.H.Wilcox, K.Bremer & Humphries
- Rhodanthemum atlanticum (Ball) B.H.Wilcox, K.Bremer & Humphries
- Rhodanthemum briquetii (Maire) B.H.Wilcox, K.Bremer & Humphries
- Rhodanthemum catananche (Ball) B.H.Wilcox, K.Bremer & Humphries
- Rhodanthemum depressum (Ball) B.H.Wilcox, K.Bremer & Humphries
- Rhodanthemum gayanum (Coss. & Durieu) B.H.Wilcox, K.Bremer & Humphries
- Rhodanthemum hosmariense (Ball) B.H.Wilcox, K.Bremer & Humphries
- Rhodanthemum ifniense (Font Quer) Ibn Tattou
- Rhodanthemum laouense Vogt
- Rhodanthemum maresii (Coss.) B.H.Wilcox, K.Bremer & Humphries
- Rhodanthemum maroccanum (Batt.) B.H.Wilcox, K.Bremer & Humphries
- Rhodanthemum mesatlanticum (Emb. & Maire) B.H.Wilcox, K.Bremer & Humphries
- Rhodanthemum pseudocatananche (Maire) B.H.Wilcox, K.Bremer & Humphries
- Rhodanthemum × pseudoredieri Flor.Wagner, Vogt & Oberpr.
- Rhodanthemum quezelii Dobignard & Duret
- Rhodanthemum redieri (Maire) B.H.Wilcox, K.Bremer & Humphries

== Distribution ==
It is native to Algeria, Morocco, and Spain.
