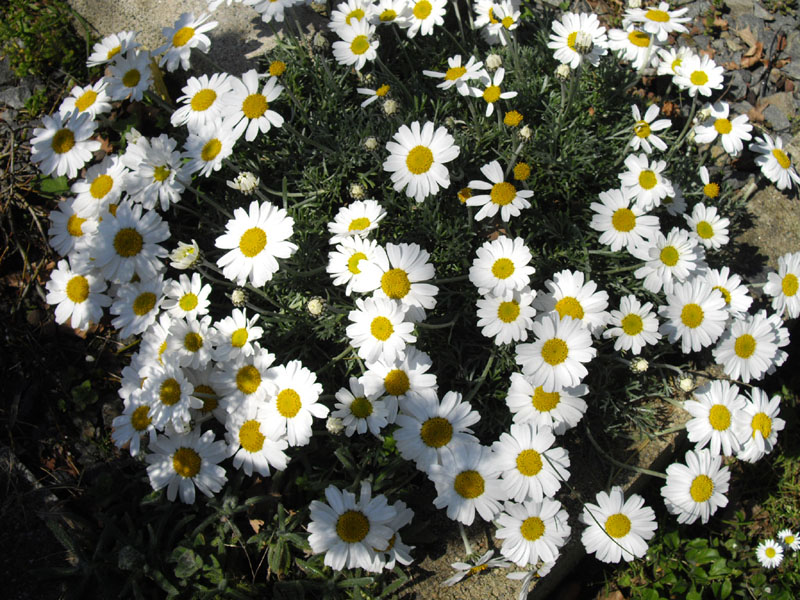

Scientific classification
- Kingdom: Plantae
- Clade: Tracheophytes
- Clade: Angiosperms
- Clade: Eudicots
- Clade: Asterids
- Order: Asterales
- Family: Asteraceae
- Genus: Rhodanthemum
- Species: R. hosmariense

Binomial name
- Rhodanthemum hosmariense (Ball) B.H.Wilcox, K.Bremer & Humphries

= Rhodanthemum hosmariense =

Species of flowering plant

Rhodanthemum hosmariense, the Moroccan daisy, is a species of flowering plant in the family Asteraceae, native to the Atlas Mountains of Morocco. It is a bushy, prostrate subshrub growing to 30 cm (12 in) tall and broad, with deeply divided silvery leaves and solitary, daisy-like, composite flower-heads in summer.

It is suitable for cultivation in an alpine garden or alpine house, where it is useful as groundcover. It has gained the Royal Horticultural Society's Award of Garden Merit.

== Taxonomy ==
This is one of a group of plants which have been intensively studied, with considerable debate as to their correct parentage. As a result, an unusually large number of synonyms exists, including the following:-

- Chrysanthemopsis hosmariense
- Chrysanthemum hosmariense
- Chrysanthemum maresii
- Chrysanthemum maresii var. hosmariense
- Leucanthemopsis hosmariensis
- Leucanthemum hosmariense
- Pyrethropsis hosmariense
- Pyrethropsis maresii var. hosmariense
