= Peter Crane =

British botanist (born 1954)

Sir Peter Crane
- Occupations: President of the Oak Spring Garden Foundation; Senior Research Scientist

Academic background
- Education: University of Reading (B.Sc. and Ph.D.)

Academic work
- Discipline: Botanist
- Institutions: Oak Spring Garden Foundation Yale University; The University of Chicago; The Royal Botanic Gardens, Kew The Field Museum of Natural History

Sir Peter Crane FRS (born 18 July 1954) is the current president of the Oak Spring Garden Foundation and senior research scientist in the School of Forestry and Environmental Studies at Yale University. In addition to his work in leading and developing educational and natural history organizations, including the Field Museum in Chicago and the Royal Botanic Gardens, Kew, he has had a long career as a professor and researcher in both the UK and the United States. He is best known for his work on the origin and early evolution of flowering plants (angiosperms) based on studies of the plant fossil record. His popular writing includes Ginkgo: The Tree That Time Forgot, a book that traces the evolution and cultural history of Ginkgo biloba.

== Personal life and education ==
Peter Crane was born in Kettering, Northamptonshire in the United Kingdom. He attended Kettering Grammar School where he developed a strong interest in local history and archaeology as well as plants, and the University of Reading, where he received his BSc in botany, with honours, in 1975. He received his Ph.D. in Botany from Reading in 1981, having also served on the faculty there from 1978 with his thesis, "Studies on the Flora of the Reading Beds (Upper Palaeocene)."

Crane is married with two children, a daughter and son.

== Career ==
Peter Crane has held positions at the University of Reading (1978-1981), the Field Museum (1982-1999), the Royal Botanic Gardens, Kew (1999-2006), the University of Chicago (2006-2009), Yale University (2009-2016) and the Oak Spring Garden Foundation (2016–present), among others. He has also held visiting or part-time positions at universities and museums around the world. The following section discusses some of his professional accomplishments in more detail.

=== The Field Museum of Natural History ===
Crane spent about 17 years working at the Field Museum of Natural History. Following a postdoctoral research position at Indiana University, Bloomington, Crane began in the Field Museum's Geology department as assistant curator of paleobotany. From 1982 to 1992, he held a variety of curatorial positions in the department of geology. Following a brief period as a vice-president of the museum, Crane became director of the Field Museum in 1995. His tenure as Director of the Field Museum saw strengthening of the museum's programs in collections and research as well as the creation of two cross departmental units, the Center for Cultural Understanding and Change, and the Office of Environmental and Conservation Programs. His time as Director also included the acquisition of "Sue," a well-preserved and almost complete Tyrannosaurus rex skeleton. Sue has since become an iconic fixture at the Field Museum.

=== The Royal Botanic Gardens, Kew ===
In 1999, Crane left the Field Museum to become director and chief executive of the Royal Botanic Gardens, Kew. Crane sought to better connect the conservation and botanical work at Kew with the public side of the institution. Crane's time at Kew included the attainment of UNESCO World Heritage site status and an embrace of digital technology, as well as an increase in the presence of seasonal themes and festivals that helped increase visitor attendance. His tenure at Kew saw increased visitation, both at Kew and also at Wakehurst Place, and a strengthening emphasis on the importance of biodiversity and the world of plants for the future of people.

=== The University of Chicago ===
Upon taking the position at Kew, Crane had said that he would not spend the rest of his career there. True to his word, Crane left Kew in 2006 to return to the United States, taking a University Professorship at the University of Chicago. Crane spent three years at the University of Chicago.

=== Yale University ===
Crane became the dean of the Yale School of Forestry and Environmental Studies (FES) in 2009 (succeeding James Speth). His arrival coincided with the rippling effects of the late 2008 Great Recession, and Crane played an important role in stabilizing the school's finances. Among his many other duties, he was involved in a variety of projects to provide student financial support and to increase student involvement in research. He also forged connections with other graduate programs (including the Yale School of Management). Crane also recruited several scholars to the school and sought to strengthen programs supporting diversity and inclusion. In regards to research, Crane worked to increase research collaboration within the school.

=== Oak Spring Garden Foundation ===
In June 2016, Crane moved to northern Virginia to lead The Oak Spring Garden Foundation, a nascent nonprofit founded by the landscape designer and fashion icon Rachel "Bunny" Lambert Mellon. Located on part of the Mellons' former Virginia estate, called Oak Spring, the Foundation's mission is to "support and inspire fresh thinking and bold action on the history and future of plants, including the art and culture of plants, gardens and landscapes." Containing Bunny Mellon's gardens and rare book library, the Oak Spring Garden Foundation supports research and scholarship relating to the diversity and future of plants; the art of plants, gardens, and landscapes. Crane is the inaugural president of the foundation.

== Research and publications ==
Peter Crane's research interests include:

1. Large-scale patterns and processes of plant evolution, plant paleontology.
2. Integrated paleobotanical and neobotanical studies of plant diversity and evolution.
3. Conservation of plant diversity, including crop diversity.
4. Strategic planning for collections-based not-for-profit organizations, especially museums and botanical gardens.

As well as numerous scientific and popular articles, Crane has written Ginkgo: The Tree That Time Forgot (Yale University Press, 2013), been an editor for peer-reviewed journals such as Paleobiology and The Botanical Review of the Linnaean Society, and contributed as editor to multiple volumes on the evolution and conservation of plants. He also co-wrote two major books on plant evolution: The Origin and Diversification of Land Plants (Smithsonian Institution Scholarly Press, 1997), with Paul Kenrick; and Early Flowers and Angiosperm Evolution, with Else Marie Friis and Kaj Pedersen (Cambridge University Press, 2011).

== Honors and awards ==
He is a fellow of the Royal Society (1998), a member of the American Academy of Arts and Sciences, a foreign associate of the United States National Academy of Sciences (2001), a foreign member of the Royal Swedish Academy of Sciences (2002), and a Member of the Deutsche Akademie der Naturforscher Leopoldina (German National Academy of Sciences, 2004). He was awarded a knighthood on 12 June 2004 in the 2004 Birthday Honours for services to horticulture and conservation. In 2014 he was awarded the International Prize for Biology. In 2024 he was awarded the Darwin-Wallace Medal by the Linnean Society.

He is the recipient of several honorary degrees including from Sewanee: The University of the South and the University of Connecticut in the United States, and the University of Kingston, the University of Portsmouth and Cambridge University in the UK.
