= Kåre Bremer =

Swedish botanist and academic (b. 1948)

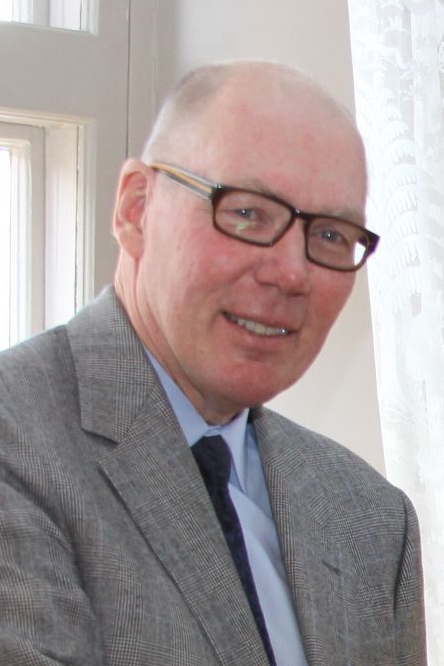
- Kåre Bremer
- Born: 17 January 1948 (age 78)
- Known for: APG
- Scientific career
- Author abbrev. (botany): K.Bremer

Kåre Bremer (born 17 January 1948) is a Swedish botanist and academic. He has also been Vice-Chancellor of Stockholm University.

== Career ==
Professor Bremer received his doctorate in botany from Stockholm University in 1976, where he worked as lecturer and research assistant in the department from 1972 to 1975, and full-time from 1976. In 1979 he was appointed Docent. In 1980 he became Curator at the Museum of Natural History in Stockholm in the Department of Spermatophyte Botany. From 1985 to 1986 he was also a Research Associate and BA Krukoff Curator of African Botany at the Missouri Botanical Garden.

Following this Bremer was installed as Professor of Systematic Botany at Uppsala University in 1989, where he also became head of the department from 1992 to 1999, and Dean of Biology from 1993 to 1999. From 2001 to 2004 he was Secretary for Science and Technology Studies at the Swedish Research Council. In January 2004 he left the University of Uppsala to take up a position as Rector (Vice-Chancellor) at Stockholm University on 1 February that year. He is currently professor of Systematic Botany at that university.

== Personal life ==
He is married to his colleague, Birgitta Bremer, and they have two children.

== Achievements ==
Professor Bremer is a board member of the Swedish Association of Universities and Institutes of Higher Education (Sveriges universitets- och högskoleförbund, SUHF) and is a member of the Royal Swedish Academy of Sciences (Kungliga Vetenskapsakademien, KVA). He has been a member of the Linnean Society of London since 1998. In 2006 he received the King's Medal (Hans Majestät Konungens medalj), twelfth level with the Royal Order of the Seraphim (Kungliga Serafimerorden).

The work of the Bremers at Uppsala University became the basis for the modern system of plant taxonomy, known as the Angiosperm Phylogeny Group (APG) formed by them and other international flowering plant systematists. The system was published in 1998 largely based on the work of Bremer et al. at Uppsala University, and was available on the internet in 1996.

Moreover, Bremer is known for several important innovations in phylogenetics (Bremer's support) and biogeography (ancestral areas analysis).

== Species ==
Two African species of the Asteraceae family have been named after him, Athanasia bremeri and Pseudoblepharispermum bremeri.

== Sources ==
- Personal website: Kåre Bremer
- Website: Birgitta Bremer
- Harvard Botanist Index

Preceded by Gunnel Engwall	Vice Chancellor, Stockholm University; 2004-2013	Succeeded by Astrid Söderbergh Widding
