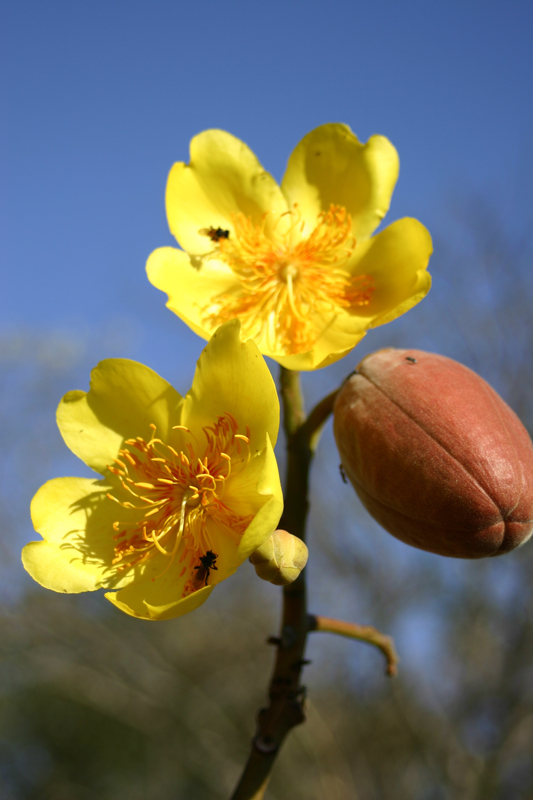
- Cochlospermum vitifolium in Guanacaste, Costa Rica

Scientific classification
- Kingdom: Plantae
- Clade: Embryophytes
- Clade: Tracheophytes
- Clade: Spermatophytes
- Clade: Angiosperms
- Clade: Eudicots
- Clade: Rosids
- Order: Malvales
- Family: Bixaceae
- Genus: Cochlospermum; Kunth

Synonyms
- Amoreuxia Moc. & Sessé ex DC.; Azeredia Arruda ex Allemão; Euryanthe Cham. & Schltdl.; Maximilianea Mart. ex Schrank; Wittelsbachia Mart. & Zucc.

= Cochlospermum =

Genus of trees

Cochlospermum is a genus of trees in the Bixaceae family; some classifications place this genus in the family Cochlospermaceae. It is native to tropical regions of the world, particularly Latin America, Africa, the Indian subcontinent, and Australia.

Some species of Cochlospermum (C. tinctorium) have been used as a yellow dyestuff on leather products and fabrics.

== Species ==
Species include:

- Cochlospermum adjanyae Goyder & A.Gomes - Angola
- Cochlospermum angolense Welw. ex Oliv. - Angola, Zaïre
- Cochlospermum arafuricum Cowie & R.A.Kerrigan - Northern Territory, Australia
- Cochlospermum fraseri Planch. - Western Australia, Northern Territory
- Cochlospermum gillivraei Benth. - Northern Territory, Queensland, Papua New Guinea
- Cochlospermum gonzalezii (Sprague & L.Riley) Byng & Christenh. - western Mexico and Arizona, USA
- Cochlospermum intermedium Mildbr. - Central African Republic
- Cochlospermum macnamarae Hislop, K.R.Thiele & Brassington - Western Australia
- Cochlospermum malvifolium (A.Gray) Byng & Christenh. - northeastern Mexico
- Cochlospermum noldei Poppend. - Angola
- Cochlospermum orinocense (Kunth) Steud. - Panama, Colombia, Venezuela, the Guianas, Brazil, Peru
- Cochlospermum palmatifidum (DC.) Byng & Christenh. - Colombia, Costa Rica, El Salvador, Nicaragua, Guatemala, Honduras, Mexico, USA (Arizona, New Mexico)
- Cochlospermum planchonii Hook.f. ex Planch. - tropical Africa from Sierra Leone to Sudan
- Cochlospermum regium (Schrank) Pilg. - Brazil, Bolivia, Paraguay
- Cochlospermum religiosum (L.) Alston - India, Sri Lanka, Western Himalayas, Myanmar; naturalized in Cambodia, Java, Bali, Peninsular Malaysia
- Cochlospermum tetraporum Hallier f. - Bolivia, Paraguay, northwestern Argentina
- Cochlospermum tinctorium Perrier ex A.Rich. - tropical Africa from Sierra Leone to Uganda
- Cochlospermum vitifolium (Willd.) Spreng. - Mexico, Cuba, Central America, Colombia, Venezuela, Guianas, Peru, Ecuador, Brazil; naturalized in Trinidad, Lesser Antilles, Puerto Rico, Hispaniola, Bahamas
- Cochlospermum wittei Robyns - Zaïre
- Cochlospermum wrightii (A.Gray) Byng & Christenh. - Mexico, Netherlands Antilles, Peru, and Texas, USA

== Gallery ==
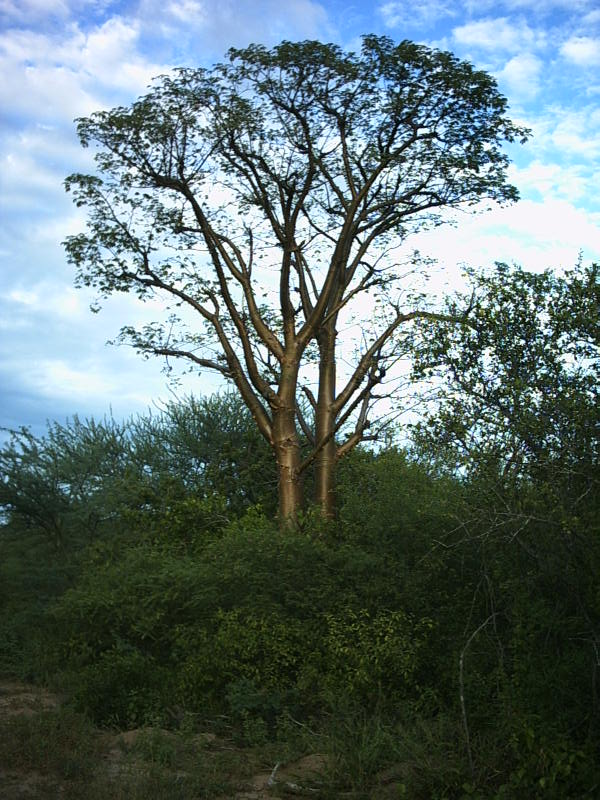
Individual of Cochlospermum tetraporum emerging over the canopy of the Chacoan thicket.

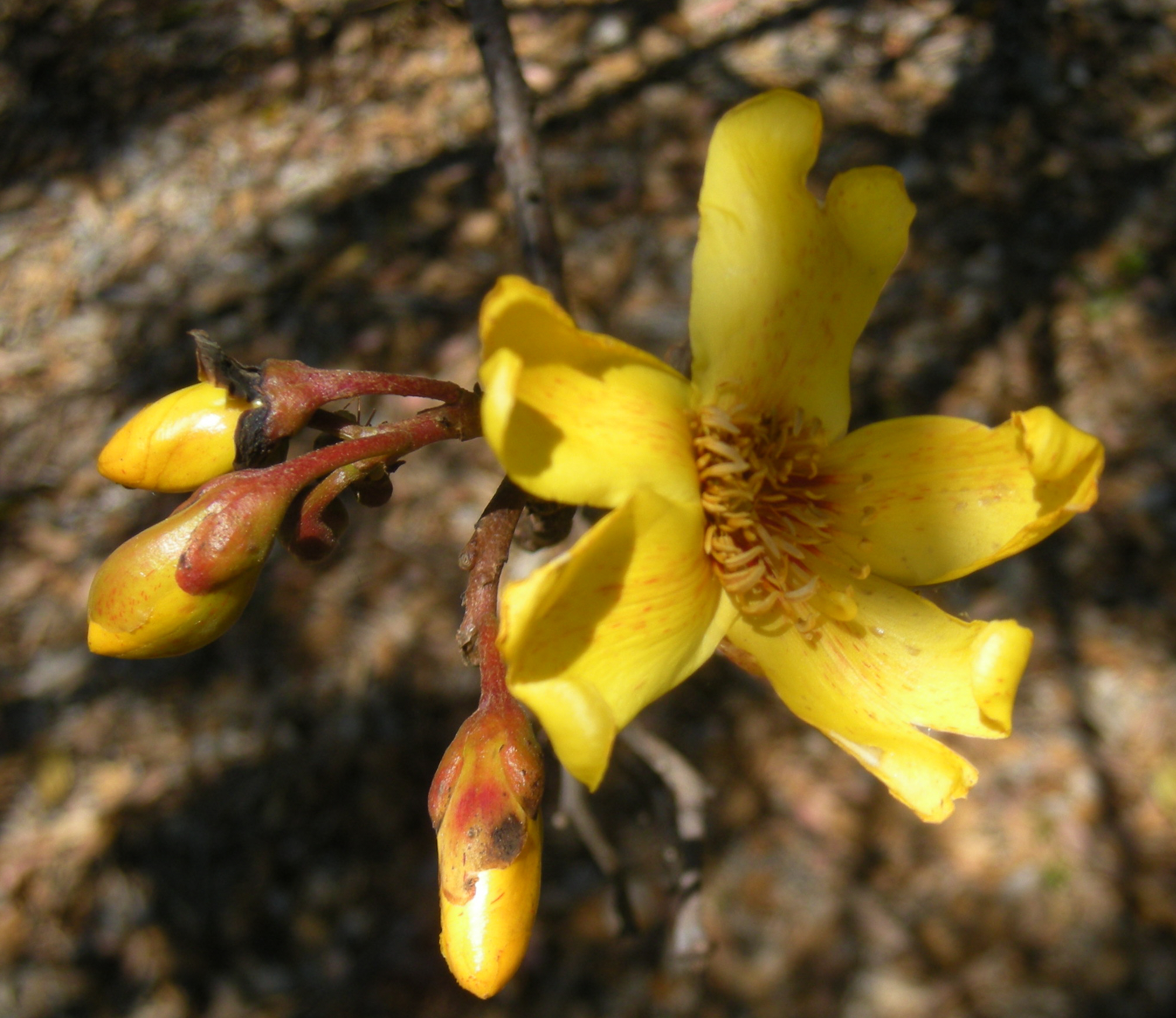
Cochlospermum fraseri flower.

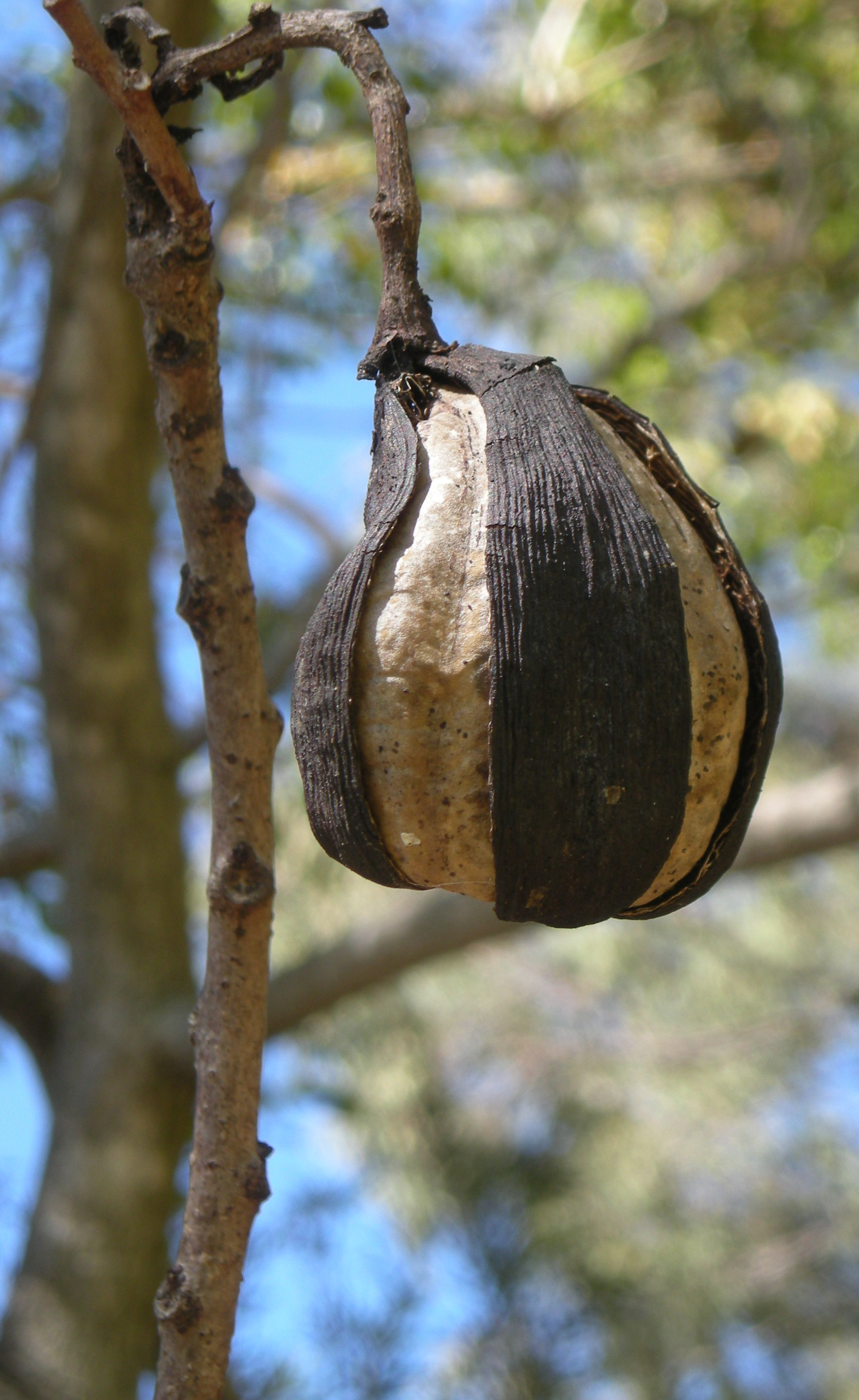
Cochlospermum fraseri fruit.

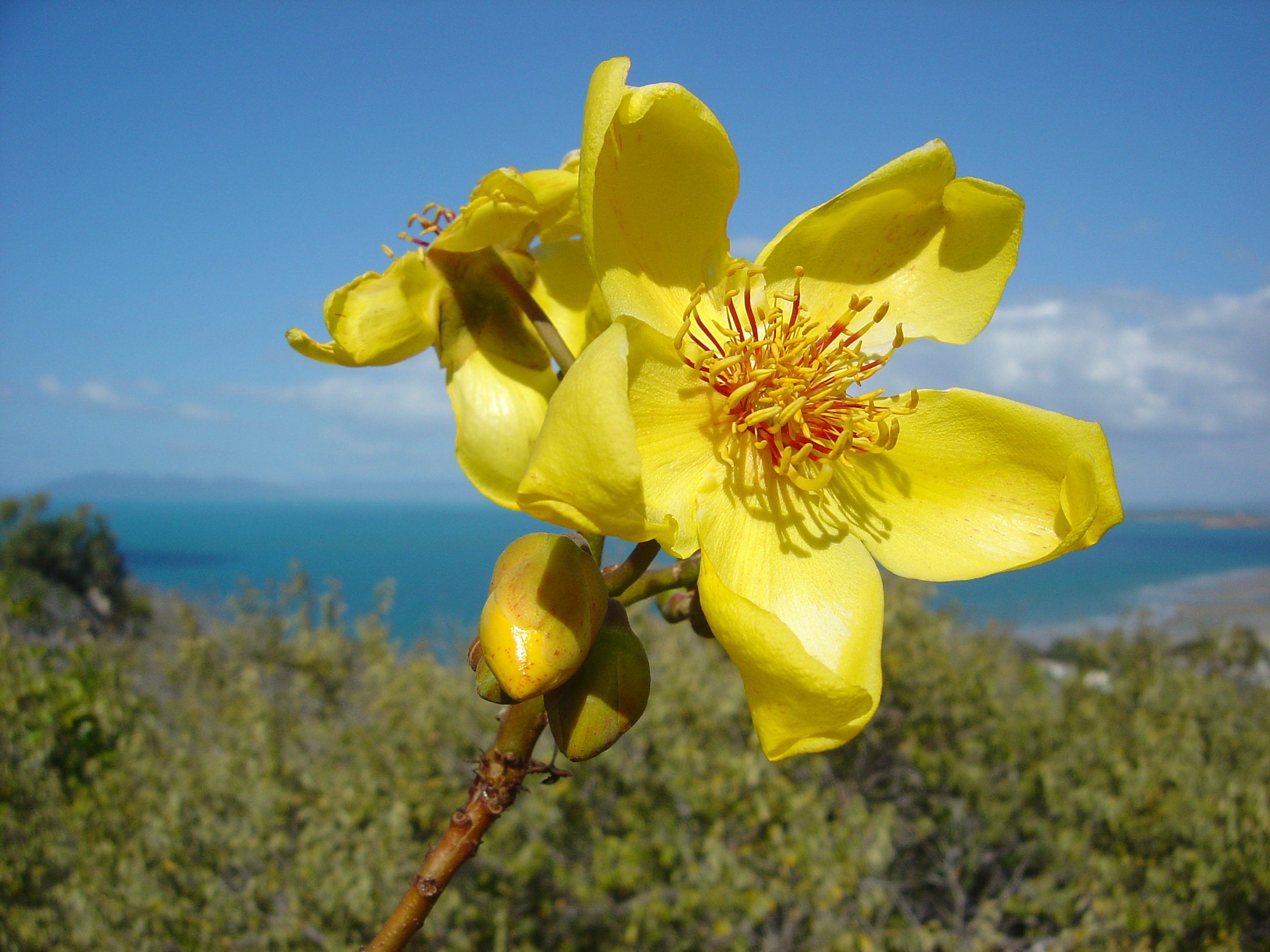
Cochlospermum gillivraei

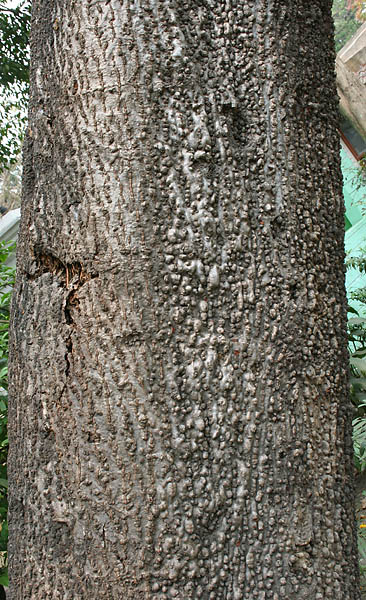
Cochlospermum religiosum trunk in Kolkata, West Bengal, India.

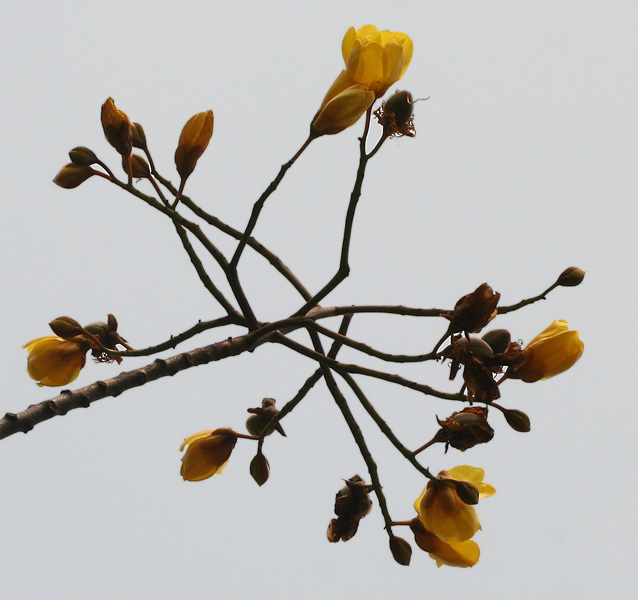
Cochlospermum religiosum flowers in Kolkata

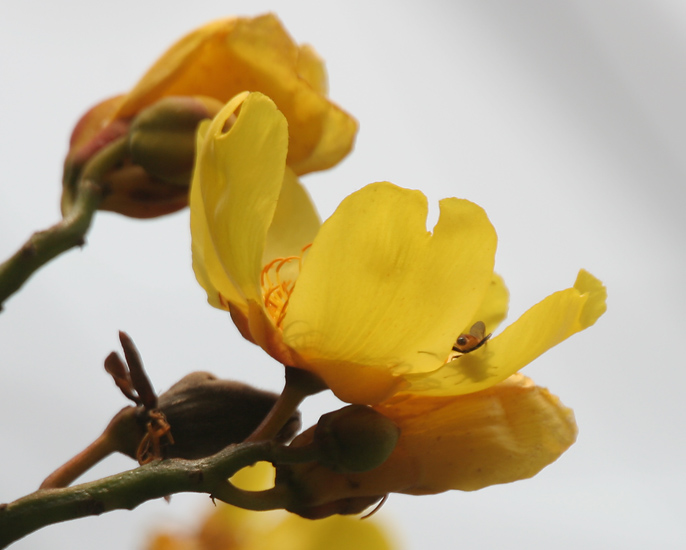
Cochlospermum religiosum flowers in Kolkata

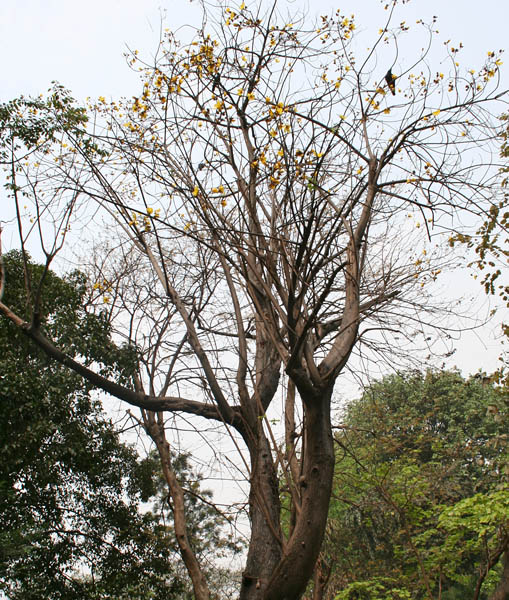
Cochlospermum religiosum flowering tree in Kolkata

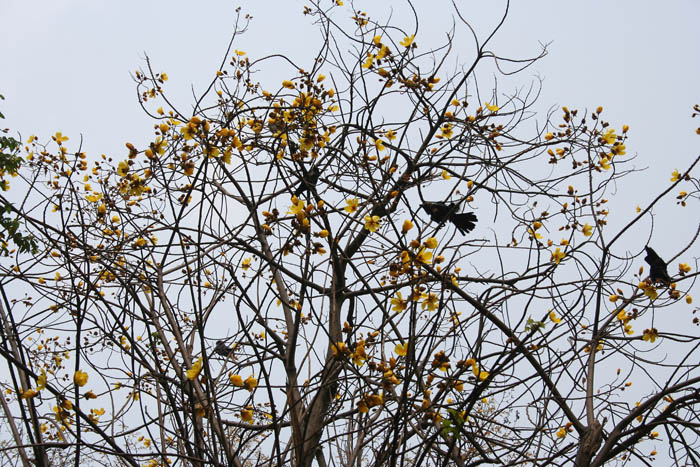
Cochlospermum religiosum flowering canopy in Kolkata

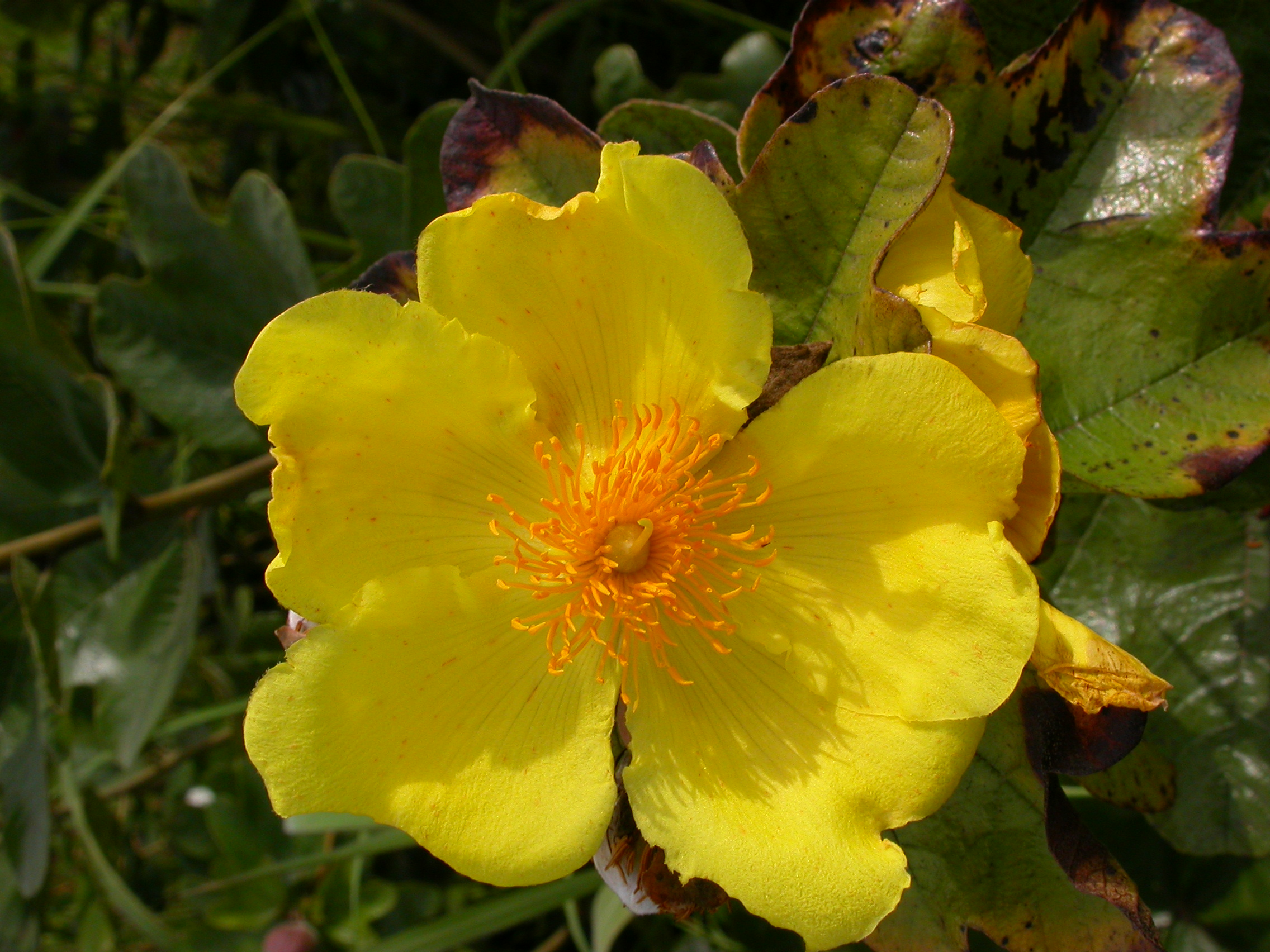
Cochlospermum planchonii flower

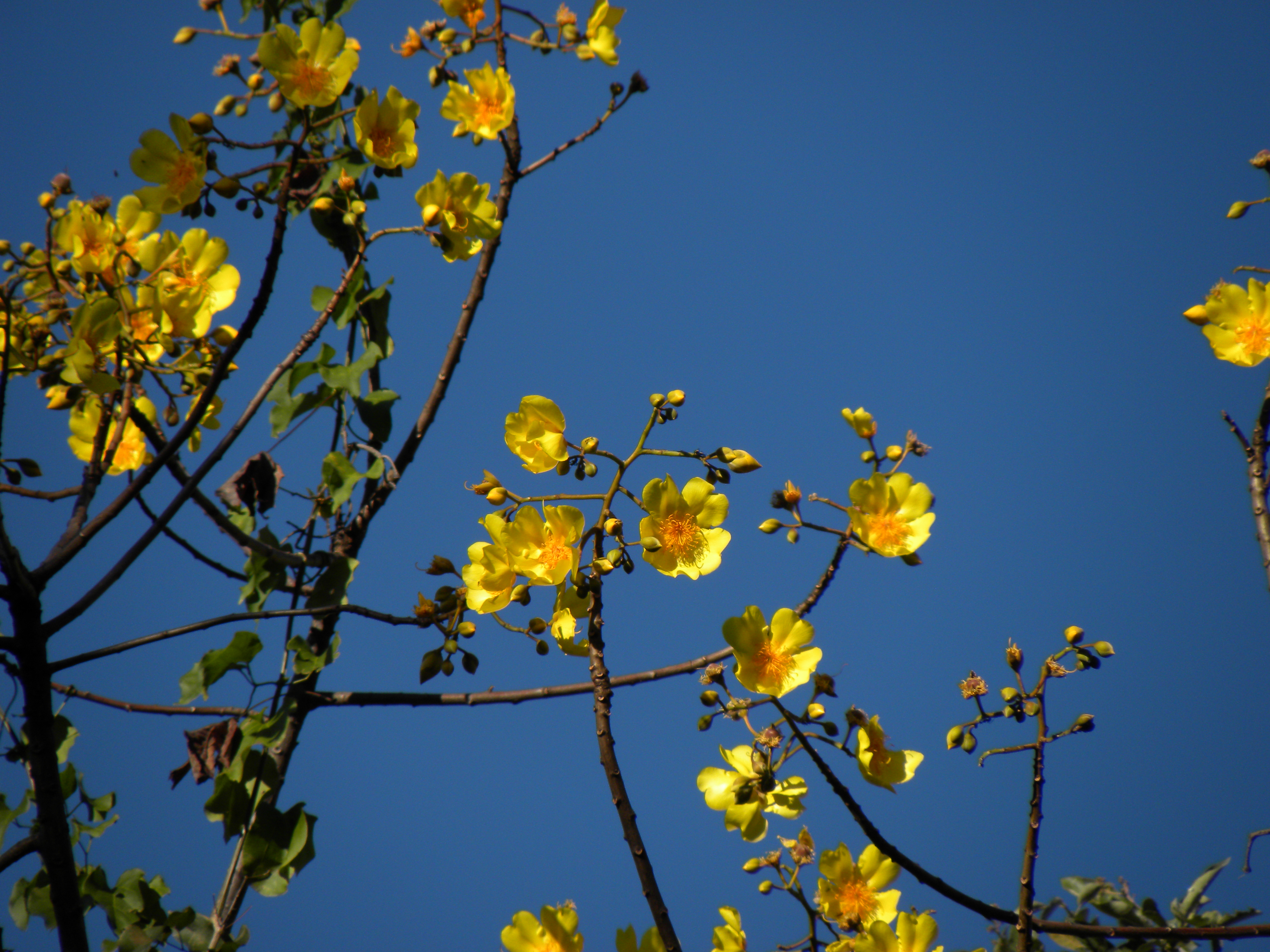
Cochlospermum vitifolium in Guanacaste, Costa Rica

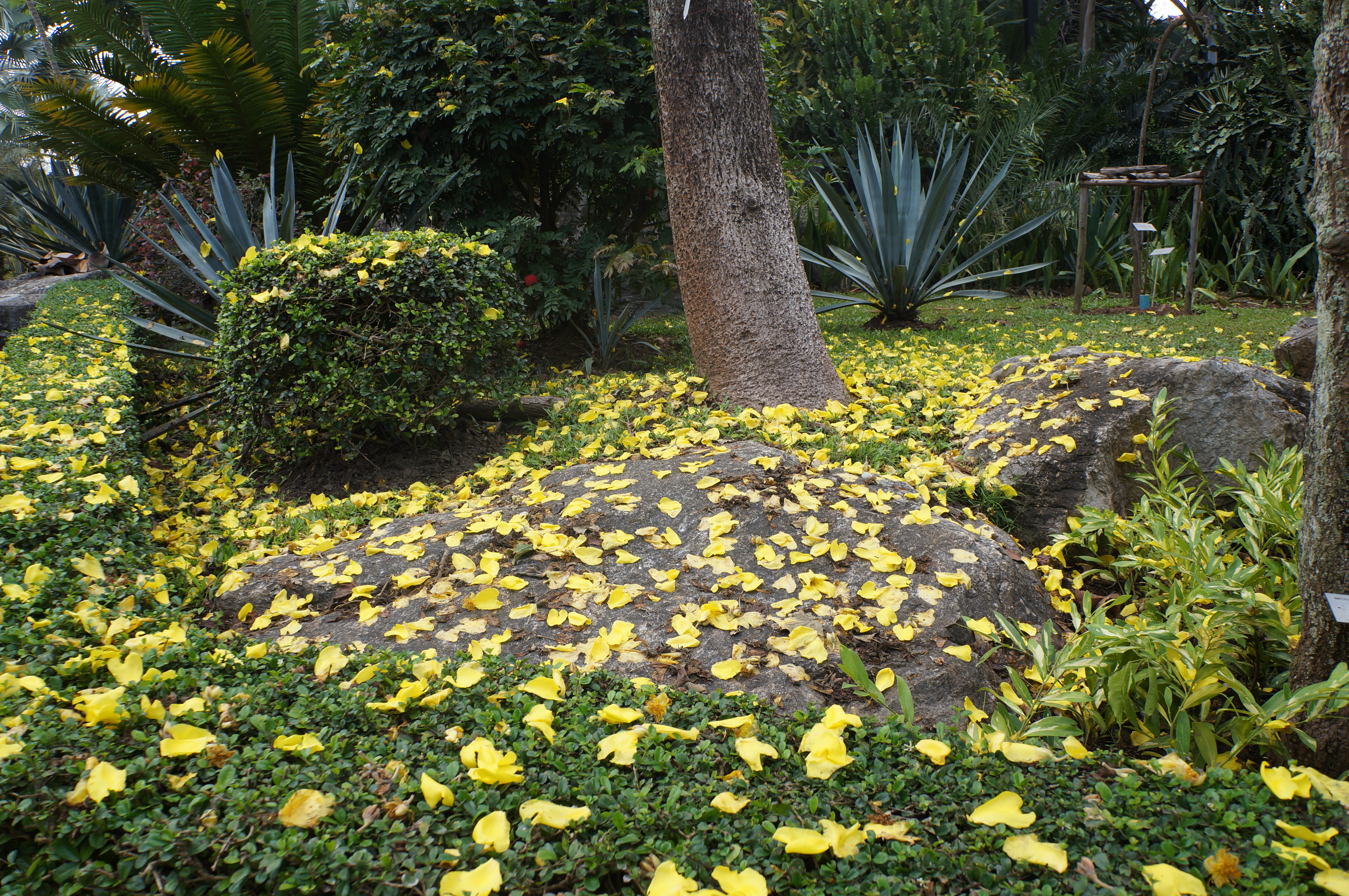
Fallen flowers Cochlospermum fraseri

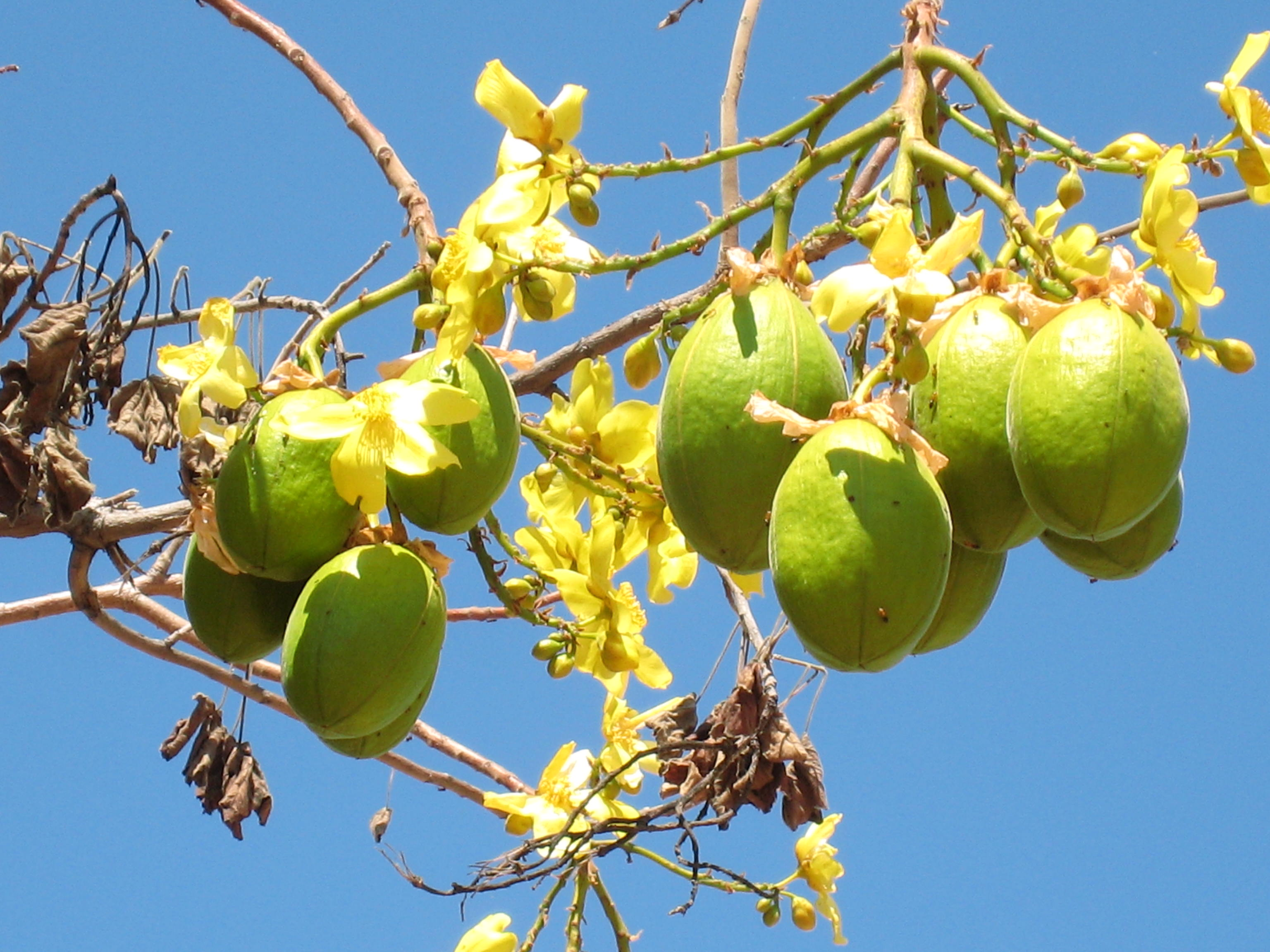
flowers & fruit Cochlospermum fraseri

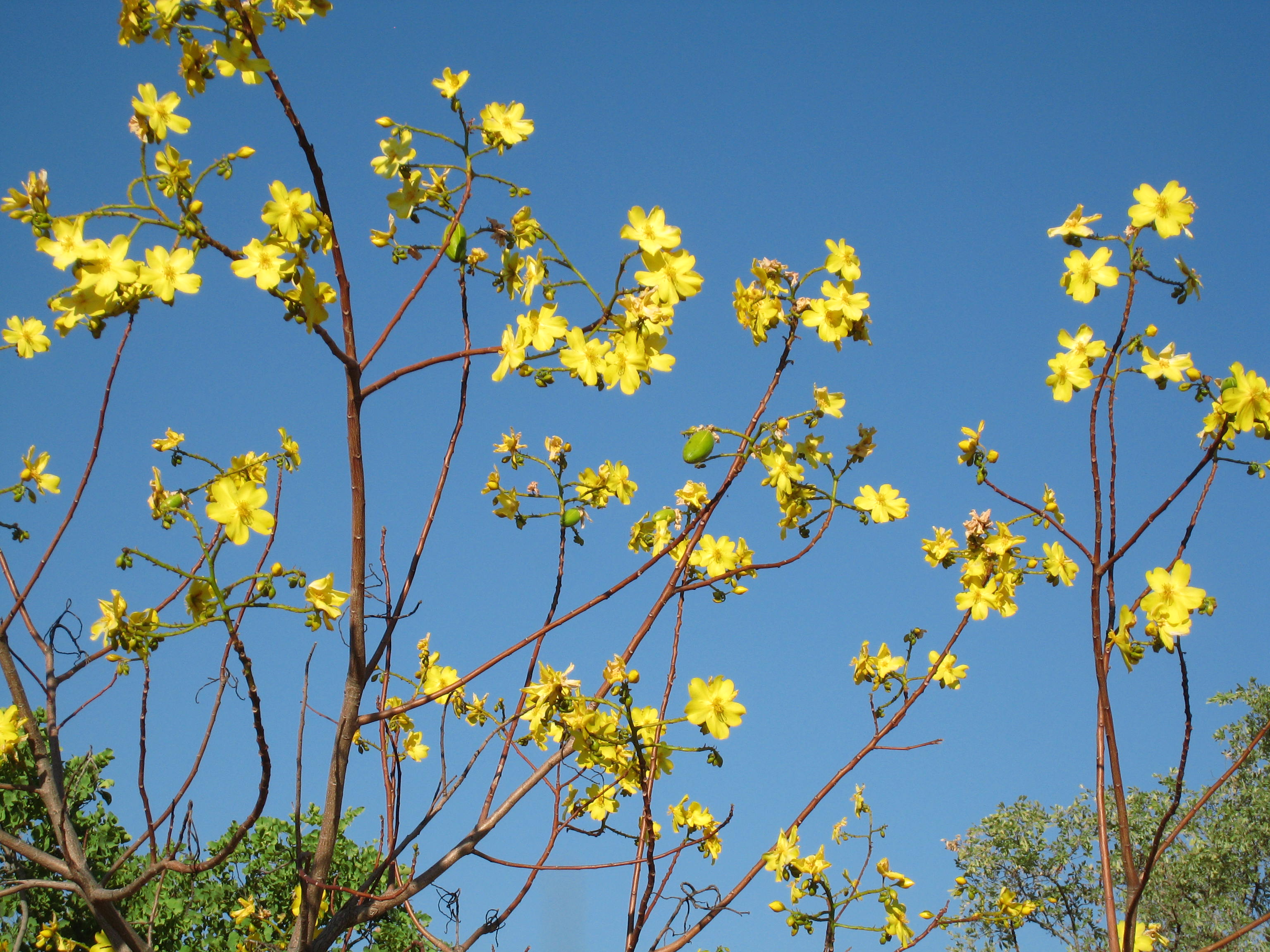
Cochlospermum fraseri deciduous when flowering
