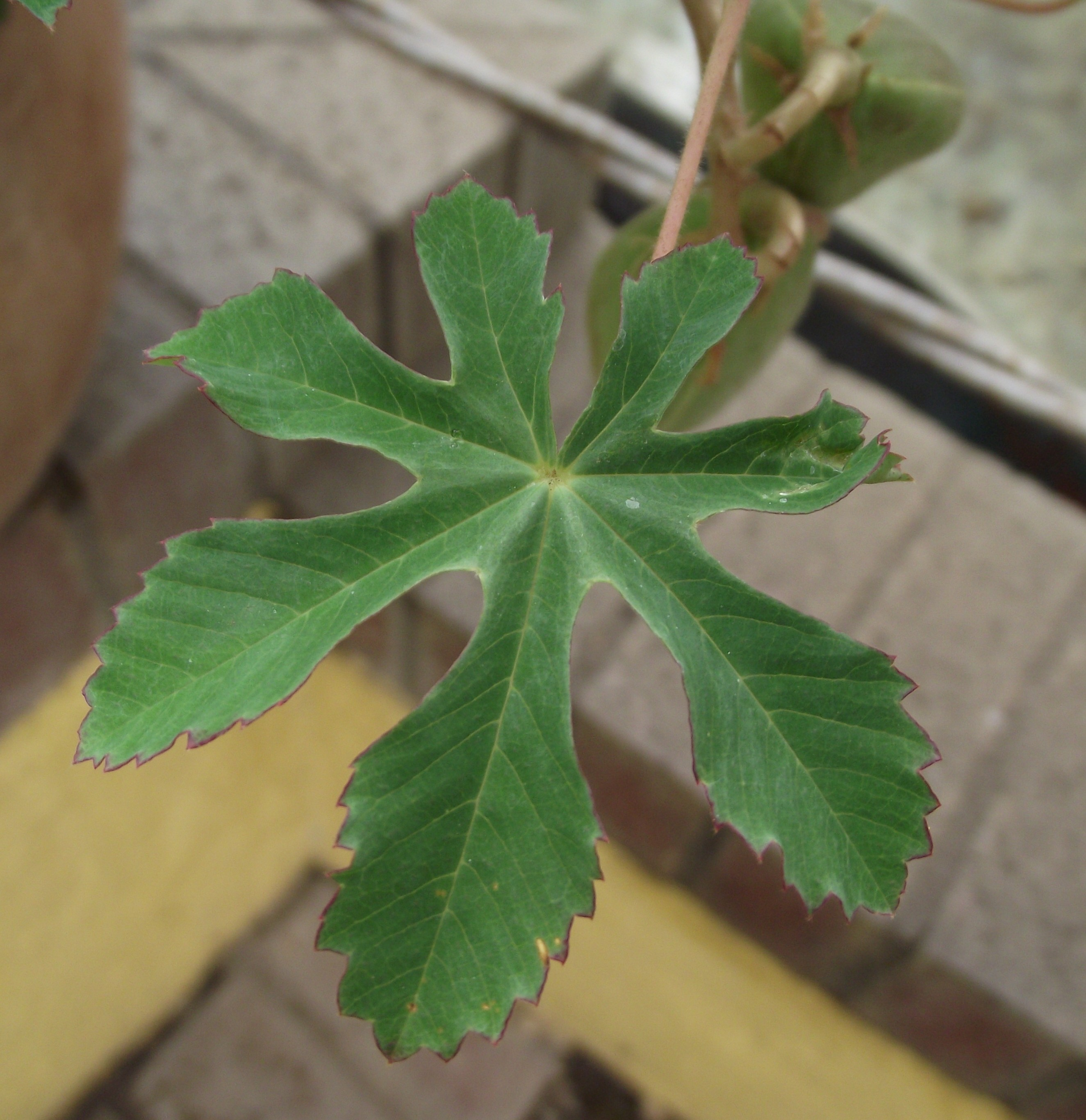

Conservation status
- Critically Imperiled (NatureServe)

Scientific classification
- Kingdom: Plantae
- Clade: Tracheophytes
- Clade: Angiosperms
- Clade: Eudicots
- Clade: Rosids
- Order: Malvales
- Family: Bixaceae
- Genus: Amoreuxia
- Species: A. gonzalezii

Binomial name
- Amoreuxia gonzalezii Sprague & Riley

= Amoreuxia gonzalezii =

Species of flowering plant

Amoreuxia gonzalezii is a rare species of flowering plant in the Bixaceae known by the common names Santa Rita mountain yellowshow, Santa Rita throwup weed, saiya and temaqui. It is native to Sonora in Mexico, its distribution extending just above the border into Arizona in the United States, where it occurs in the Santa Rita Mountains of Pima and Santa Cruz Counties. It has also been found in the States of Sinaloa and Jalisco to the south. It is also present in the Sierra de la Laguna of Baja California Sur.

This plant is a perennial herb with stems 25 to 35 centimeters long growing from a tuber-like rootstock. The leaves are divided deeply into 5 to 7 lobes, the blades dark green in color and 3 to 6 centimeters wide. The flower is 6 to 8 centimeters wide with five orange petals with dark red-brown spots at the bases. The flowers close in the daytime. Blooming occurs in July through September. The hanging fruit is up to 8 centimeters long and contains rounded brown seeds. This species is very similar to Amoreuxia palmatifida.

This plant grows in the transition between desert scrub and grassland. In the Santa Rita Mountains it grows on limestone talus and in Mexico it has been found on granite. Other plants in the habitat include Eysenhardtia, Erythrina, Cercidium floridum, Tecoma, Agave schottii, Heteropogon, Fouquieria, Calliandra, Opuntia spp., Krameria, Janusia gracilis, Agave palmeri and Hibiscus coulteri.
