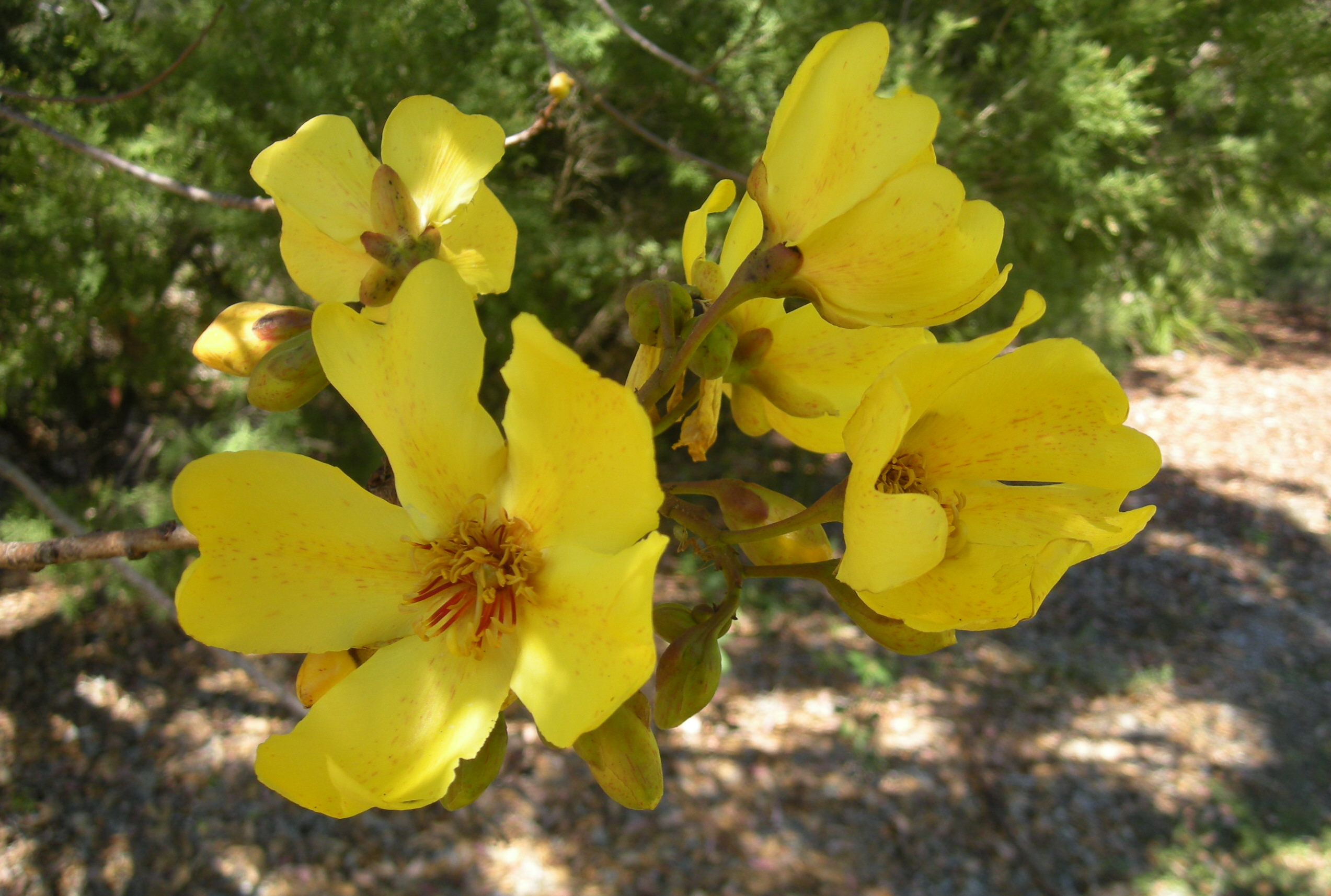

Conservation status
- Least Concern (TPWCA)

Scientific classification
- Kingdom: Plantae
- Clade: Tracheophytes
- Clade: Angiosperms
- Clade: Eudicots
- Clade: Rosids
- Order: Malvales
- Family: Bixaceae
- Genus: Cochlospermum
- Species: C. fraseri

Binomial name
- Cochlospermum fraseri Planch.
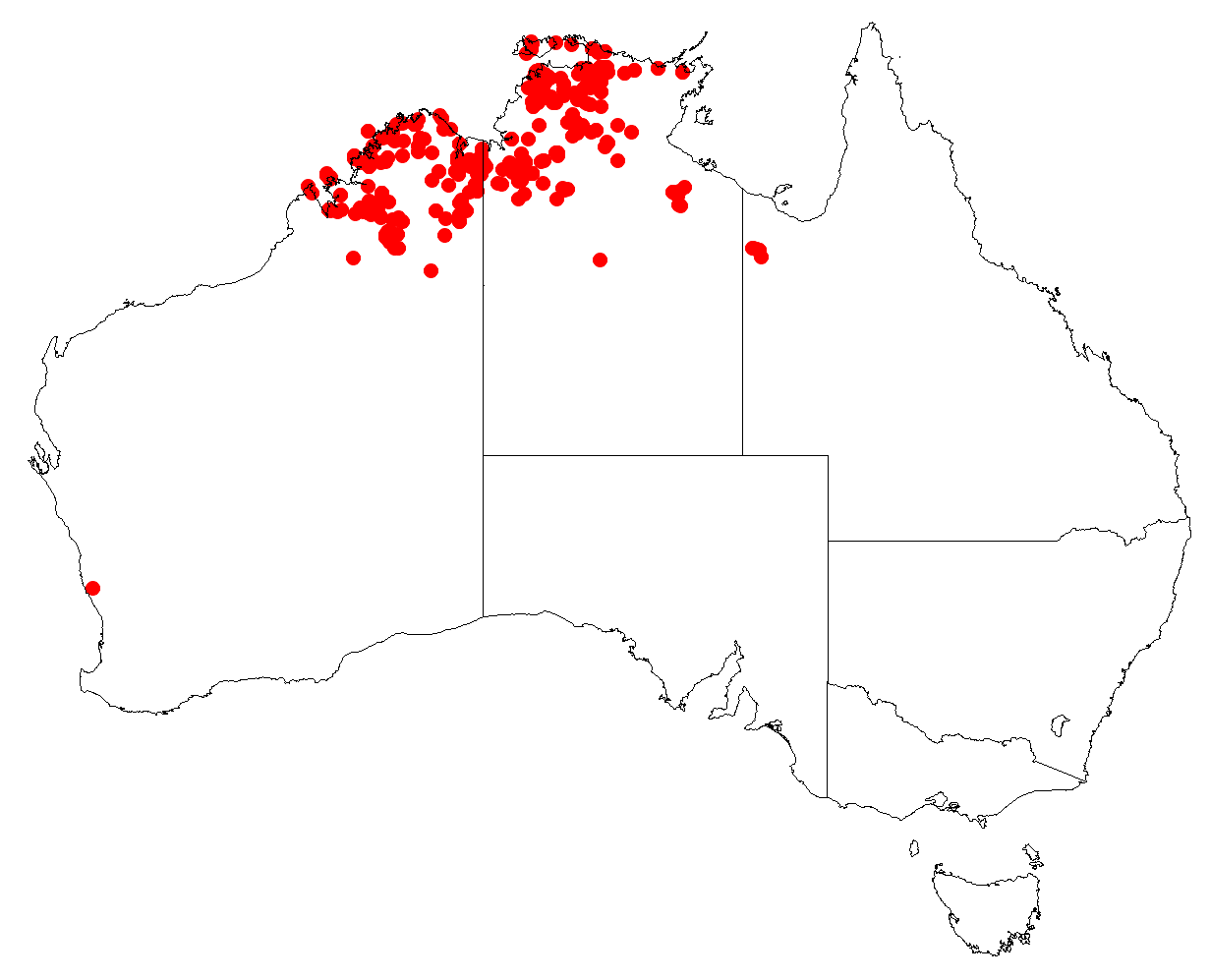
- Occurrence data from AVH

Synonyms
- Maximilianea fraseri (Planch.) Kuntze

= Cochlospermum fraseri =

Species of flowering plant

Cochlospermum fraseri is a tree in the family Bixaceae with common names cotton tree, kapok bush, and kapok tree. It is native to northwestern Australia from the Kimberly region of Western Australia to the northern parts of the Northern Territory.

== Description ==
Cochlospermum fraseri is a deciduous shrub or small tree which can grow to 7 m tall. It flowers from March to October, the inflorescence being a terminal panicle. The flowers are asymmetric, having five sepals in two whorls, with the outer two sepals being shorter than the inner three, and it has numerous stamens. The flowers often appear when the plant has no leaves. It fruits from June to March, with the fruit being a woody capsule having 3 to 5 valves. The seeds are surrounded by fluffy, "cottony" threads, giving rise to the common name kapok tree.

== Taxonomy ==
French botanist Jules Émile Planchon described this species in 1847 from Melville Island off the north coast of Australia. Two subspecies are recognised: subspecies fraseri, found mainly from Katherine to Melville Island, has smooth leaves and 2 mm-long bracts, and subspecies heteronemum, from Katherine west to the Ord River, has finely furred leaves and 40–58 mm-long bracts.

== Distribution and habitat ==
It is found in the bioregions of Central Kimberley, Dampierland, Gulf Fall and Uplands, Northern Kimberley, Ord Victoria Plain, Pine Creek, Victoria Bonaparte in the Northern Territory., and the bioregions of Central Kimberley, Dampierland, Great Sandy Desert, Northern Kimberley, Ord Victoria Plain, Victoria Bonaparte in Western Australia.

Cochlospermum fraseri grows in open eucalypt woodland on a variety of soils, including sands, gravelly soils, and heavy clay soils.

== Uses ==
The indigenous people of northern Australia would eat the flowers, either raw or cooked, and the roots of young plants. They also used to use the fluff from the seeds as body decoration.

This plant is a "calendar" plant of the Jawoyn people: flowering indicates when freshwater crocodiles are laying eggs, fruiting the time for collecting them.

== Gallery ==
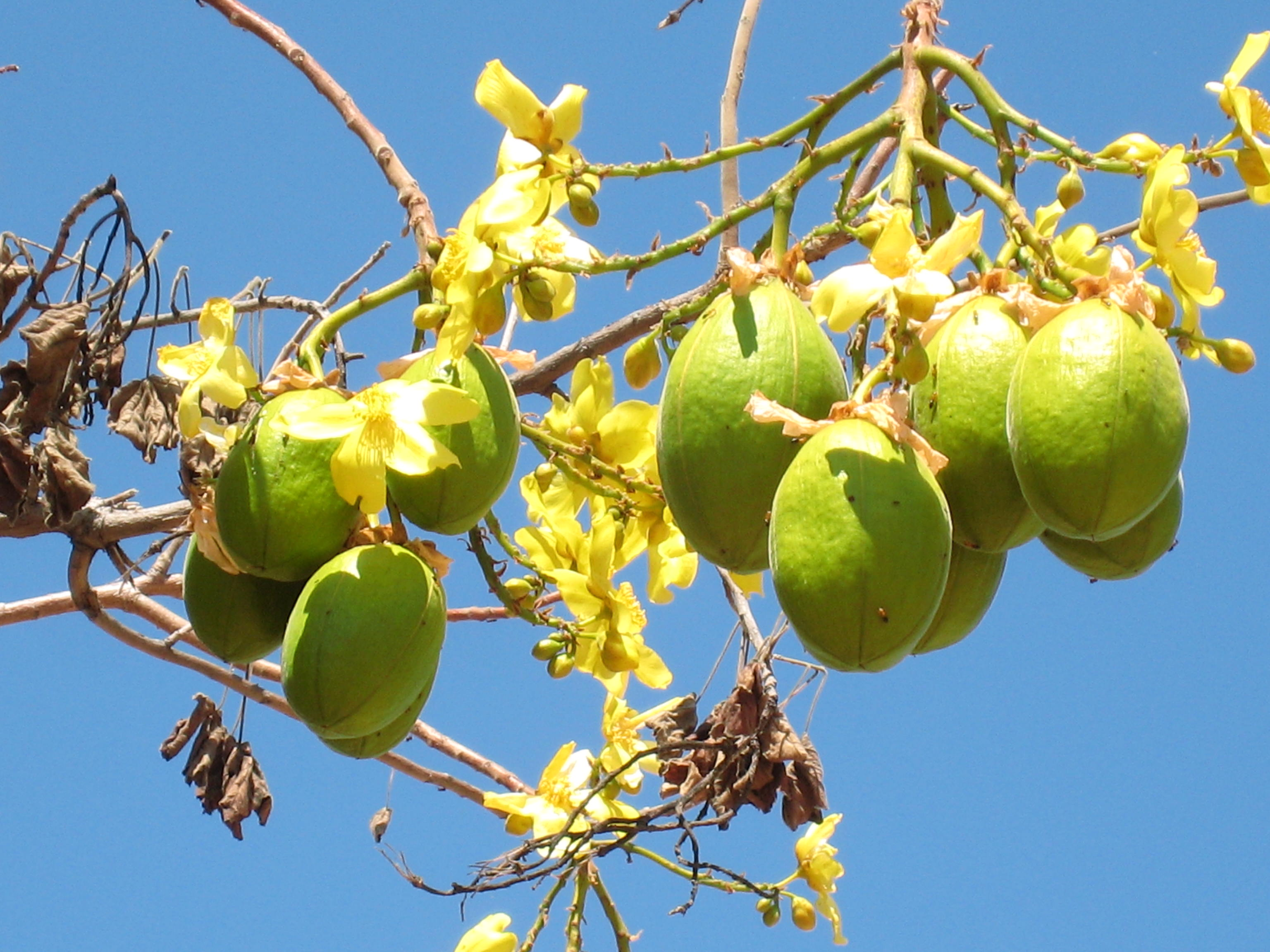

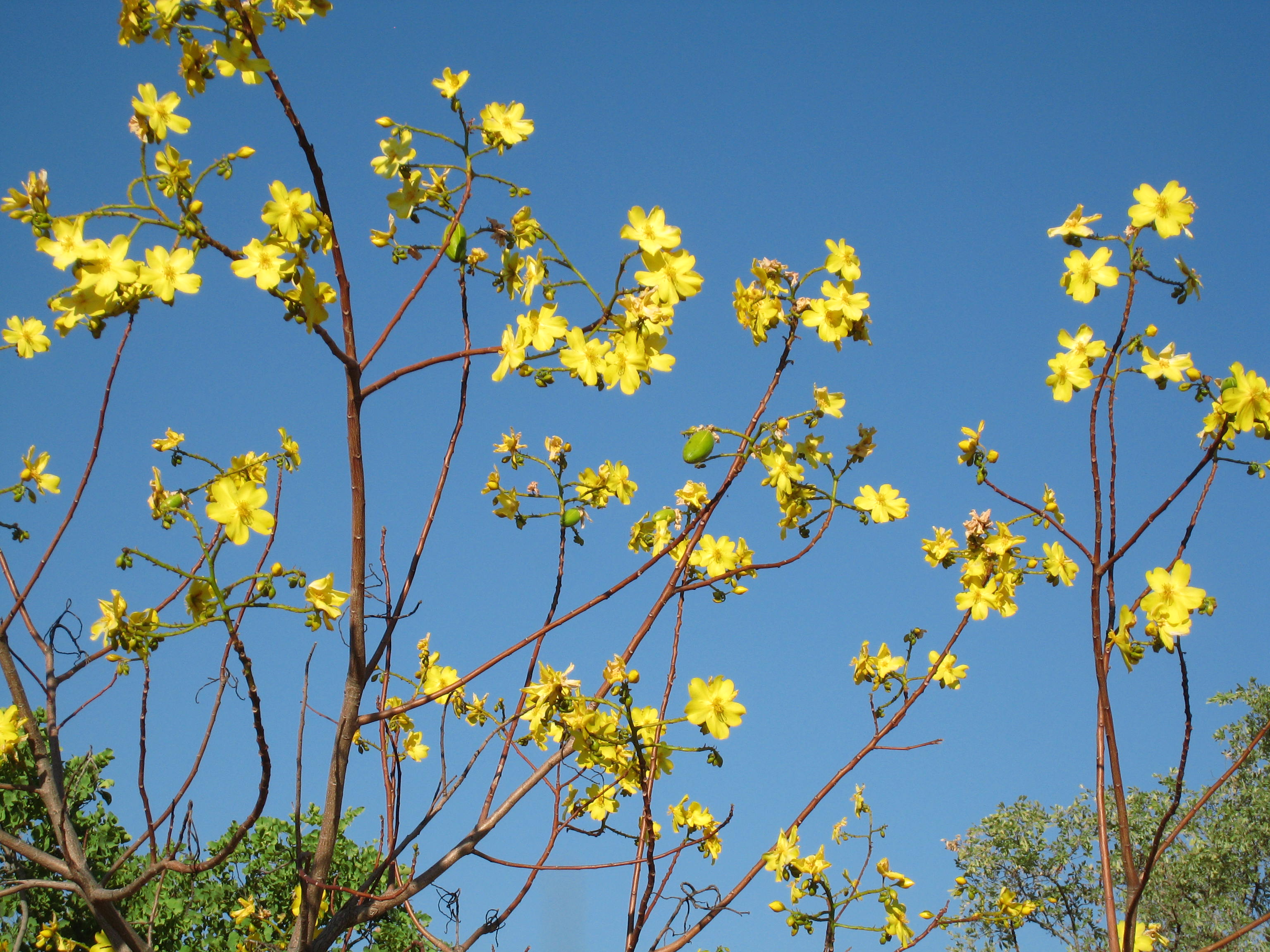

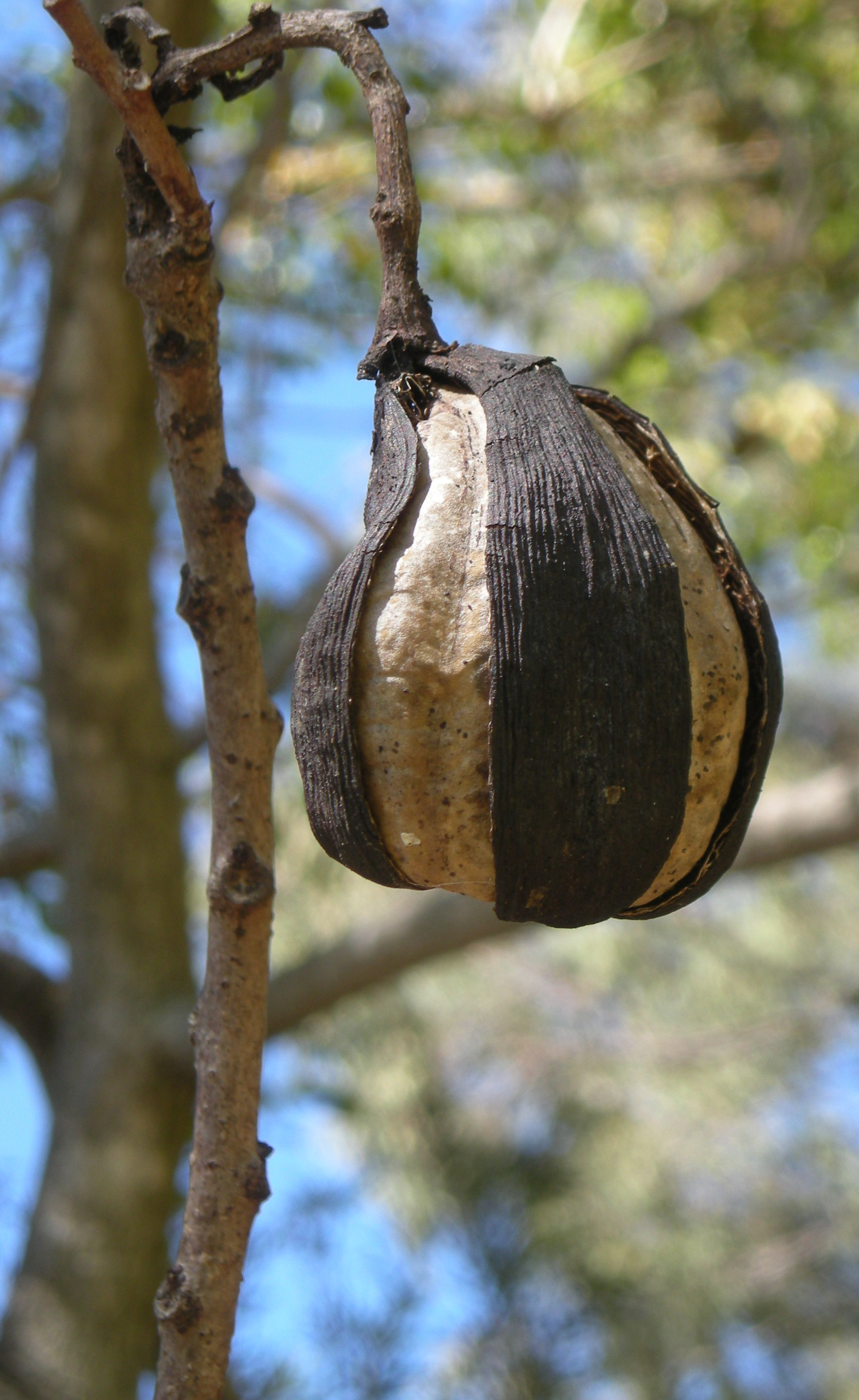
