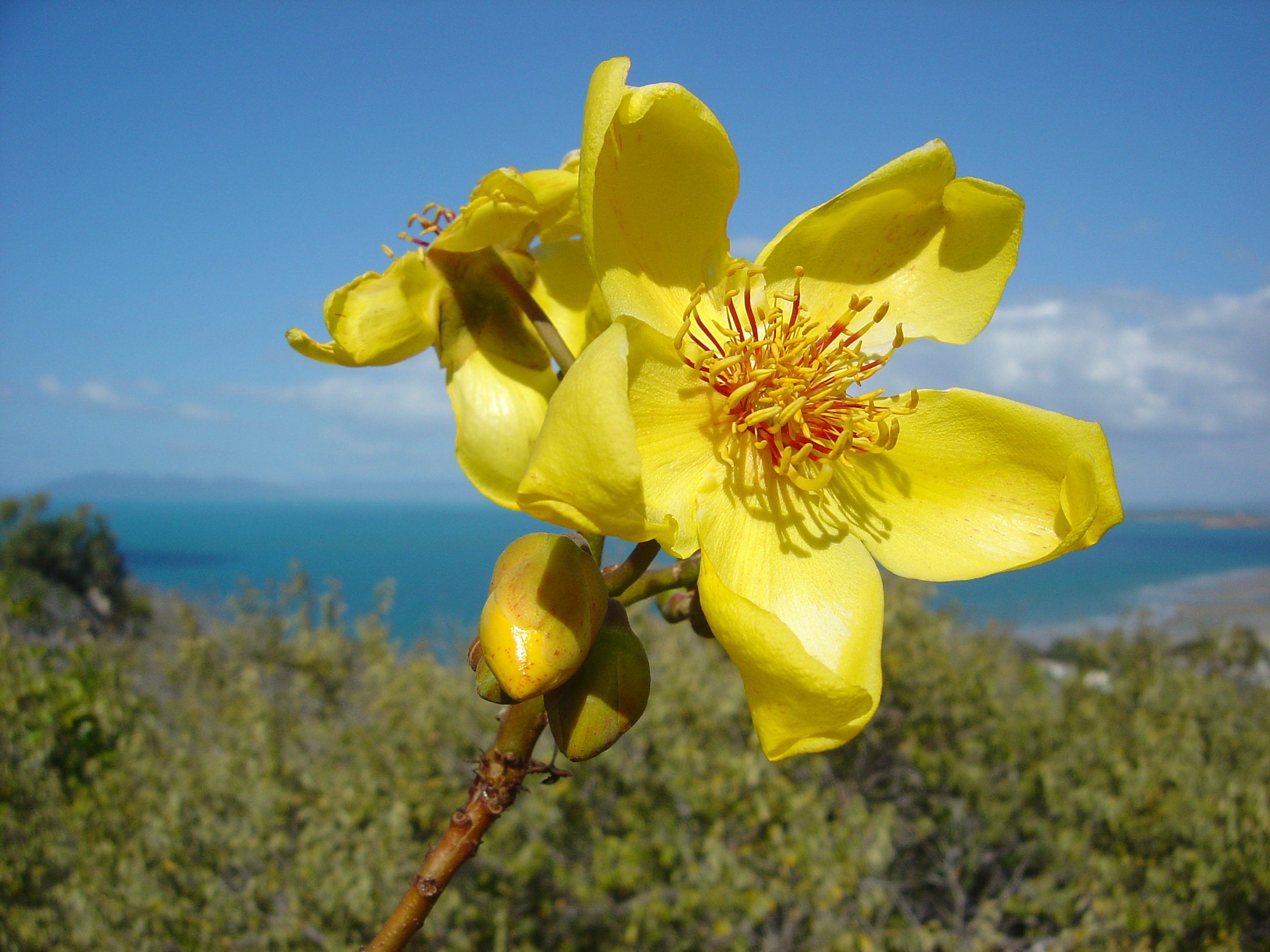

Scientific classification
- Kingdom: Plantae
- Clade: Tracheophytes
- Clade: Angiosperms
- Clade: Eudicots
- Clade: Rosids
- Order: Malvales
- Family: Bixaceae
- Genus: Cochlospermum
- Species: C. gillivraei

Binomial name
- Cochlospermum gillivraei Benth.

Synonyms
- Maximilianea gillivraei (Benth.) Kuntze

= Cochlospermum gillivraei =

Species of tree

Cochlospermum gillivraei is a tree in the family Bixaceae, with the common name kapok. It is native to Northern Australia.
