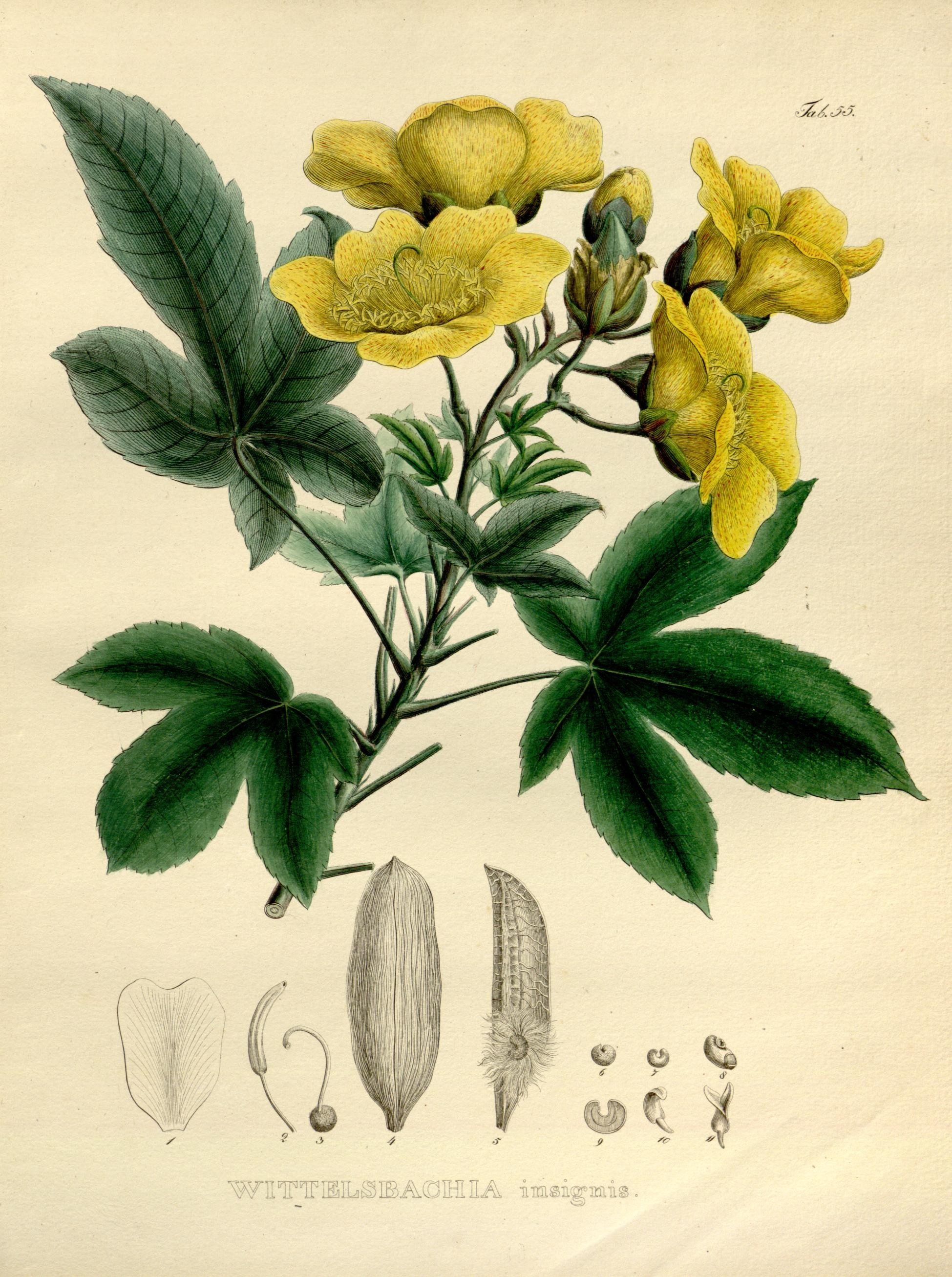

Scientific classification
- Kingdom: Plantae
- Clade: Tracheophytes
- Clade: Angiosperms
- Clade: Eudicots
- Clade: Rosids
- Order: Malvales
- Family: Bixaceae
- Genus: Cochlospermum
- Species: C. regium

Binomial name
- Cochlospermum regium (Mart. ex Schrank) Pilg.

Synonyms
- Maximilianea regia Schrank; Wittelsbachia insignis Mart. & Zucc.; Cochlospermum insigne A.St.-Hil.; Azeredia pernambucana Arruda ex Allemão; Maximilianea longirostrata Barb.Rodr.; Amoreuxia unipora Tiegh.; Cochlospermum trilobum Standl.

= Cochlospermum regium =

Species of flowering plant

Cochlospermum regium, also known as yellow cotton tree (Portuguese: Algodao do cerrado; Thai: สุพรรณิการ์, RTGS: suphannika), is a flowering plant that has its origins in the Cerrado tropical savanna of South America (Bolivia, Brazil, Paraguay), but now it is also common in Southeast Asia.

Cochlospermum regium is a small tree. Its yellow and bright flowers have antioxidant properties. In Thailand it is the provincial flower of Nakhon Nayok, Sara Buri, Buri Ram, Suphan Buri and Uthai Thani Provinces.

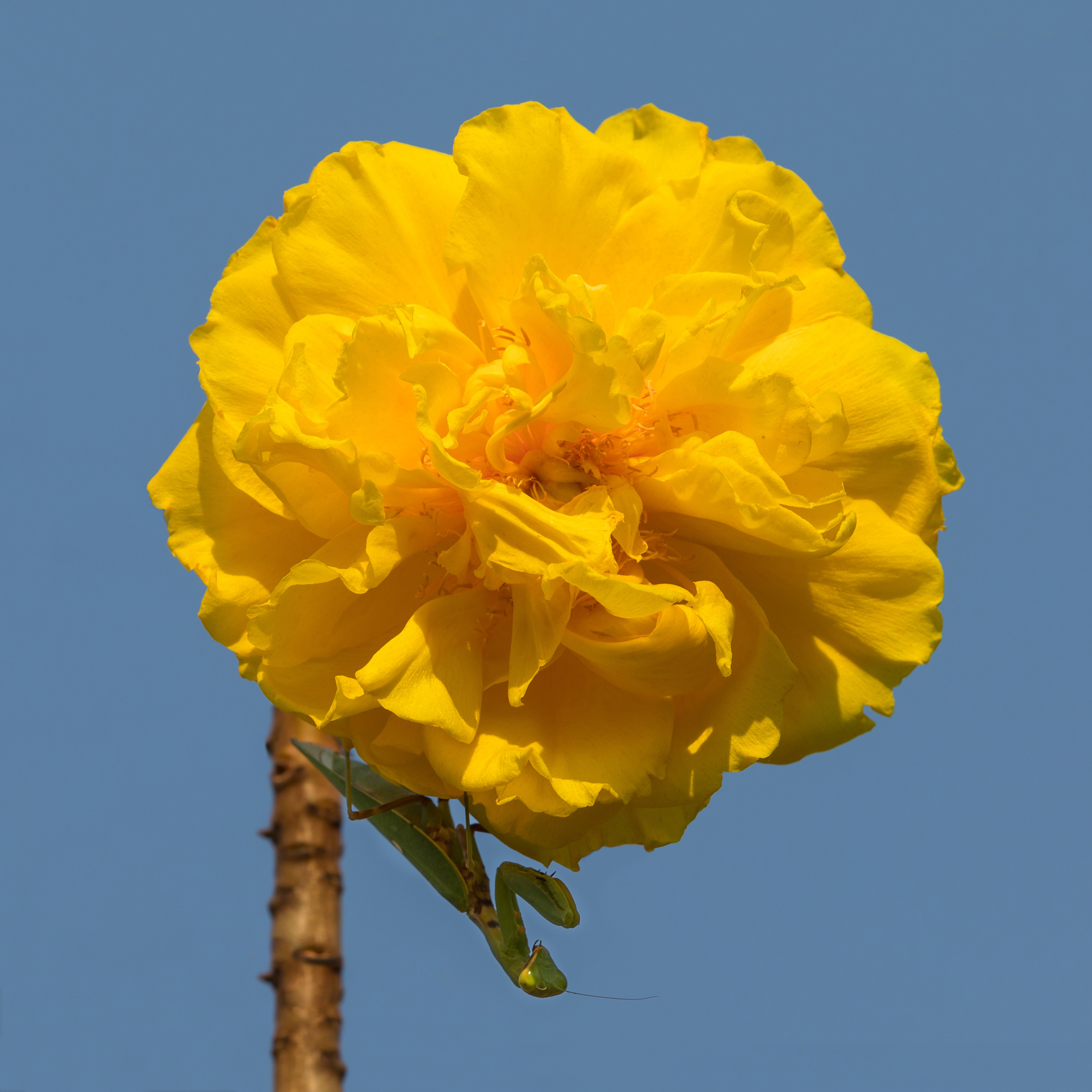
Cochlospermum regium flower with praying mantis, in Laos

== See also ==
- List of plants of Cerrado vegetation of Brazil
