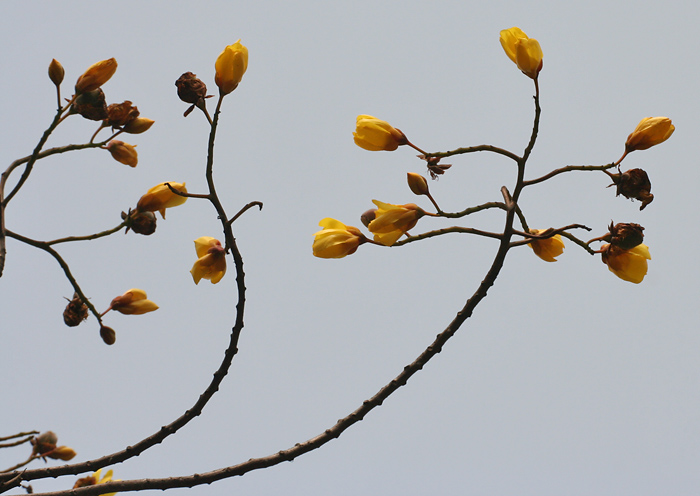
- Cochlospermum religiosum blossoms

Scientific classification
- Kingdom: Plantae
- Clade: Tracheophytes
- Clade: Angiosperms
- Clade: Eudicots
- Clade: Rosids
- Order: Malvales
- Family: Bixaceae
- Genus: Cochlospermum
- Species: C. religiosum

Binomial name
- Cochlospermum religiosum (L.) Alston

Synonyms
- List: Bombax gossypium L.; Bombax religiosum L.; Cochlospermum balicum Boerl.; Cochlospermum gossypium DC.; Maximilianea gossypium Kuntze; Wittelsbachia gossypium Mart. & Zucc.

= Cochlospermum religiosum =

Species of flowering plant

Cochlospermum religiosum is a flowering plant from the tropical region of Southeast Asia and the Indian subcontinent. It is a small tree growing to a height of 7.5 m (25 ft) usually found in dry deciduous forests. The name religiosum derives from the fact that the flowers are used as temple offerings. It is also known as silk-cotton tree because the capsules containing the seeds have a fluffy cotton-like substance similar to kapok. Another common name is buttercup tree because its yellow and bright flowers look like large-sized buttercups.

In Theravada Buddhism, this plant is said to have been used as the tree for achieving enlightenment, or Bodhi, by the nineteenth Buddha, who was named "Siddhaththa" (Sinhala script: "සිද්ධත්ථ"). The plant is known as කිණිහිරියා (Kinihiriyaa) in the Sinhala language, and කණිකාර (Kanikaara) in Sanskrit.

== Gallery ==
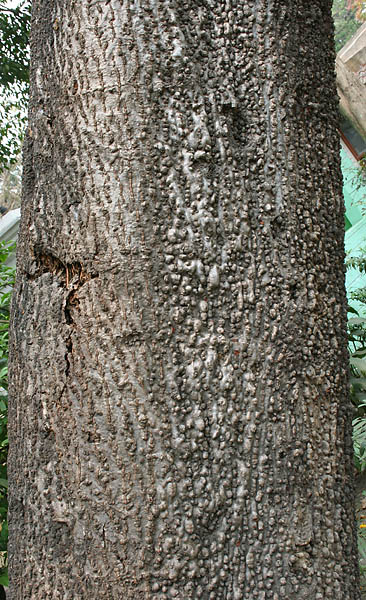
Trunk in Kolkata, West Bengal, India.

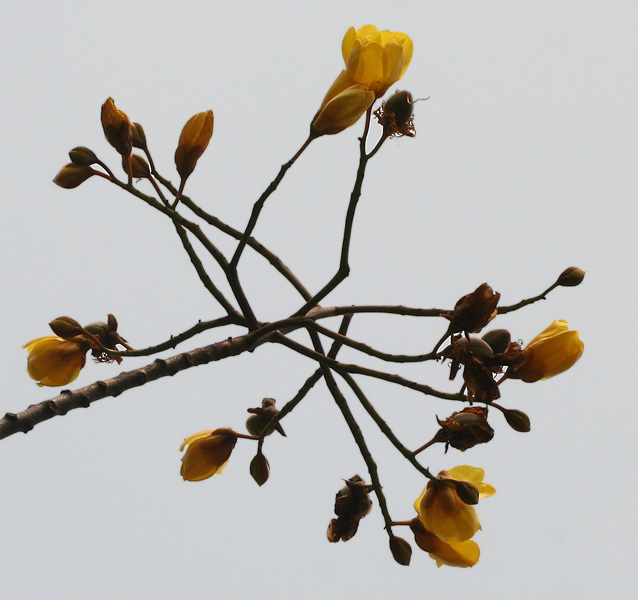
Flowers

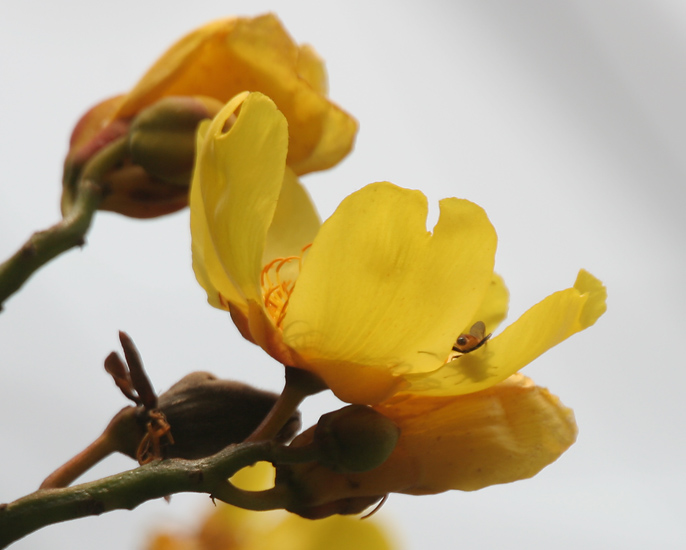
Detail of the flowers

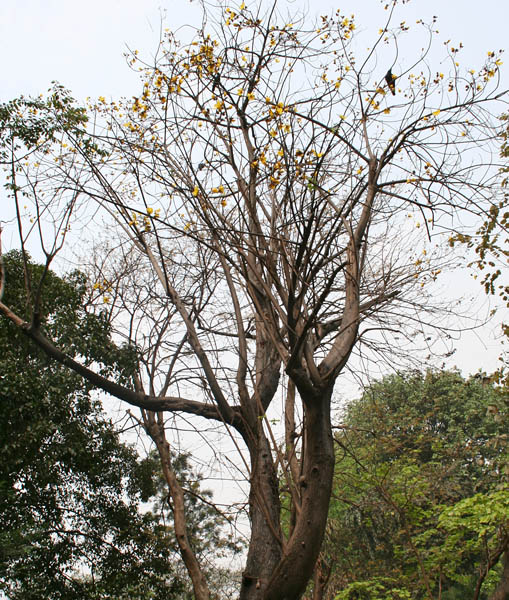
Flowering tree

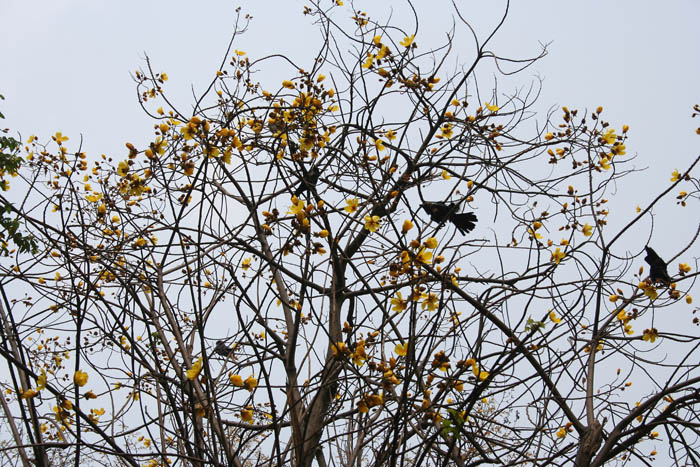
Flowering canopy

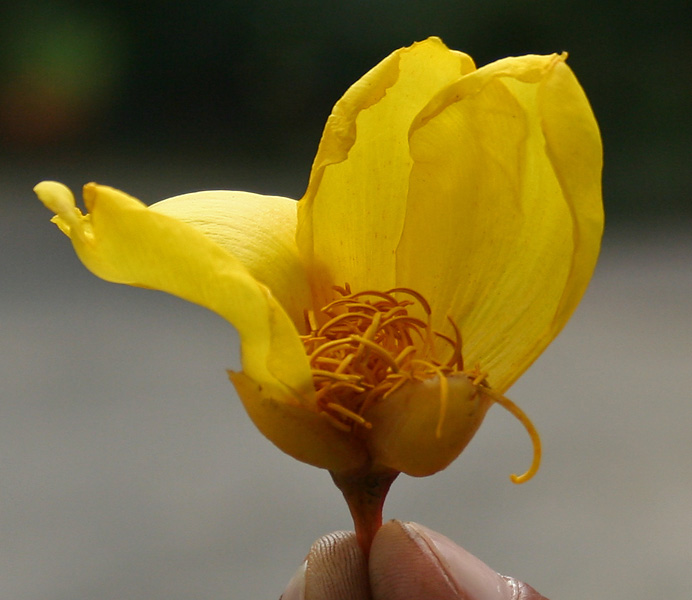
Detail of a flower

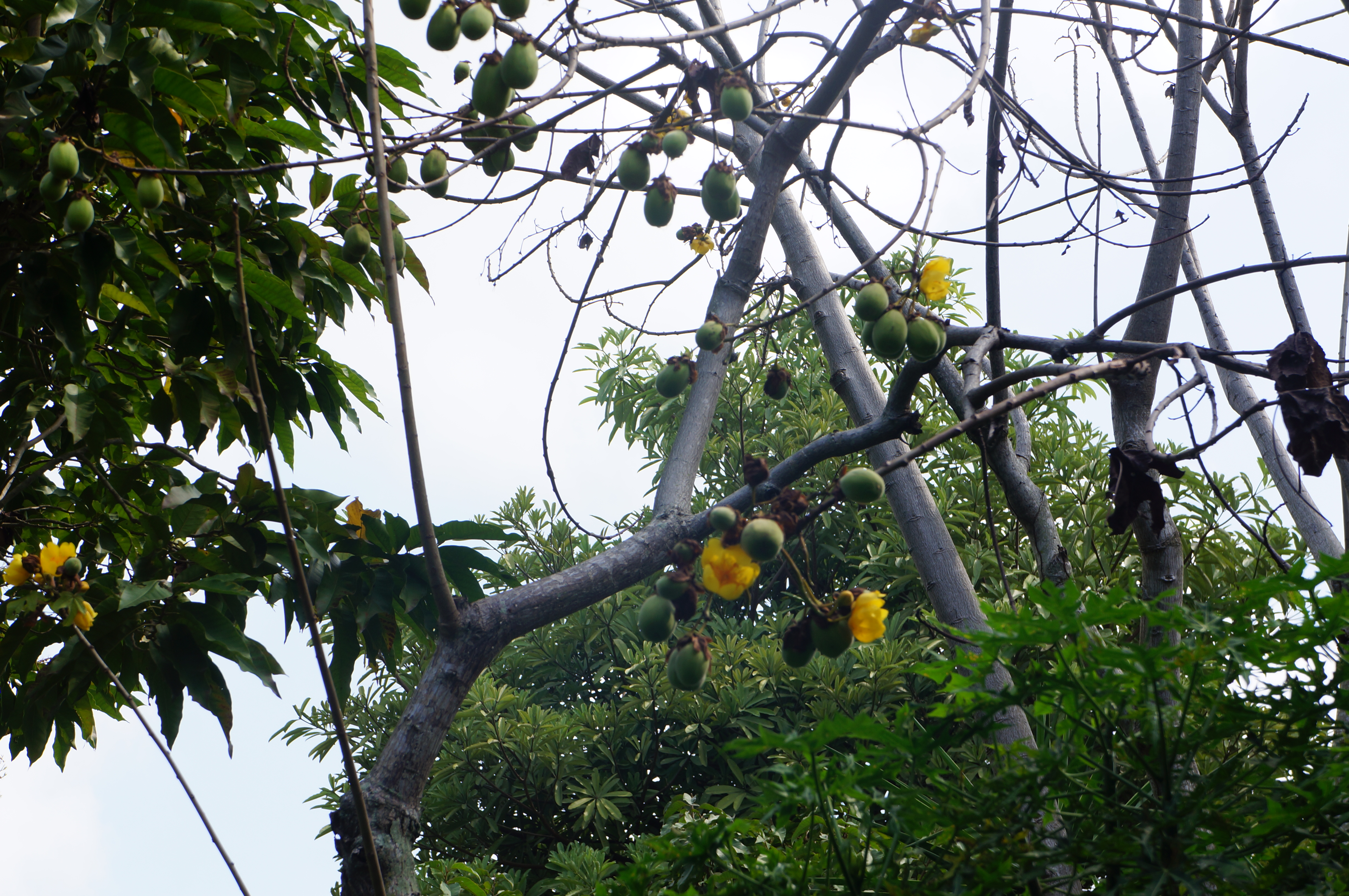
Fruit and Flower

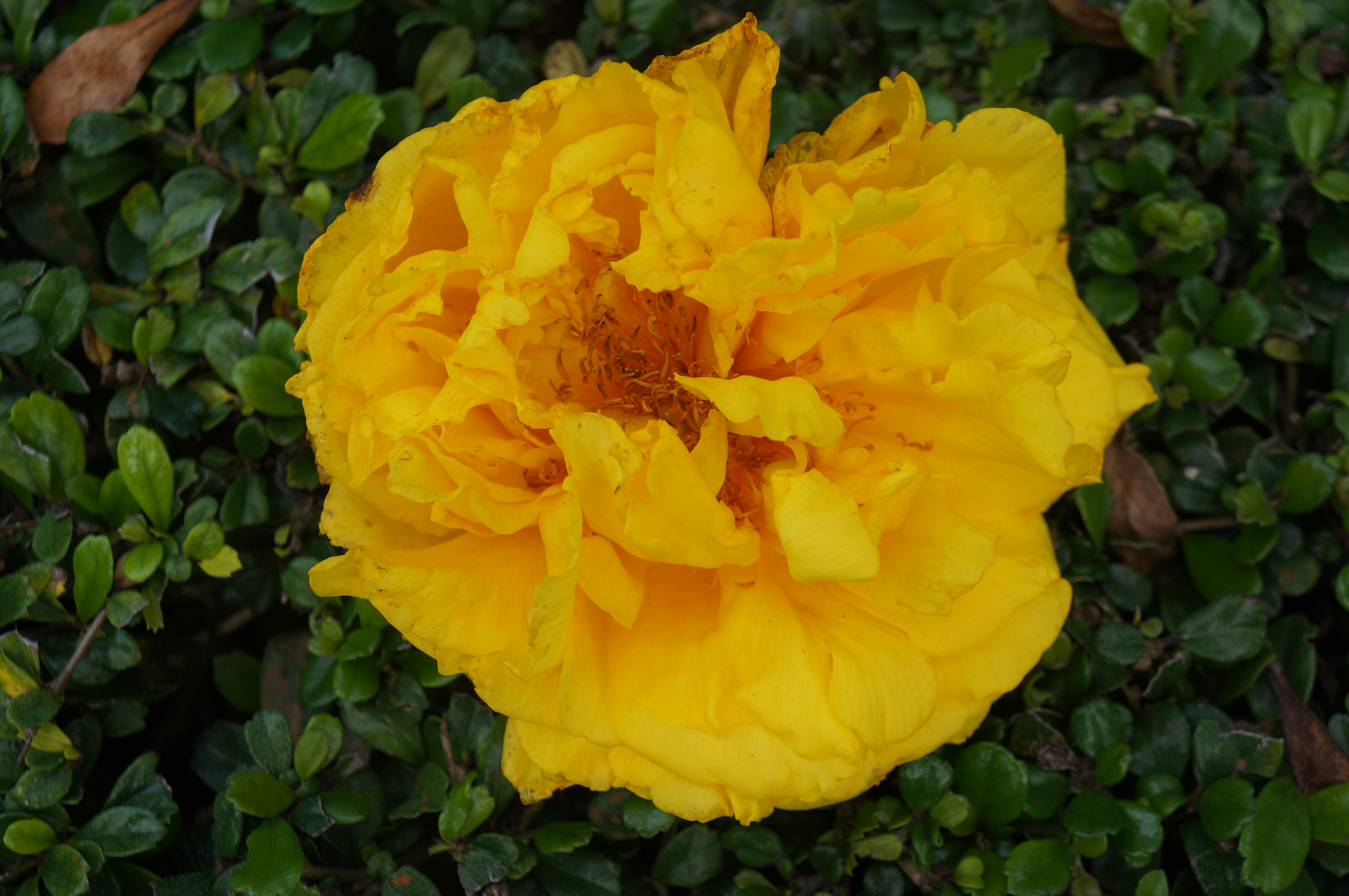
Flower
