= Diogo Soares =

Diogo Soares may refer to:

- Diogo Soares (explorer), 16th century Portuguese explorer
- Diogo Soares (gymnast) (born 2002), Brazilian artistic gymnast
