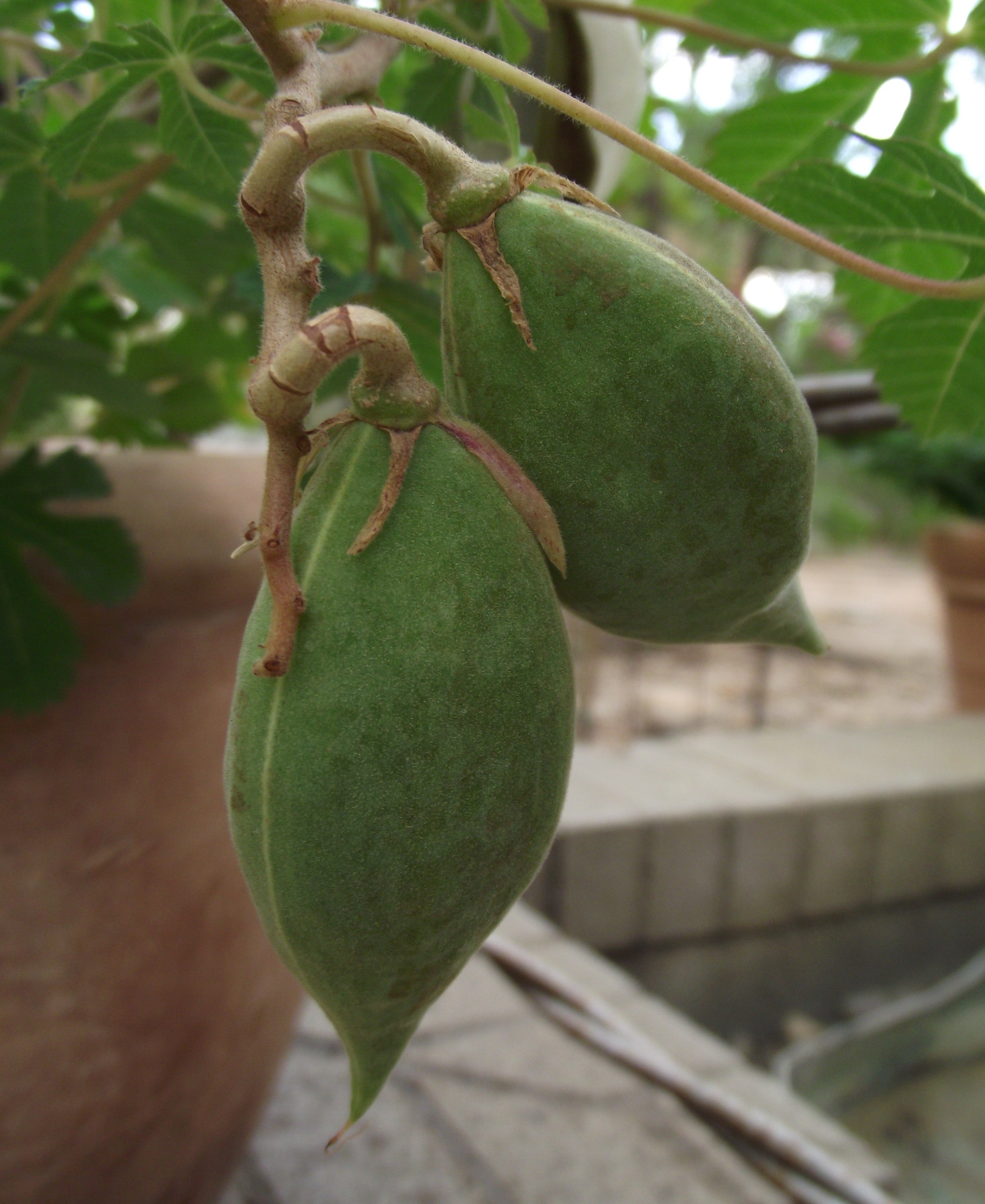
- Amoreuxia gonzalezii fruits

Scientific classification
- Kingdom: Plantae
- Clade: Tracheophytes
- Clade: Angiosperms
- Clade: Eudicots
- Clade: Rosids
- Order: Malvales
- Family: Bixaceae
- Genus: Amoreuxia; Moc. & Sessé ex DC

Synonyms
- Euryanthe Cham. & Schltdl.

= Amoreuxia =

Genus of flowering plants

Amoreuxia is a genus of flowering plants in the achiote family, Bixaceae. It was formerly placed in the family Cochlospermaceae. Members of the genus are commonly known as yellowshow. They are native to Mexico, Central America, Colombia, Peru, Curaçao, and the southwestern United States.

Species

1. Amoreuxia gonzalezii Sprague & L.Riley – Santa Rita Mountain yellowshow - Sonora, Sinaloa, Jalisco, southern Arizona
2. Amoreuxia malvifolia A.Gray - Chihuahua, Durango
3. Amoreuxia palmatifida Moc. & Sessé ex DC. – Mexican yellowshow - Mexico, Central America, Colombia, Arizona, New Mexico
4. Amoreuxia wrightii A.Gray – Wright's yellowshow - Curaçao, Peru, Chihuahua, Durango, Coahuila, Nuevo León, San Luis Potosí, Tamaulipas, Campeche, Yucatán, Quintana Roo, Campeche, Texas
