= Diogo Soares (explorer) =

Portuguese navigator and explorer

Diogo Soares de Albergaria (Spanish: Diego Suarez de Albergaria), also known as Diego Soares de Melo, Diego Suarez de Melo and the "Galego", was a 16th-century Portuguese navigator and explorer.

== India ==
Soares arrived to India c. 1538, where he was a known murderer and pirate. Estêvão da Gama, by then Governor of Goa, issued a warrant for Soares's arrest, but Soares was later granted a pardon by Da Gama's successor, Martim Afonso de Sousa, who was a friend of Soares. Under De Sousa's rule, Soares commanded expeditions while at the same time continuing his pirate activities near Portuguese Mozambique.

== Madagascar ==
At the beginning of the 16th century, a Portuguese squadron of 13 ships crisscrossed the Indian Ocean. One of these ships went adrift, and its captain, Diego Diaz, was therefore the first European to discover the Big Island on 10 August 1500. In February 1506, Admiral Herman Suarez recognized the place and so Antomabokala, former capital of Ankarana, acquired its name of Diego Suarez, which comes from the contraction of the first name of the captain and the name of the Admiral. In 1635, the bay was mentioned for the first time under this name by the French pilot Berthelot, author of an oriental map of Africa and Madagascar. In 1824, the bay was explored by the English hydrographer Owen, then in 1833, Captain Bigeault, commandant of La Nièvre, traveled the North East coast to carry out hydrographic surveys. But this harbor, which is perfectly situated on the route to India, does not fail to interest the European nations and by the Franco-Malagasy treaty of 17 December 1885, France is authorized to occupy Diego Suarez.

== Burma ==
Soares landed in Portuguese Malacca in 1547, driven by the weather. There he stayed under the orders of Tabinshwehti, King of the Burmese of the Toungoo dynasty. There, Soares became wealthy, worth four million in jewels and other valuables, had a pension of 200,000 ducats yearly, was called the king's brother, and was supreme governor of the kingdom and general in chief of the army.

== Burmese–Siamese War (1548) ==
During the Burmese–Siamese War (1547–1549), Soares commanded a force of five captains and 180 professional mercenaries, he also led the failed invasion and siege of Tapuram, which ended after five months after 120,000 Peguans deserted when their leader Xemindoo (Smim Htaw) rebelled in their native Pegu, but also as a revenge for the mistreatment by Soares, who was his general in chief.

== Death ==
While still King Tabinshwehti's general, Soares tried to take off by force the daughter of a rich merchant, in the process he killed the groom and others who came to her rescue, and the bride committed suicide to avoid the dishonour. Soon afterwards, Smim Sawhtut (who killed Tabinshwehti and who was a general serving under him), handed Soares to the city of the disgraced bride, there the people stoned Soares to death, plundered his house, and as much less treasure was found, he was believed to have buried the rest. The episode of his death is described in the book Peregrinação by Fernão Mendes Pinto.

While Alexander Hamilton, an early 18th century Scottish traveller, mentioned the 'King of Pegu' (Smim Sawhtut) asked for Diogo to be dragged by an elephant until the skin off his bones were no more and all Portuguese in the vicinity to be wiped out, only three survivors managed to flee, reported to reach all the way in Portuguese Malacca.

== Eponym ==
In 1963, botanist René Paul Raymond Capuron published a genus of flowering plants belonging to the family Bixaceae, from Madagascar as Diegodendron and named in his honour and due to his links with the island.

== See also ==
- Burmese–Siamese War (1547–49)
