= Diegodendron =

Conservation status
- Vulnerable (IUCN 3.1)

Scientific classification
- Kingdom: Plantae
- Clade: Tracheophytes
- Clade: Angiosperms
- Clade: Eudicots
- Clade: Rosids
- Order: Malvales
- Family: Bixaceae
- Genus: Diegodendron; Capuron
- Species: D. humbertii

Binomial name
- Diegodendron humbertii Capuron

Genus of plants

Diegodendron is a monotypic genus of flowering plants belonging to the family Bixaceae. The only known species is Diegodendron humbertii.

Its native range is Madagascar.

The genus and species were circumscribed by René Paul Raymond Capuron in Adansonia, n.s., vol.3 on page 385-386 in 1963.

The genus name of Diegodendron is in honour of Diego Suárez also known as Diego Soares de Melo, Diego Suarez de Melo and the "Galego", who was a 16th-century Portuguese navigator and explorer (plus dendron Greek for tree).
