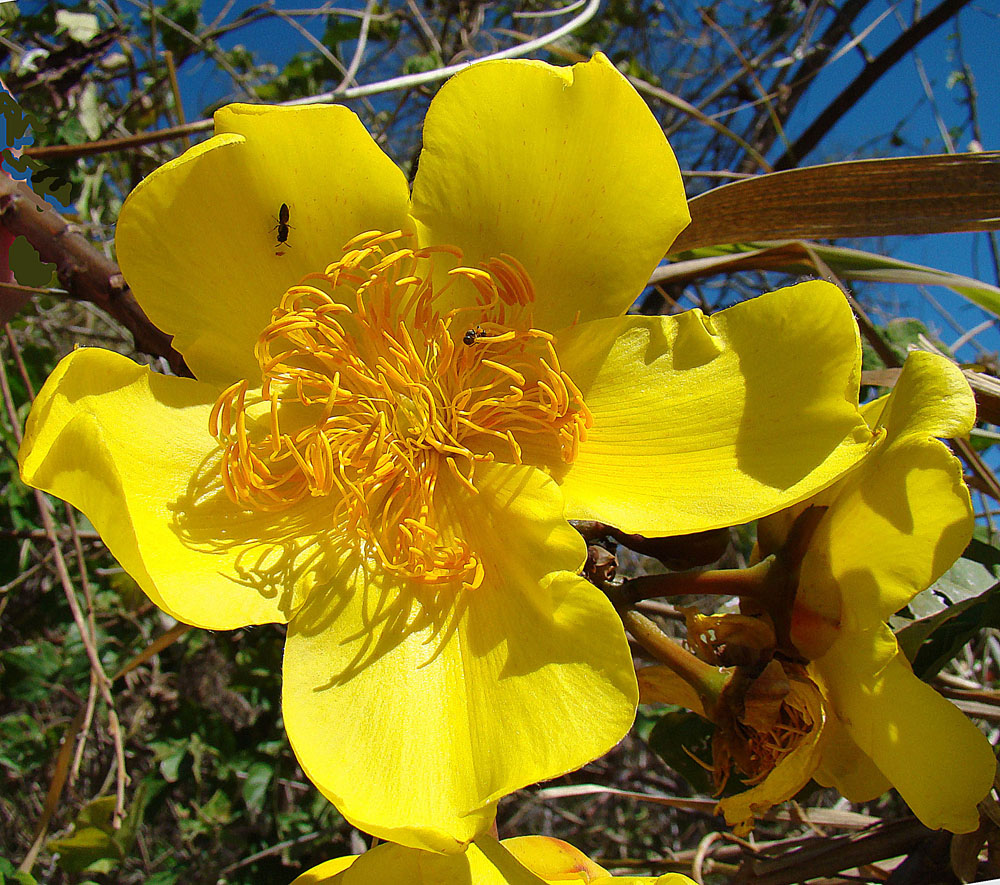

Conservation status
- Least Concern (IUCN 3.1)

Scientific classification
- Kingdom: Plantae
- Clade: Tracheophytes
- Clade: Angiosperms
- Clade: Eudicots
- Clade: Rosids
- Order: Malvales
- Family: Bixaceae
- Genus: Cochlospermum
- Species: C. vitifolium

Binomial name
- Cochlospermum vitifolium (Willd.) Spreng.

Synonyms
- Bombax vitifolium Willd.; Cochlospermum codinae Eichler; Cochlospermum hibiscoides Kunth; Cochlospermum hibiscoides var. dasycarpum Triana & Planch.; Cochlospermum hibiscoides var. gymnocarpum Triana & Planch.; Cochlospermum luetzeiburgii Pilg.; Cochlospermum luetzelburgii Pilg.; Cochlospermum serratifolium DC.; Cochlospermum triphyllum (S.F.Blake) Pittier; Mahurea speciosa Choisy; Maximilianea codinae (Eichler) Kuntze; Maximilianea hibiscodes (Kunth) Kuntze; Maximilianea triphylla S.F.Blake; Maximilianea vitifolia (Willd.) Krug & Urb.; Wittelsbachia vitifolia (Willd.) Mart. & Zucc.; Wittelsbachia vitifolia (Willd.) Mart. in Mart. & Zucc.

= Cochlospermum vitifolium =

Species of tree

Cochlospermum vitifolium or rosa amarilla is a tree belonging to the family Bixaceae. It reaches up to 12 metres (40 ft) in height and its leaves are deciduous. Its flowers are showy, yellow, solitary, and large, up to 10 centimetres (4 in) across. They resemble roses but do not belong to the same family. It inhabits the dry jungles of southern Mexico to Central America from sea level to 1,200 metres (3,900 ft) elevation. Its wood produces a yellow-orange dye used for dyeing cotton clothes.

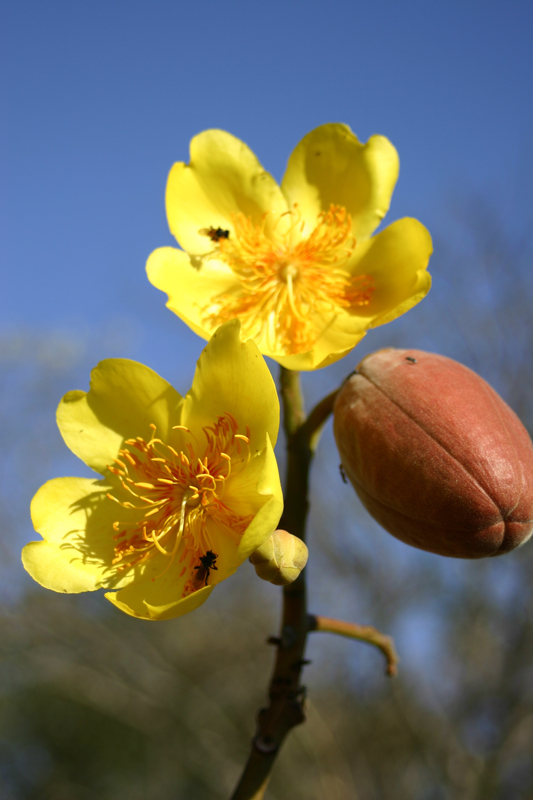
Detail of flower and fruit.

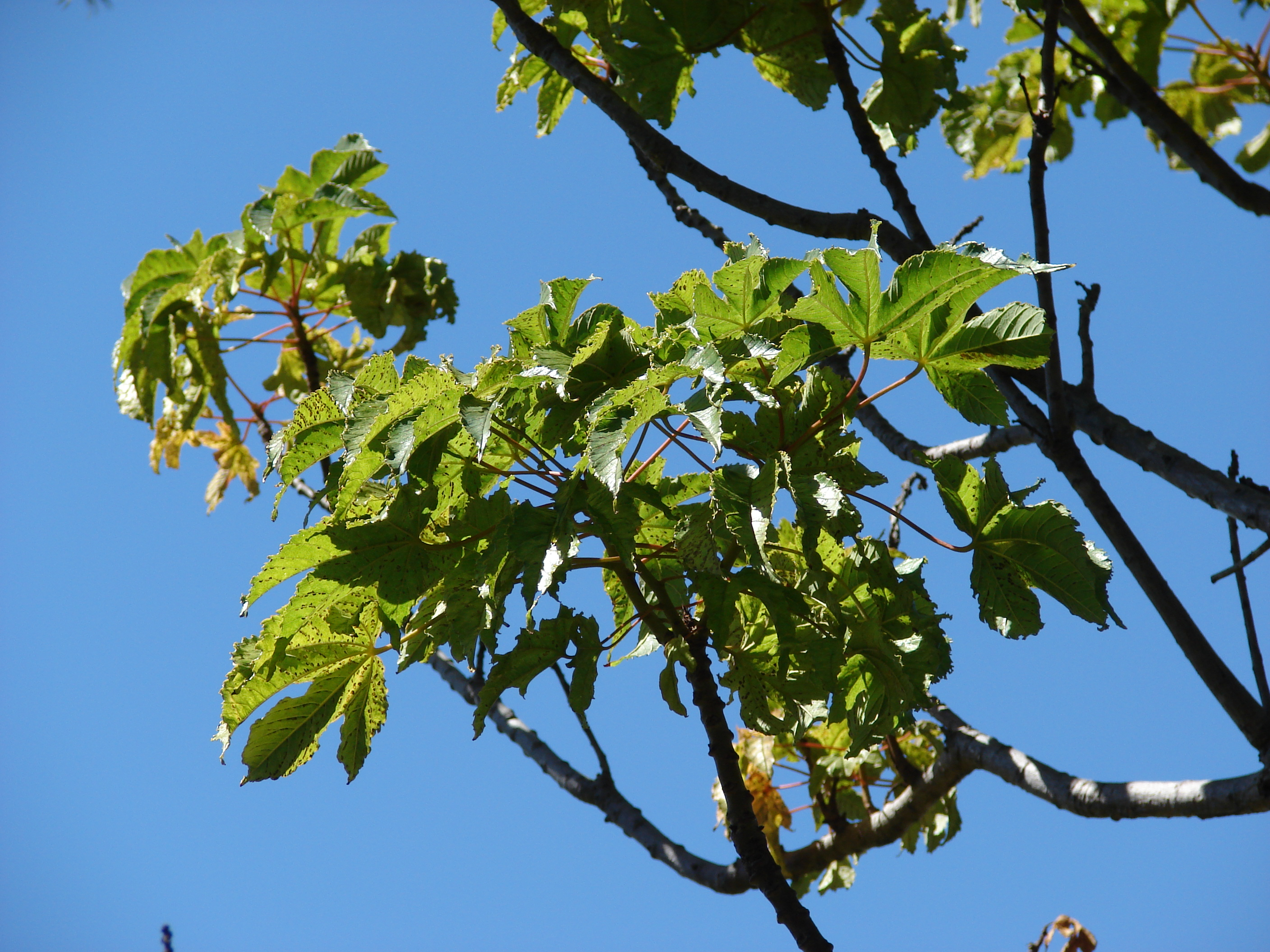
Detail of the leaves.

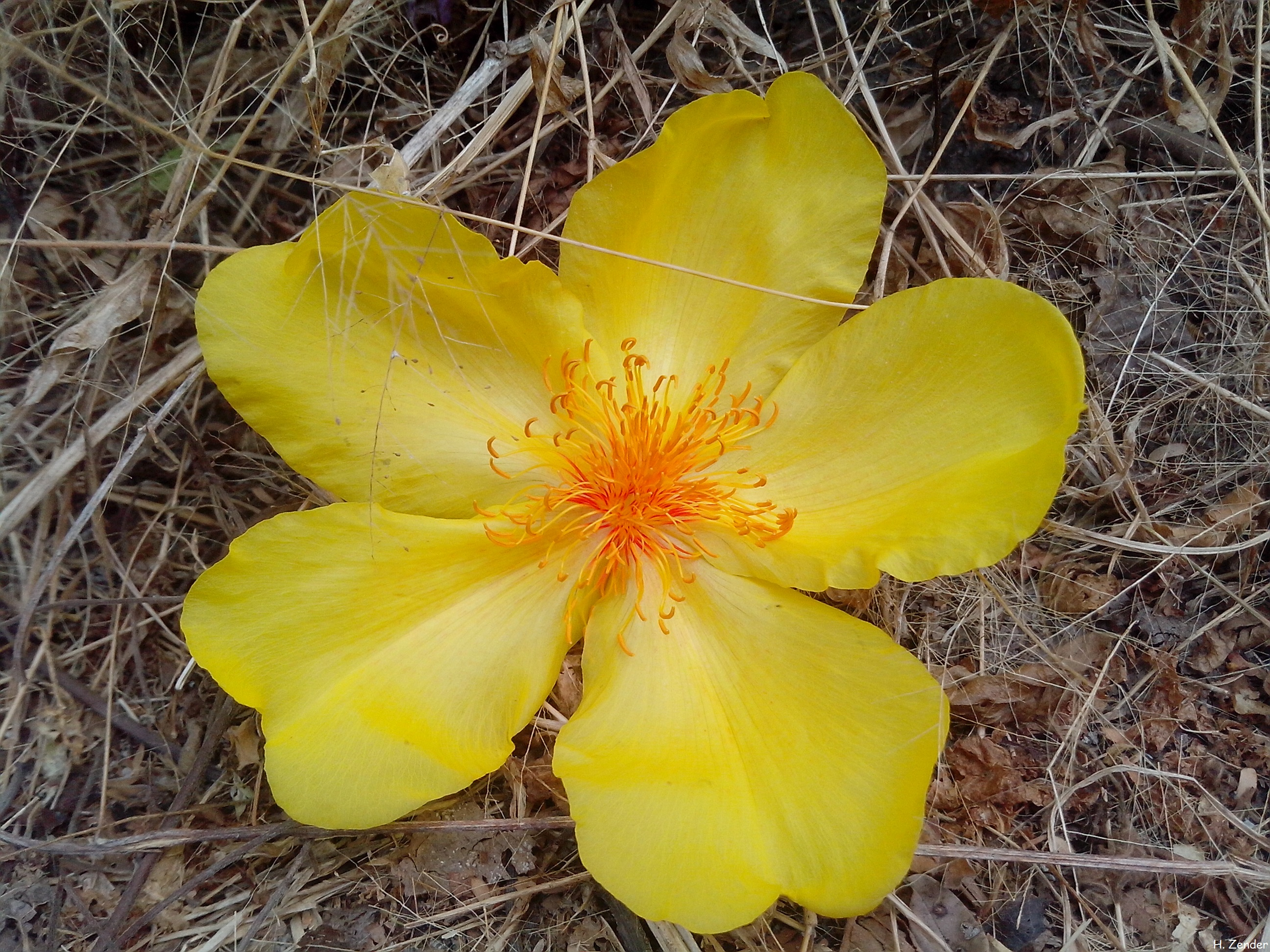
Detail of flower.

== Description ==
They are plants, trees, or shrubs, reaching a size of 3–15 metres (10–50 ft) tall. Leaves with 5–7 elliptic to oblong lobes, acuminate, nearly entire to serrate, glabrous or pubescent on the underside. Terminal panicle broad, flowers actinomorphic, 8–12 centimetres (3–5 in) wide; petals broadly obovate, emarginate, yellow; ovary 1-locular, with 5 parietal placentas. Capsule suberect to hanging, broadly ovate to obovate umbilicate, outer valve dark brown, gray or greenish, velvety or glabrous, inner valve ochre to cream, glabrous; seeds kidney-shaped with white gossypinous trichomes.

== Distribution and habitat ==
Native to tropical America, it presents a continuous distribution, found in the tropics from western Mexico, through Central America and the northern part of South America, to Ecuador, Peru, Bolivia, Brazil, the Guyanas, and Trinidad. In Mexico, it is distributed in warm, semi-warm, and temperate climates from sea level to 1,000 metres (3,300 ft), present in disturbed vegetation associated with dunes, mangrove edges, savannah, tropical forests deciduous, subdeciduous, subperennial, and perennial, xerophytic shrubland on plains or hills, spiny forest, on the edges of cloud forest, oak and pine forests.

== Properties ==
The yellow rose is commonly used against jaundice, also known as tiricia, yellow mal or infectious jaundice. As a remedy for this ailment, it is advised to soak the bark of this tree along with that of guázima (Guazuma ulmifolia) and with this water bathe the sick person, it can also be taken as drinking water. On some occasions, it is recommended to pour water into a small canoe made with the wood of this tree and let it rest overnight to then drink it. In Quintana Roo and Oaxaca, an infusion is prepared with the leaves and/or bark. For the same purpose, it is used in Sonora and in the State of Mexico, where jaundice is recognized as "yellow spots by biliary infection."

However, the flower is also used, in the form of a potion to reduce fever and relieve the flu. Boiled it is used for baths against scabies and for washing burns, in which case the crushed leaves are also applied to them. In decoction, it is used as a rinse after bathing for urticaria or malaria, although in this case it can be drunk.

In Veracruz, its use is only mentioned in the bite of a snake or snake bite by spreading the powder over the affected area. Other medicinal uses given to this plant are against diarrhea, liver diseases, and generally to stop postpartum and nasal hemorrhages, against pimples, and ulcers. Additionally, they are used as a pectoral and for curative baths.

History

The only reference found corresponds to Maximino Martínez in the 20th century, where its use for jaundice and as a pectoral is mentioned.

Chemistry

Little is known about the chemistry of C. vitifolium. In the whole plant, the flavonoids naringenin and quercetin have been found. In the leaf, coumarin, ellagic acid, and the phenolic component gentisic acid, and in the root, the carotenoid vitexin.

== Taxonomy ==
Cochlospermum vitifolium was described by (Willd.) Spreng. and published in Systema Vegetabilium, sixteenth edition 2: 596. 1825.

Synonymy

- Bombax vitifolium Willd.
- Cochlospermum codinae Eichler
- Cochlospermum hibiscoides Kunth
- Cochlospermum hibiscoides var. dasycarpum Triana & Planch.
- Cochlospermum hibiscoides var. gymnocarpum Triana & Planch.
- Cochlospermum luetzeiburgii Pilg.
- Cochlospermum luetzelburgii Pilg.
- Cochlospermum serratifolium DC.
- Cochlospermum triphyllum (S.F.Blake) Pittier
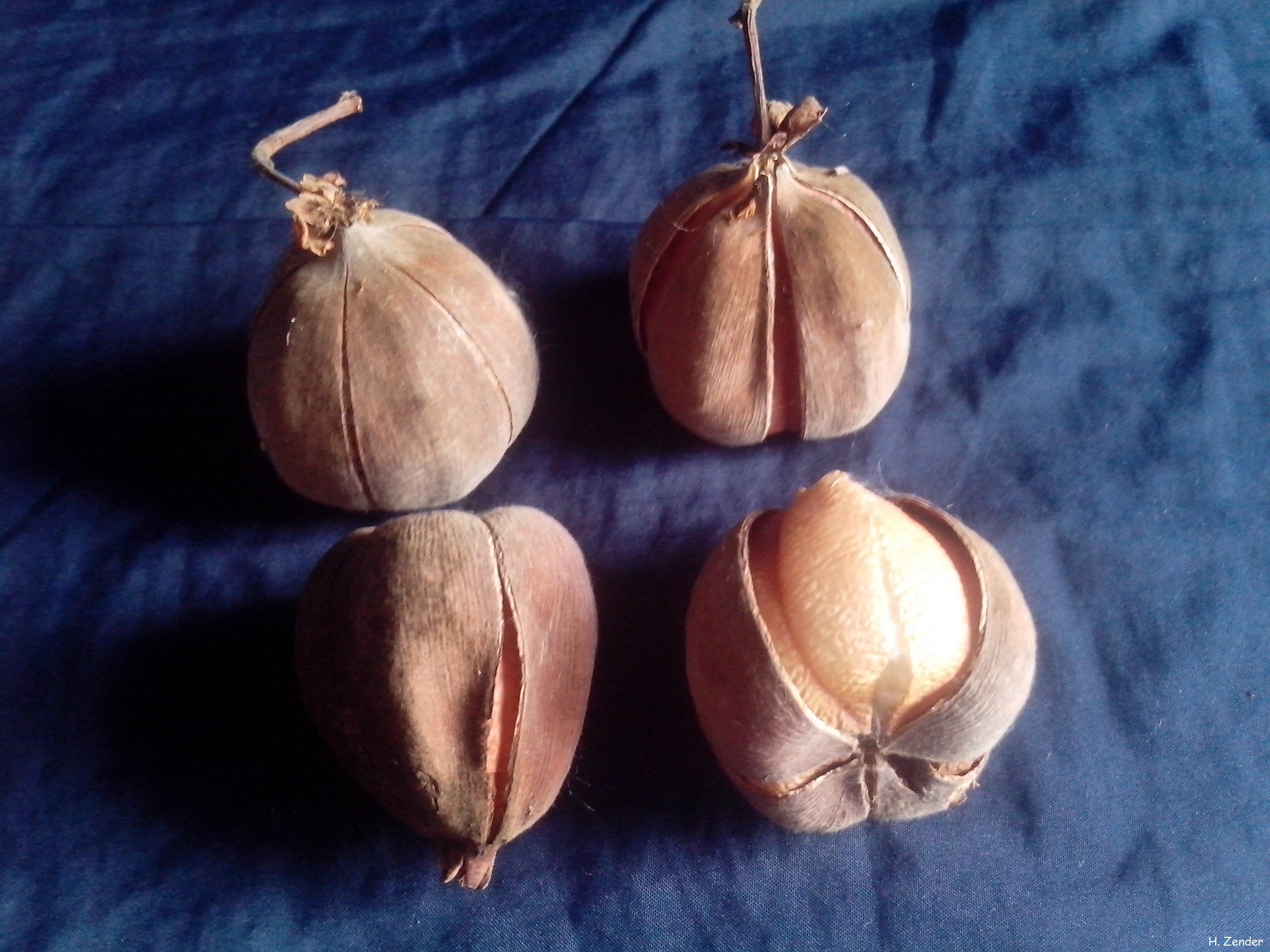
- Details of the Valves or seed-containing capsules.
  Lachnocistus utilis Duchass. ex Linden & Planch.
- Mahurea speciosa Choisy
- Maximilianea codinae (Eichler) Kuntze
- Maximilianea hibiscodes (Kunth) Kuntze
- Maximilianea hibiscoides (Kunth) Millsp.
- Maximilianea triphylla S.F.Blake
- Maximilianea vitifolia (Willd.) Krug & Urb.
- Wittelsbachia vitifolia (Willd.) Mart. & Zucc.

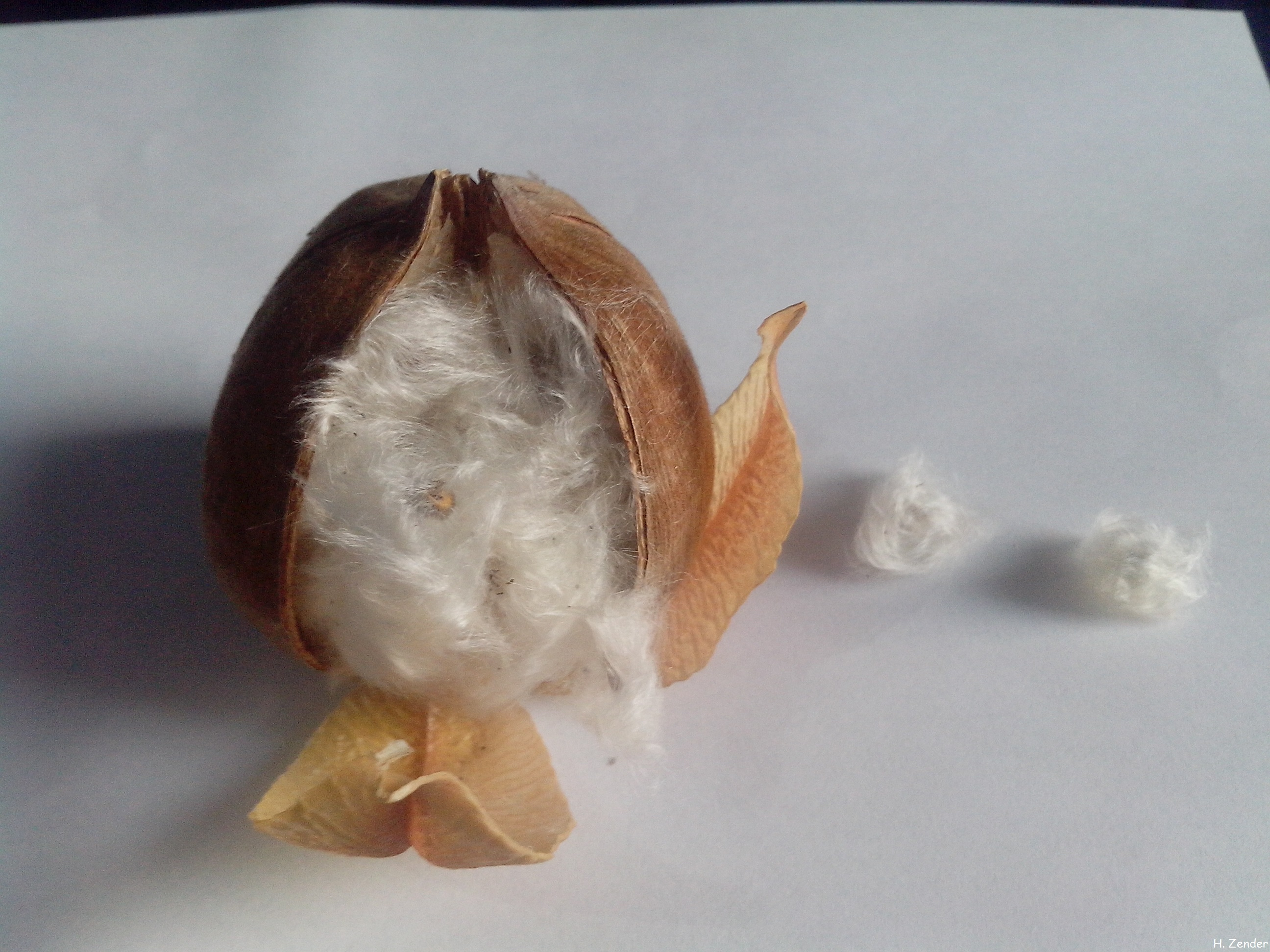
Details: Kidney-shaped seeds with white gossypinous trichomes.

== Common names ==
- Rosa amarilla ("yellow rose" in Spanish)
- Botija from Cuba
- Bototillo, botulo from Guayaquil
- Carnestolendo from Caracas.
