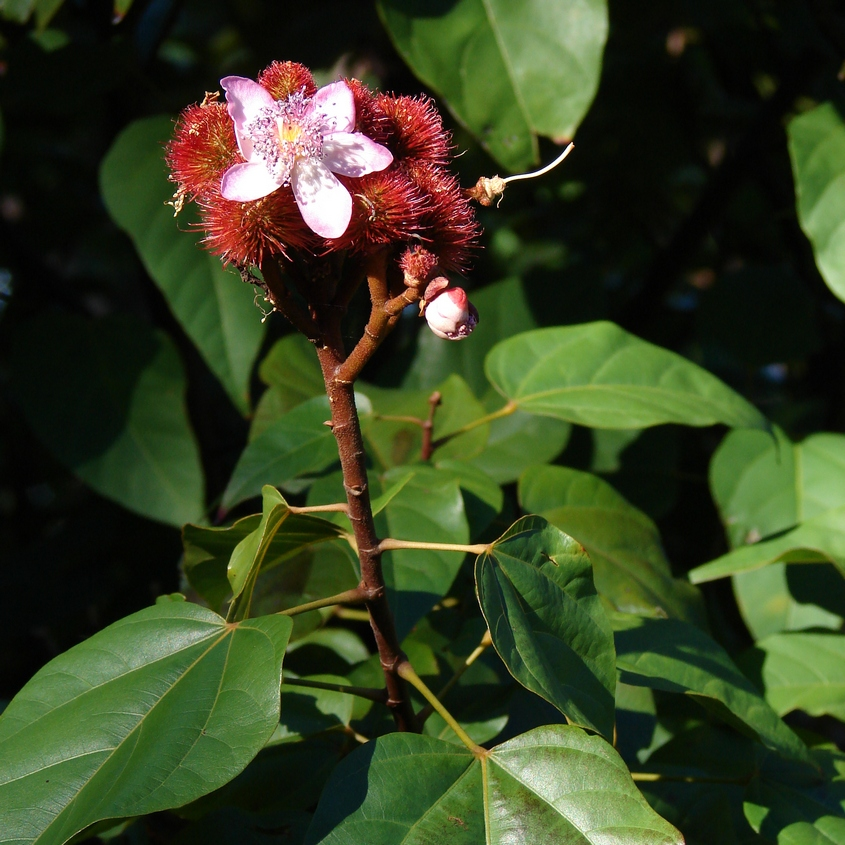
- Leaves, flower and fruits of Bixa orellana

Scientific classification
- Kingdom: Plantae
- Clade: Tracheophytes
- Clade: Angiosperms
- Clade: Eudicots
- Clade: Rosids
- Order: Malvales
- Family: Bixaceae
- Genus: Bixa; L.

Synonyms
- Orleania C.Commelijn ex Boehm.; Urucu Adans.; Orellana Kuntze

= Bixa =

Genus of flowering plants

Bixa is a genus of plants in the family Bixaceae. It is native to Mexico, Central America, Caribbean, and South America, and naturalized in other places.

== Species ==
The genus includes the following species:

- Bixa arborea Huber – Brazil, Ecuador, Peru
- Bixa atlantica Antar & Sano – E. Brazil
- Bixa excelsa Gleason & Krukoff – Peru, northwestern Brazil
- Bixa orellana L. – type species – widespread from Mexico to Argentina; naturalized in West Indies, parts of Africa, India, Sri Lanka, the Philippines, Christmas Island, Hawaii, Society Islands
- Bixa platycarpa Ruiz & Pav. ex G.Don – Ecuador, Peru, northwestern Brazil
- Bixa urucurana Willd. – Honduras, Panama, Colombia, Venezuela, the Guianas, Ecuador, Peru, northwestern Brazil
