= Cochlospermaceae =

Family of flowering plants

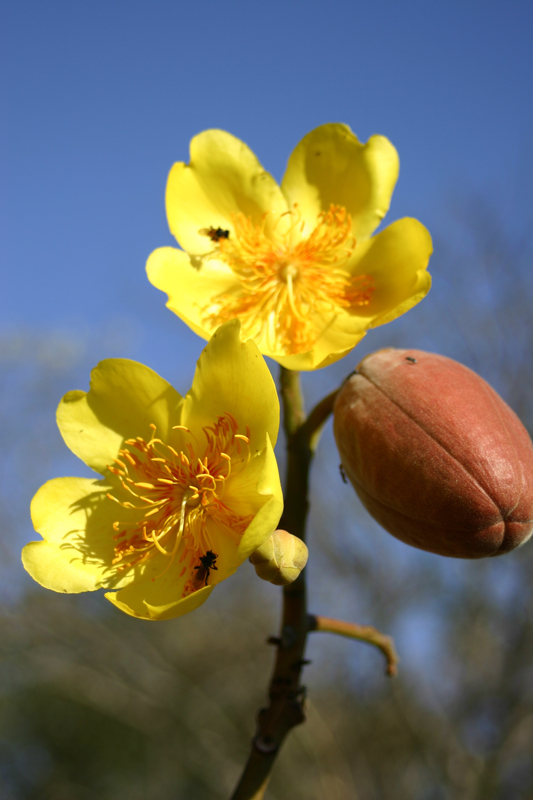
Cochlospermum vitifolium in Guanacaste, Costa Rica

The Cochlospermaceae were a family of two genera and 20-25 species of trees and shrubs, first described by Jules Émile Planchon in 1847. They have been included in the Bixaceae from the APG III system onwards. The older APG II system treated this family as an optional segregate of Bixaceae. They occur widely throughout the tropical regions of the world, but are absent from Malaysia. Most species in this family are mesophytic or xerophytic, growing primarily in drier climates.
