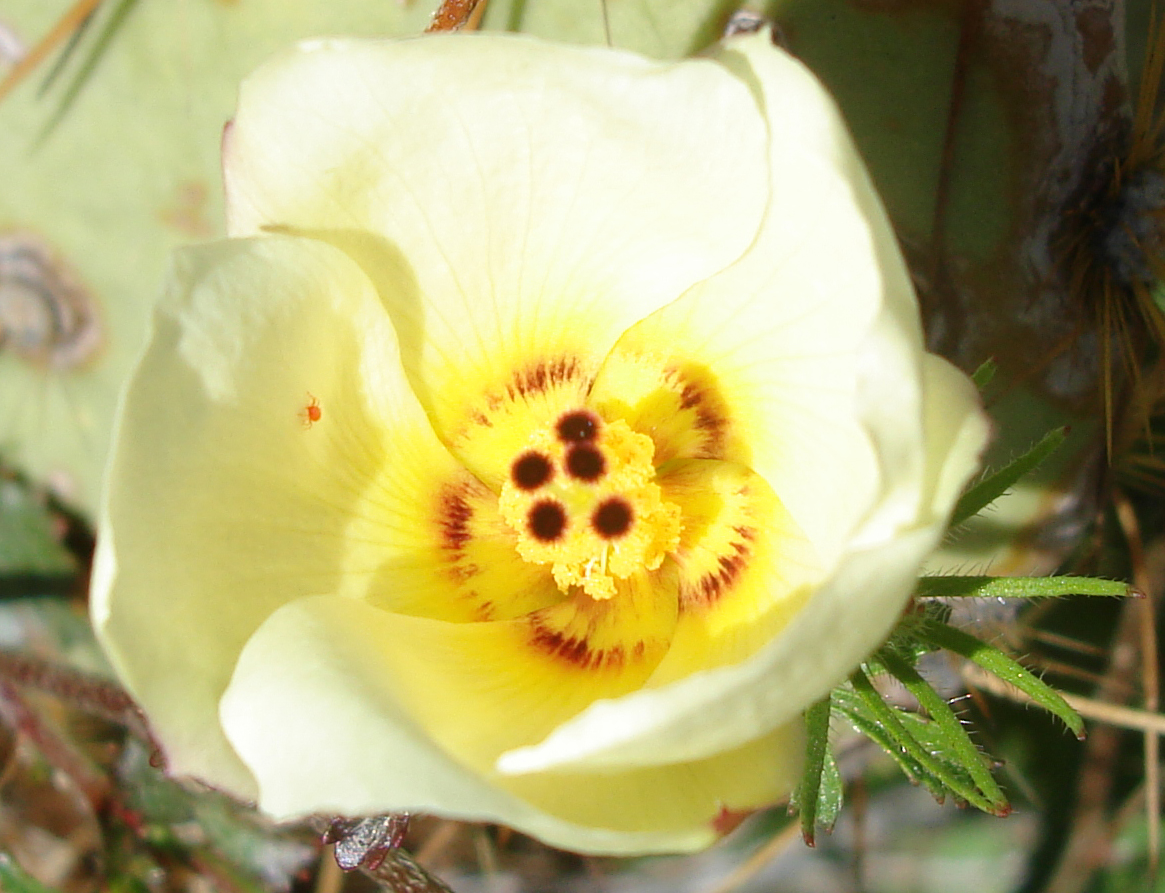
- Close-up of flower
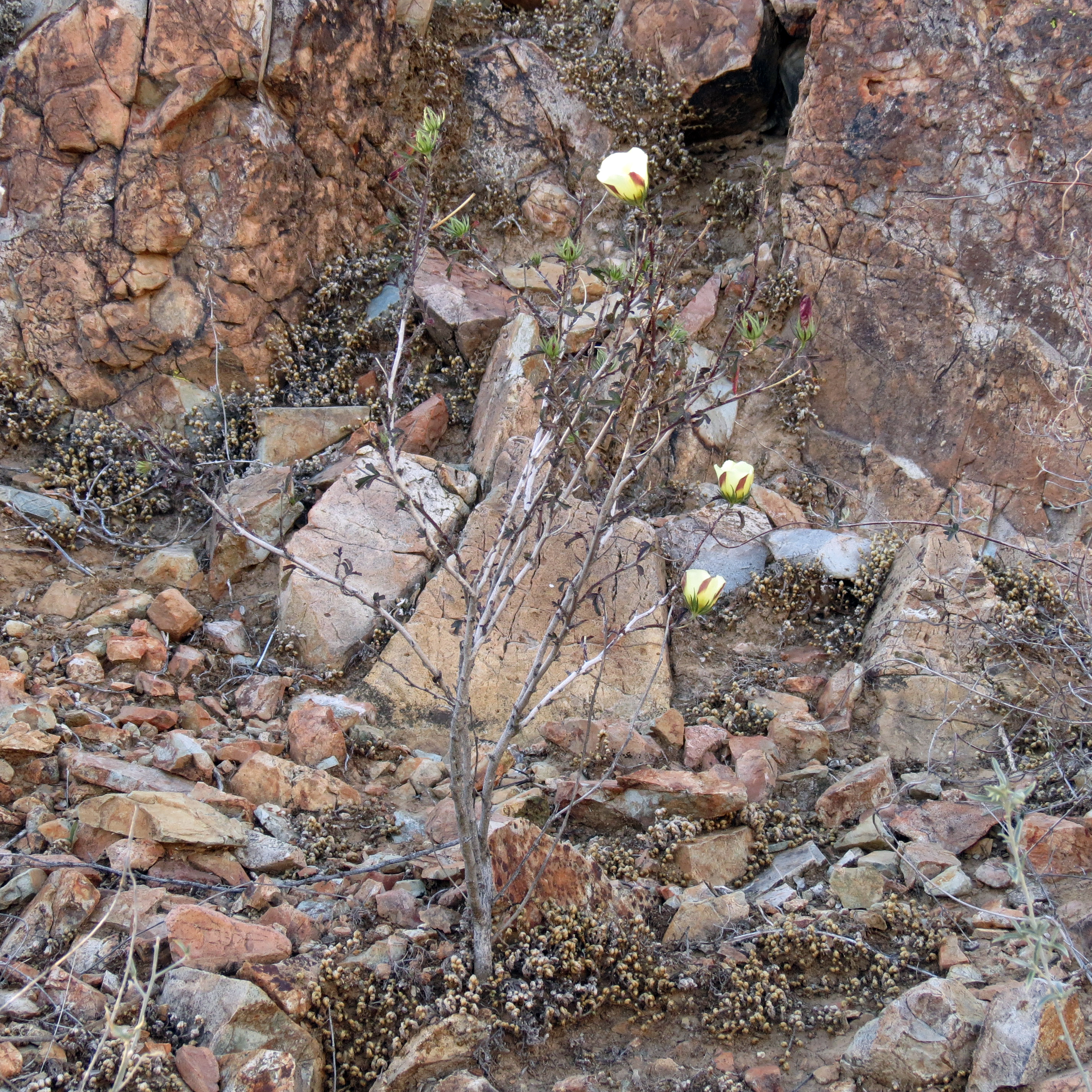
- Base becomes woody

Scientific classification
- Kingdom: Plantae
- Clade: Tracheophytes
- Clade: Angiosperms
- Clade: Eudicots
- Clade: Rosids
- Order: Malvales
- Family: Malvaceae
- Genus: Hibiscus
- Species: H. coulteri

Binomial name
- Hibiscus coulteri Harv. ex A.Gray

Synonyms
- Hibiscus coulteri var. brevipedunculatus M.E.Jones

= Hibiscus coulteri =

Species of plant

Hibiscus coulteri, the desert rosemallow, is a species of flowering plant in the family Malvaceae. It is native to steep slopes and canyon walls in the eastern Sonoran Desert, and the Chihuahuan Desert of the southwestern US and northern Mexico. It is a short-lived perennial shrub reaching 6 ft (1.8 m) and is used for xeriscaping.

Hibiscus coulteri is well-adapted to dry desert environments. It has hairy leaves that help conserve water, and its yellow flowers bloom mainly after rain. These species are very important when it comes to being pollinators during dry periods. Despite being short-lived, Hibiscus coulteri is recommended for landscapes with dry areas because it can grow with very little water.

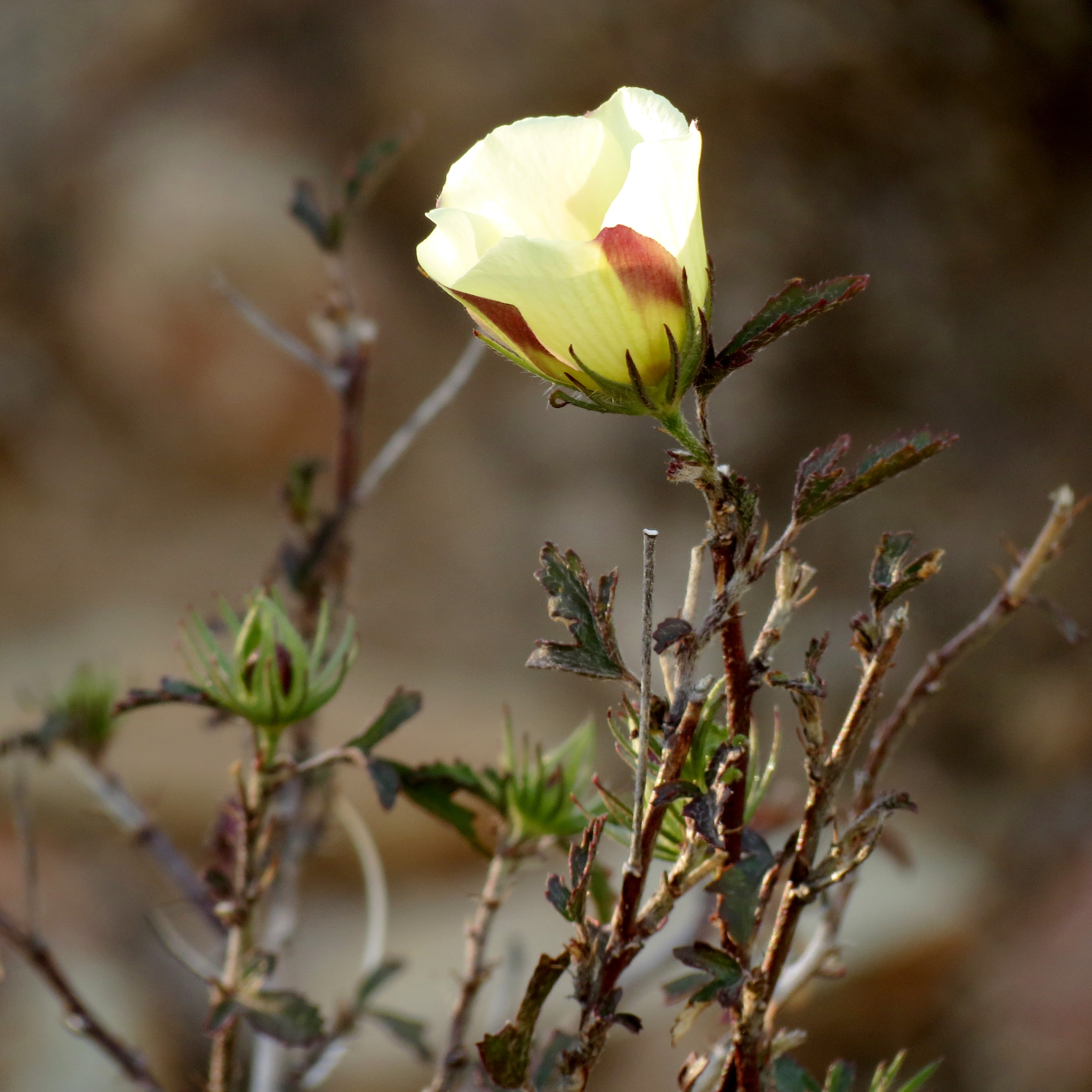
Stems, leaves, and flower
