= Amoreuxia palmatifida =

Scientific classification
- Kingdom: Plantae
- Clade: Tracheophytes
- Clade: Angiosperms
- Clade: Eudicots
- Clade: Rosids
- Order: Malvales
- Family: Bixaceae
- Genus: Amoreuxia
- Species: A. palmatifida

Binomial name
- Amoreuxia palmatifida Moc. & Sessé ex DC.

Species of flowering plant

Amoreuxia palmatifida (common names saiya or temaquí) is a perennial herb with a native range from Arizona and New Mexico, through Mexico, Central America and Colombia. It has yellow flowers and long, narrow capsules. The leaves, roots, flowers, and fruits provided food for natives of Arizona and northern Mexico.

Amoreuxia palmatifida was observed near Zacapa in the Motagua Valley of Guatemala as an expansive ground cover blanketing the very dry terrain in June. Its flower is described as bright-orange, with purple spots on four of the five petals and tiered banks of twelve stamens with purple and orange anthers. Amoreuxia palmatifida Moc. & Sessé ex DC., Prodr. 2: 638–639. 1825.
