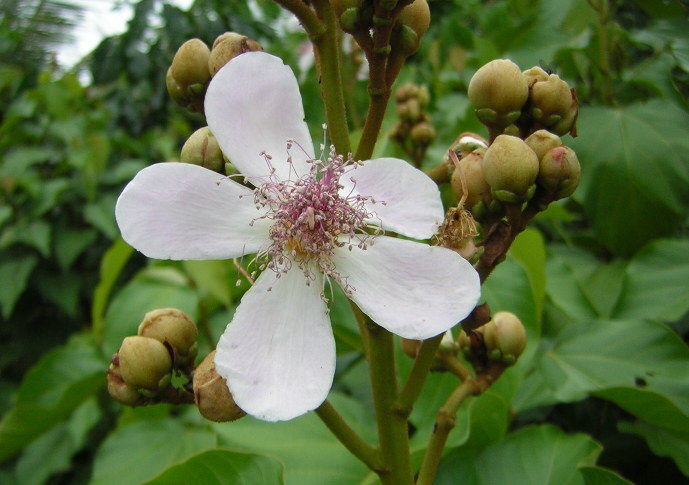
- Bixa orellana (Achiote)

Scientific classification
- Kingdom: Plantae
- Clade: Tracheophytes
- Clade: Angiosperms
- Clade: Eudicots
- Clade: Rosids
- Order: Malvales
- Family: Bixaceae; Kunth

= Bixaceae =

Family of flowering plants

The Bixaceae are a family of dicotyledonous plants commonly called the achiote family. Under the Cronquist system, the family was traditionally placed in the order Violales. However, newer arrangements move it, with some other families previously in the Violales, into the Malvales.

Although small, this family includes trees, herbs, and shrubs. The plants are bisexual, and all species have five sepals. All plants within the Bixaceae produce a red, orange, or yellow latex.

== Genera ==
The Bixaceae include three genera and a total of 25 species, although Cochlospermum is sometimes placed into its own family Cochlospermaceae. The best-known species is the source of annatto, the achiote, which belongs to the type genus of the family.

- Bixa
- Cochlospermum (Amoreuxia is now a synonym)
- Diegodendron
