= List of malvid families =

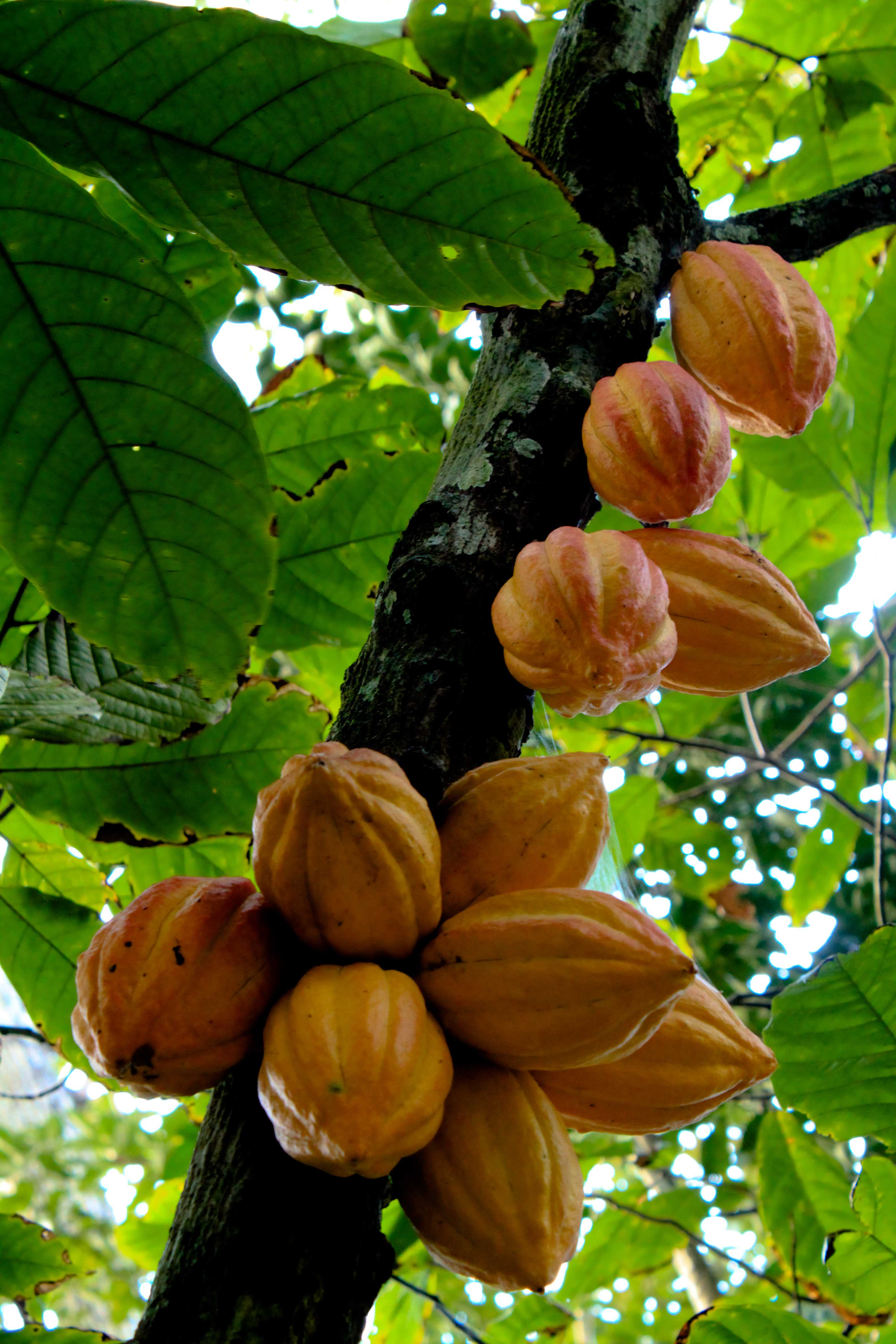
Theobroma cacao, the source of chocolate (family Malvaceae)

The malvids consist of eight orders of flowering plants: Brassicales, Crossosomatales, Geraniales, Huerteales, Malvales, Myrtales, Picramniales and Sapindales. (Note: The taxonomy (classification) in this list follows Plants of the World (2017) and the fourth Angiosperm Phylogeny Group system. Total counts of genera for each family come from Plants of the World Online (POWO). (See the POWO license.) Extinct taxa are not included.) This subgroup of the rosids is divided into 59 families of trees, shrubs, vines and herbaceous plants.

The mustard family includes broccoli, turnips, mustards, and radishes. The ornamental geraniums, and their many hybrids and cultivars, come from five species of Pelargonium. The mallow family includes the plants that yield cocoa beans, Cola nuts, okra, cotton and jute. In the family Lythraceae, Pomegranates were cultivated by Bronze Age cultures, and wild water chestnuts were consumed in large quantities by prehistoric Europeans. Eucalyptus trees are the tallest known flowering plants, up to 100 m (330 ft) or more; they are grown for timber and for their oils, used in candy, perfumes and cough medicine. Mangos and cashews come from the same plant family as poison ivy, and can sometimes trigger allergic reactions. Canada produces most of the world's maple syrup, and the maple leaf is the country's national symbol. Citrus agriculture outranks other sweet-fruit industries in warm climates.

== Glossary ==
From the glossary of botanical terms:

- annual: a plant species that completes its life cycle within a single year or growing season
- basal: attached close to the base (of a plant or an evolutionary tree diagram)
- climber: a vine that leans on, twines around or clings to other plants for vertical support
- deciduous: falling seasonally, as with bark, leaves, or petals
- glandular hair: a hair tipped with a secretory structure
- herbaceous: not woody; usually green and soft in texture
- mangrove: any shrub or small tree growing in brackish or salt water
- perennial: not an annual or biennial
- succulent (adjective): juicy or fleshy
- unisexual: of one sex; bearing only male or only female reproductive organs
- woody: hard and lignified; not herbaceous

The APG IV system is the fourth in a series of plant taxonomies from the Angiosperm Phylogeny Group. In this system, Geraniales and Myrtales are basal within the malvids.

== Families ==
Families
Family and a common name (Note: Each family's formal name ends in the Latin suffix -aceae and is derived from the name of a genus that is or once was part of the family.)	Type genus and etymology (Note: Some plants were named for naturalists (unless otherwise noted).)	Total genera; global distribution	Description and uses	Order	Type genus images
Akaniaceae (turnipwood family)	Akania, from Greek for "bractless", possibly	2 genera, in the Himalayas, China, Southeast Asia and Australia	Trees with a mustard scent in the bark and flowers	Brassicales	Akania bidwillii
Alzateaceae (wantsum family)	Alzatea, for José Antonio de Alzate y Ramírez (d. 1795), a cartographer	1 genus, in South America	Short evergreen trees and shrubs with four-sided stems	Myrtales	Alzatea verticillata
Anacardiaceae (cashew family)	Anacardium, from a Greek plant name	79 genera, mostly in the tropics, with some temperate species	Shrubs, trees and vines, generally with sap that can turn black. Cashews and mangos are commercially important tropical crops.	Sapindales	Anacardium occidentale
Aphloiaceae (mountain-peach family)	Aphloia, from Greek for "unbarked"	1 genus, in Africa and on islands of the Indian Ocean	Evergreen shrubs and small trees	Crossosomatales	Aphloia theiformis
Bataceae (turtleweed family)	Batis, from Greek for "walking"	1 genus, in New Guinea, Australia, and the tropics and subtropics of the Americas	Short, succulent viny shrubs with unisexual flowers	Brassicales	Batis maritima
Biebersteiniaceae (khardug family)	Biebersteinia, for Friedrich August Marschall von Bieberstein (1768–1826)	1 genus, in Eurasia	Foul-smelling herbaceous perennials with woody rhizomes	Sapindales	—
Bixaceae (annatto family)	Bixa, from a Carib plant name	3 genera, in the Americas and Madagascar	Shrubs, trees and herbaceous perennials. Bixa orellana yields annatto, a widely used red food dye.	Malvales	Bixa orellana
Brassicaceae (cabbage family)	Brassica, from a Latin plant name	344 genera, scattered around the world, especially in the Northern Hemisphere	Shrubs and herbaceous plants, with a few vines and small trees and a few species that grow in water. The cabbage family includes broccoli, cauliflower, turnips, watercress, radishes and horseradish, along with the plants that yield canola oil and the mustards.	Brassicales	Brassica oleracea
Burseraceae (frankincense-and-myrrh family)	Bursera, for Joachim Burser (1583–1639)	18 genera, in the tropics	Generally unisexual shrubs and trees, with some climbers and some species that grow on other plants. Most species, especially in the frankincense and myrrh genera, are heavily scented.	Sapindales	Bursera simaruba
Capparaceae (caper family)	Capparis, from a Greek plant name	15 genera, around the world	Shrubs and trees, with up to 250 stamens per flower. Capers (the preserved flower buds of Capparis) are usually harvested in the wild rather than cultivated.	Brassicales	Capparis spinosa
Caricaceae (papaya family)	Carica, from a Latin plant name	6 genera, in West Africa and the tropics of the Americas	Shrubs and trees, usually unisexual and spiny, with a few vines. Papaya fruit was already in cultivation in Central America before 1500.	Brassicales	Carica papaya
Cistaceae (rock-rose family)	Cistus, from a Greek plant name	8 genera, mainly in warmer parts of the Northern Hemisphere	Shrubs and herbaceous plants, frequently with volatile oils, with a few tall tree species. Labdanum (from Cistus) is used in perfumes.	Malvales	Cistus monpeliensis
Cleomaceae (spiderflower family)	Cleome, from Greek for "glory"	2 genera, in the subtropics, the tropics, and North America	Shrubs and herbaceous plants. The leaves are consumed in South Africa.	Brassicales	Cleome ornithopodioides
Combretaceae (bushwillow family)	Combretum, from a Latin plant name	10 genera, in the tropics	Shrubs, trees and woody vines, along with a few mangroves	Myrtales	Combretum fruticosum
Crossosomataceae (rockflower family)	Crossosoma, from Greek for "fringed body" (of the seeds)	4 genera, in the US and northeastern Mexico	Shrubs, often with small leaves, and a few trees	Crossosomatales	Crossosoma californicum
Crypteroniaceae (bekoi family)	Crypteronia, from Greek for "hidden love" (for the small flowers)	3 genera, in the Asian tropics	Evergreen trees with tiny bisexual or unisexual flowers	Myrtales	—
Cytinaceae (rockrose-rape family)	Cytinus, from Greek for "part of a pomegranate"	2 genera, in Africa and nearby islands, western Asia, and Mexico to northern South America	Parasitic plants without chlorophyll, usually with unisexual flowers	Malvales	Cytinus hypocistis
Dipentodontaceae (shichi family)	Dipentodon, from Greek for "two groups of five teeth" (on the sepals and petals)	2 genera, scattered around the world	Unisexual and bisexual shrubs and trees	Huerteales	—
Dipterocarpaceae (maranti family)	Dipterocarpus, from Greek for "two-winged fruit"	16 genera, in South America, Africa and southern parts of Asia	Mostly evergreen trees with scented resins. These rainforest trees were an important source of timber and camphor a century ago, but they have been depleted from overlogging.	Malvales	Dipterocarpus alatus
Emblingiaceae (slippercreeper family)	Emblingia, for Thomas Embling (1814–1893)	1 genus, in Australia	Herbaceous shrubs with low branches	Brassicales	Emblingia calceoliflora
Francoaceae (bridal-wreath family)	Francoa, for Francisco Franco (c. 1515 – c. 1569), a Spanish doctor	6 genera, in South America and Africa	Small trees, large shrubs and herbaceous plants, some used in herbal teas	Geraniales	Francoa appendiculata
Geissolomataceae (cape-cups family)	Geissoloma, from Greek for "tiled fringe" (on the petals)	1 genus, in South Africa	Short, many-branched shrubs that bioaccumulate aluminium	Crossosomatales	Geissoloma marginatum
Geraniaceae (crane's-bill family)	Geranium, from a Greek plant name meaning "crane"	8 genera, scattered around the world	Shrubs and herbaceous plants, most of them hairy, some succulent	Geraniales	Geranium dissectum
Gerrardinaceae (brown-ironwood family)	Gerrardina, for William Tyrer Gerrard (c. 1831 – 1866)	1 genus, in southern Africa and Tanzania	Shrubs and small trees, frequently with drooping branches	Huerteales	Gerrardina foliosa
Guamatelaceae (Guatemalan-bramble family)	Guamatela, an anagram of Guatemala	1 genus, in Mexico and Central America	Many-branched shrubs	Crossosomatales	—
Gyrostemonaceae (buttoncreeper family)	Gyrostemon, from Greek for "round stamens"	5 genera, in Australia	Annual unisexual shrubs and small trees, frequently succulent	Brassicales	Gyrostemon ramulosis
Kirkiaceae (white-seringa family)	Kirkia, for John Kirk (1832–1922)	1 genus, in Africa	Trees and shrubs with essentially unisexual flowers. Timber from Kirkia acuminata is used for construction, furniture and tool-making.	Sapindales	Kirkia wilmsii
Koeberliniaceae (allthorn family)	Koeberlinia, for Christoph Ludwig Köberlin (1794–1862), a German botanist and clergyman	1 genus, in the US, Mexico and Bolivia	Deciduous, many-branched, thorny-tipped shrubs and small trees	Brassicales	Koeberlinia spinosa
Limnanthaceae (meadowfoam family)	Limnanthes, from Greek for "marsh flowers"	2 genera, in North America	Mustard-scented herbaceous annuals. Poached egg plant is grown as an ornamental.	Brassicales	Limnanthes douglasii
Lythraceae (pomegranate family)	Lythrum, from Greek for "bloody" (flowers)	28 genera, in temperate and tropical Eurasia, Africa and Oceania	Shrubs, trees and herbaceous plants, often with square stems, with some mangroves and aquatic species	Myrtales	Lythrum salicaria
Malvaceae (mallow family)	Malva, from a Latin plant name	245 genera, scattered worldwide	Hairy shrubs, trees and herbaceous plants. Cocoa beans are native to tropical South and Central America, and Cola nuts are native to West Africa. The most commercially valuable genera are Gossypium (for cotton) and Corchorus (for jute).	Malvales	Malva sylvestris
Melastomataceae (senduduk family)	Melastoma, from Greek for "black mouth" (the result of eating the berries)	164 genera, mostly in the tropics and subtropics	Trees, shrubs and herbaceous plants, with a few species that grow in water or on other plants	Myrtales	Melastoma malabathricum
Meliaceae (neem family)	Melia, from a Greek plant name	58 genera, in the tropics, with some temperate species	Generally unisexual shrublets, shrubs and trees. Neem oil has many uses, including as a pesticide, and the wood is similar to mahogany.	Sapindales	Melia azedarach
Moringaceae (horseradish-tree family)	Moringa, from a Tamil plant name	1 genus, in Africa, Southwest Asia and South Asia	Mustard-scented shrubs and trees, with a few herbaceous plants	Brassicales	Moringa oleifera
Muntingiaceae (bajelly-tree family)	Muntingia, for Abraham Munting (1626–1683)	3 genera, from Mexico to South America	Hairy shrubs and trees	Malvales	Muntingia calabura
Myrtaceae (myrtle family)	Myrtus, from Greek and Latin plant names	126 genera, in the tropics and warmer temperate zones	Evergreen shrubs and trees, most with volatile oils, including Eucalyptus and the tree that produces clove spice	Myrtales	Myrtus communis
Neuradaceae (pietsnot family)	Neurada, from Greek and Latin plant names	3 genera, in Africa and southern Asia	Herbaceous plants, usually with hairy stems that hug the ground	Malvales	Neurada procumbens
Nitrariaceae (nitrebush family)	Nitraria, from Greek for "nitre" (found near the plant)	4 genera, scattered around the world	Shrubs and herbaceous plants, frequently succulent, that bioaccumulate salt	Sapindales	Nitraria billardierei
Onagraceae (fuchsia family)	Oenothera. Onagra, an earlier synonym, is from Greek for (fodder for the) "onager".	22 genera, scattered worldwide	Shrubs and a few trees and woody vines, including Fuchsia and evening primrose	Myrtales	Oenothera biennis
Penaeaceae (cape-fellwort family)	Penaea, for Pierre Pena (1535–1605), a French doctor and botanist	3 genera, from South Africa to Ethiopia	Small shrubs to tall trees with buttress roots, all with four-sided new stems	Myrtales	Penaea mucronata
Pentadiplandraceae (oubli family)	Pentadiplandra, from Greek for "five double male" (stamens)	1 genus, in the African tropics	Just one species: a shrub with smooth stems that occasionally sprouts woody vines	Brassicales	Pentadiplandra brazzeana
Petenaeaceae (Petén-linden family)	Petenaea, for Lake Petén Itzá	1 genus, in Mexico and Central America	Large shrubs and small trees	Huerteales	—
Picramniaceae (bitterbush family)	Picramnia, from Greek for "bitter bush"	4 genera, in South America and southern North America	Unisexual shrubs and trees with small flowers	Picramniales	Picramnia glazioviana
Resedaceae (mignonette family)	Reseda, from a Latin plant name	11 genera, around the world	Shrubs, trees, vines and herbaceous plants. Reseda odorata (a mignonette species) is an ornamental that is also used in perfumes.	Brassicales	Reseda lutea
Rutaceae (citrus family)	Ruta, from a Latin plant name	153 genera, in tropical and temperate zones	Shrubs, trees and herbaceous perennials, usually scented. Citrus fruits were in cultivation in China 5000 years ago.	Sapindales	Ruta graveolens
Salvadoraceae (toothbrush-tree family)	Salvadora, for Jaime Salvador y Pedrol (1649–1740), a Spanish apothecary	3 genera, in Africa and South Asia	Shrubs and small trees with succulent or leathery leaves	Brassicales	Salvadora persica
Sapindaceae (maple family)	Sapindus, from Latin for "soap of India"	143 genera, in the tropics, with some temperate species	Shrubs, trees, climbers and herbaceous perennials. Lychee and rambutan fruits are widely cultivated in Asia. The family contains many ornamental species.	Sapindales	Sapindus saponaria
Sarcolaenaceae (tunic-bells family)	Sarcolaena, from Greek for "flesh cloak"	10 genera, in Madagascar	Hairy evergreen shrubs and trees	Malvales	Sarcolaena oblongifolia
Setchellanthaceae (azulita family)	Setchellanthus, for William Albert Setchell (1864–1943)	1 genus, in Mexico	Hairy many-branched shrubs with succulent leaves	Brassicales	—
Simaroubaceae (tree-of-heaven family)	Simarouba, from a Carib plant name	20 genera, in the tropics, with some temperate species	Shrubs and trees with bitter bark. Corkwood is lightweight, and used to make floats for fishing nets.	Sapindales	Simarouba amara
Sphaerosepalaceae (lombiry family)	Rhopalocarpus. Sphaerosepalum, an earlier synonym, is from Greek for "spherical sepals".	2 genera, in Madagascar	Shrubs and trees. Many of the species are threatened.	Malvales	—
Stachyuraceae (spiketail family)	Stachyurus, from Greek for "spike tail" (on the inflorescences)	1 genus, in East Asia and mainland Southeast Asia	Unisexual and bisexual shrubs and small trees, with a few vines	Crossosomatales	Stachyurus praecox
Staphyleaceae (bladdernut family)	Staphylea, from Greek for "clusters" (of flowers)	3 genera, scattered worldwide	Shrubs and trees	Crossosomatales	Staphylea pinnata
Strasburgeriaceae (tawari family)	Strasburgeria, for Eduard Strasburger (1844–1912)	2 genera, in New Caledonia and New Zealand	Evergreen trees	Crossosomatales	Strasburgeria robusta
Tapisciaceae (silverpheasant-tree family)	Tapiscia, an anagram of the genus Pistacia	2 genera, in the Americas and in East and mainland Southeast Asia	Trees with fluorescent wood	Huerteales	Tapiscia sinensis
Thymelaeaceae (mezereon family)	Thymelaea, from Greek for "poison olive"	52 genera, scattered worldwide	Generally poisonous shrubs, small trees and herbaceous perennials, with a few vines. The bark of some species has traditionally been used to make strong, fibrous paper.	Malvales	Thymelaea hirsuta
Tovariaceae (stinkbush family)	Tovaria, for Simón de Tovar, a Spanish doctor and botanist	1 genus, from Mexico to the tropics of the Americas	Foul-smelling erect herbaceous perennials and floppy shrubs	Brassicales	Tovaria pendula
Tropaeolaceae (nasturtium family)	Tropaeolum, from Greek for "trophy"	1 genus, in Mexico and Central and South America	Mustard-scented herbaceous annuals and perennials, including garden nasturtium and other ornamentals	Brassicales	Tropaeolum majus
Vochysiaceae (quaruba family)	Vochysia, from a Carib plant name	8 genera, mainly in the tropics of the Americas and West Africa	Trees and shrubs that bioaccumulate aluminium	Myrtales	Vochysia lucida

== See also ==
- List of plant family names with etymologies
