= Unplaced in APG II =

Exception in plant classification

When the APG II system of plant classification was published in April 2003, fifteen genera and three families were placed incertae sedis in the angiosperms, and were listed in a section of the appendix entitled "Taxa of uncertain position".

- Aneulophus
- Apodanthaceae
- Balanophoraceae
- Bdallophyton
- Centroplacus
- Cynomorium
- Cytinus
- Dipentodon
- Gumillea
- Hoplestigma
- Leptaulus
- Medusandra
- Metteniusa
- Mitrastemon
- Pottingeria
- Rafflesiaceae
- Soyauxia
- Trichostephanus

By the end of 2009, molecular phylogenetic analysis of DNA sequences had revealed the relationships of most of these taxa, and all but three of them had been placed in some group within the angiosperms. In October 2009, APG II was superseded by the APG III system. In APG III, 11 of the genera listed above were placed in families, or else became families whose position within their orders was approximately or exactly known. The family Rafflesiaceae was placed in the order Malpighiales, close to Euphorbiaceae and possibly within it. Mitrastema became a monotypic family, Mitrastemonaceae. This family and Balanophoraceae were placed incertae sedis into orders, that is, their positions within these orders remained completely unknown. Metteniusa was found to belong to a supraordinal group known as the lamiids, which has not been satisfactorily divided into orders. Cynomorium was raised to familial status as Cynomoriaceae, and along with Apodanthaceae and Gumillea, remained unplaced in APG III. Five taxa were unplaced among the angiosperms in APG III because Nicobariodendron and Petenaea were added to the list.

== Leptaulus ==
There is no apparent reason for the inclusion of Leptaulus in the list of unplaced taxa, other than the time lag between submission and publication. In 2001, in a phylogenetic study based on morphological and DNA data, Leptaulus was found to belong to a group of six genera that most authors now consider to be the family Cardiopteridaceae. This was confirmed in a study of wood anatomy in 2008. The genus is placed in the Cardiopteridaceae in the APG III system of 2009. Before 2001, Leptaulus and the rest of Cardiopteridaceae had usually been placed in a broadly circumscribed Icacinaceae, which turned out to be polyphyletic.

Some botanists do not recognize Cardiopteridaceae as a family of six genera. Instead, they segregate Cardiopteris into a monogeneric Cardiopteridaceae sensu stricto and place the other five genera in the family Leptaulaceae. The monophyly of Leptaulaceae has never been tested with molecular data.

== Pottingeria ==
It had long been thought, at least by some, that the small Southeast Asian tree Pottingeria might belong in the order Celastrales. In a phylogenetic study of that order in 2006, Pottingeria was found to be a member of the order, but not of any of its families. It was in an unresolved pentatomy consisting of Parnassiaceae, Pottingeria, Mortonia, the pair (Quetzalia + Zinowiewia), and the other genera of Celastraceae. When the APG III system was published in October 2009, the Angiosperm Phylogeny Group expanded Celastraceae to include all members of the pentatomy mentioned above.

== Dipentodon ==
Dipentodon has one species Dipentodon sinicus. It is native to southern China, Burma, and northern India. In 2009, in a molecular phylogenetic study of the order Huerteales, it was shown that Dipentodon and Perrottetia belong together as the two genera of the family Dipentodontaceae.

== Medusandra and Soyauxia ==
In 2009, in a molecular phylogenetic study of Malpighiales, Kenneth Wurdack and Charles Davis sampled five genera and one family that had been unplaced in APG II. They placed some of these for the first time and confirmed the previous placement of others with strong statistical support.

In their outgroup, they included four genera from Saxifragales. These were Daphniphyllum, Medusandra, Soyauxia, and Peridiscus. In their phylogeny, Medusandra and Soyauxia formed a strongly supported clade with Peridiscus, a member of the family Peridiscaceae, the most basal clade in Saxifragales. Wurdack and Davis recommended that Medusandra and Soyauxia both be transferred to Peridiscaceae. Thus the monogeneric family Medusandraceae is subsumed into Peridiscaceae. Soyauxia had been found to be close to Peridiscus in another study two years before. Wurdack and Davis also found that the family Rafflesiaceae and the genera Aneulophus, Centroplacus, and Trichostephanus belong in the order Malpighiales.

== Aneulophus ==
Aneulophus consists of two species of woody plants from tropical West Africa. Wurdack and Davis found the traditional placement of Aneulophus in Erythroxylaceae to be correct. Its position within the family remains uncertain.

Erythroxylaceae is a family of four genera. Erythroxylum has about 230 species. Nectaropetalum has eight species and Pinacopodium has two. No one has yet produced a molecular phylogeny of the family.

== Centroplacus ==
Centroplacus has a single species, Centroplacus glaucinus, a tree from West Africa. It was found to be close to Bhesa, a genus that had only recently been removed from Celastrales. Bhesa was grouped with Centroplacus to become the second genus in Centroplacaceae. Bhesa consists of five species of trees from India and Malesia.

== Trichostephanus ==
Trichostephanus has two species, both in tropical West Africa. It had usually been assigned to Achariaceae, but it was found to be deeply embedded in Samydaceae. Many taxonomists do not recognize Samydaceae as a separate family from Salicaceae.

== Rafflesiaceae ==
Several genera have been removed from Rafflesiaceae, so that it now consists of only three genera: Sapria, Rhizanthes, and Rafflesia. All of these are holoparasites and, as discussed below, finding their relationships by molecular phylogenetics has presented special challenges. Rafflesia and its relatives were the subject of several papers from 2004 to 2009, and as the world's largest flower, Rafflesia has attracted special interest. In 2009, Wurdack and Davis confirmed earlier work in which it was found that Rafflesiaceae is nested within Euphorbiaceae sensu stricto, a circumscription of Euphorbiaceae that excludes Phyllanthaceae, Picrodendraceae, Putranjivaceae, Pandaceae, and a few other very small groups that had been included in it until the 1990s. In order to preserve Rafflesiaceae, Wurdack and Davis split Euphorbiaceae sensu stricto into Euphorbiaceae sensu strictissimo and Peraceae, a new family comprising Pera and four other genera.

== Parasites ==
Four of the unplaced genera, and all three of the unplaced families of APG II consist of achlorophyllous holoparasites. In these, the chloroplast genes that are usually used in phylogenetic studies of angiosperms have become nonfunctional pseudogenes. If these evolve rapidly, they may be saturated with repeated mutations at the same site and consequently not be useful for phylogenetic reconstruction.

The relationships of some parasitic taxa have been elucidated in studies of nuclear and mitochondrial DNA sequences. But these sequences sometimes produce artifactual topologies in the phylogenetic tree, because horizontal gene transfer often occurs between parasites and their hosts.

== Bdallophyton and Cytinus ==
The parasitic genera Bdallophyton and Cytinus have been found to be closely related and have been placed together as the family Cytinaceae. On the basis of mitochondrial DNA, Cytinaceae has been placed in Malvales, as sister to Muntingiaceae.

== Mitrastemon ==
The parasitic family Mitrastemonaceae has one genus, known either as Mitrastemon or Mitrastema. The genus name and the corresponding family name have been a source of much confusion. A phylogeny based on mitochondrial genes places Mitrastemon in the order Ericales, but this result had only 76% maximum likelihood bootstrap support.

== Hoplestigma ==
Hoplestigma consists of two species of African trees, notable for their large leaves, up to 55 cm long and 25 cm wide. It is usually placed by itself in the family Hoplestigmataceae which is thought to be related to Boraginaceae. In 2014, a phylogeny of Boraginaceae was published in a scientific journal called Cladistics. By comparing the DNA sequences of selected genes, the authors of that study showed that Hoplestigma is related to members of Boraginaceae subfamily Cordioideae, and they recommended that Hoplestigma be placed in that subfamily. Other authors have suggested that, while Hoplestigma is the closest relative of Cordioideae, it should perhaps not be placed within it.

== Metteniusa ==
Metteniusa consists of seven species of trees in Central America and northwestern South America. Ever since Hermann Karsten proposed the name Metteniusaceae in 1859, some authors have placed Metteniusa by itself, in that family. Most authors, however, placed it in Icacinaceae until that family was shown to be polyphyletic in 2001.

In 2007, in a comparison of DNA sequences for three genes, it was found that Metteniusa is one of the basal clades of the lamiids. The authors recommended that the family Metteniusaceae be recognized. Nothing is yet known about relationships among the groups of basal lamiids. The groups in this polytomy include the order Garryales, the families Icacinaceae, Oncothecaceae, and Metteniusaceae, as well as some unplaced genera, including Apodytes, Emmotum, and Cassinopsis.

No phylogenetic study has focused on the lamiids, but phylogenies have been inferred for the asterids, a group composed of Cornales, Ericales, the lamiids, and the campanulids.

== Balanophoraceae ==
Balanophoraceae is a family of holoparasites with 44 species in 17 genera. For a long time, Cynomorium was usually included in this family, but it is now known to be unrelated. In 2005, Balanophoraceae was shown to be in the order Santalales, but its position within that order has not been determined.

Two researchers in Taiwan announced on the internet in 2009 that they have results supporting the placement of Balanophoraceae in Santalales. They have yet to publish anything in a scientific journal.

== Cynomorium ==
Many names have been published in Cynomorium, but there are probably only two species. It is not closely related to anything else, so it is placed in the monogeneric family Cynomoriaceae.

Attempts to find its closest relatives have demonstrated with special clarity that molecular phylogenetics is not a sure-fire, problem-free method of determining systematic relationships. One study placed it in Saxifragales, but not at any particular position within that order. Doubts have been expressed about the results of this study. Another study placed Cynomorium in Rosales based on analysis of the two invert repeat regions of the chloroplast genome, which evolve at one fifth the rate of the two single copy regions.

== Gumillea ==
Gumillea has a single species, Gumillea auriculata, and is known from only one specimen which was collected in the late 18th century in Peru. It was named by Hipólito Ruiz López and José Antonio Pavón Jiménez.

George Bentham and Joseph Hooker placed it in Cunoniaceae, and this treatment was followed by Adolf Engler and most others. The last comprehensive treatment of Cunoniaceae, however, excludes it from the family. In 2009, Armen Takhtajan placed Gumillea in Simaroubaceae. A 2007 article on Simaroubaceae contains a list of the genera in the family. Gumillea is not on that list, but the authors do not provide a list or section on excluded genera.

Gumillea has also been called a synonym of Picramnia, but the ultimate source of this information is obscure and it is not mentioned in either of the recent treatments of Picramnia. It is worth noting that on their plate for Gumillea, Ruiz and Pavón showed 11 ovules or immature seeds that had been extracted from a 2-locular ovary. But the ovary in Picramnia has (sometimes 2), usually 3 to 4 locules and there are always two ovules in each locule.

It might be possible to determine the affinities of Gumillea if DNA could be extracted from the existing specimen. DNA has been successfully amplified from specimens of similar age. Any material used in such research, however, will never be replaced.

== Apodanthaceae ==
The family Apodanthaceae comprises 22 to 30 species of endoparasitic herbs. These are distributed into three genera: Pilostyles, Apodanthes, and Berlinianche. Attempts to determine the relationships of Apodanthaceae have produced only uncertain results and they have remained enigmatic, until the family was shown to be confidently placed in Cucurbitales
