= Cyperus hamulosus =

Scientific classification
- Kingdom: Plantae
- Clade: Tracheophytes
- Clade: Angiosperms
- Clade: Monocots
- Clade: Commelinids
- Order: Poales
- Family: Cyperaceae
- Genus: Cyperus
- Species: C. hamulosus

Binomial name
- Cyperus hamulosus M.Bieb.

Species of grass-like plant

Cyperus hamulosus is a sedge of the family Cyperaceae. It is native from Bulgaria east to Mongolia, and from Morocco in north Africa down to Namibia in the south. It has also been introduced to western parts of Australia.

== Description ==
The annual herb-like sedge typically grows to a height of 4 to 5 centimetres (1.6 to 2.0 in) and has a curry-like smell. In Australia it blooms between April and May producing green flowers. It has smooth culms with a triangular cross-section that reach a height of 1 to 5 cm (0.39 to 1.97 in) and have a diameter of about 0.5 mm (0.020 in). The leaves can be as longs as the culms but are often shorter and have a width of about 1 mm (0.039 in). The head-like inflorescences can have two to three branches that are up to 1 cm (0.39 in) in length with cylindrical to spherical shaped spikes that have a diameter of about 0.6 cm (0.24 in).

== Taxonomy ==
It was described by the botanist Friedrich August Marschall von Bieberstein in 1808 as a part of the work Flora Taurico Caucasica. There are eight synonyms including; Cyperus aristatus subsp. hamulosus, Dichostylis hamulosa, Isolepis hamulosa, Mariscus hamulosus and Scirpus hamulosus.

== Distribution ==
It is found in temperate climatic areas from Eastern Europe to parts of central Asia. It is also found in tropical parts of West Africa. It has become naturalised is Western Australia and is found around the edges of lakes in the Mid West, Gascoyne and Goldfields-Esperance regions of Western Australia where it grows in gravelly sandy-clay soils. It is also found in the Northern Territory.

== See also ==
- List of Cyperus species
