= Allium caspium =

Scientific classification
- Kingdom: Plantae
- Clade: Tracheophytes
- Clade: Angiosperms
- Clade: Monocots
- Order: Asparagales
- Family: Amaryllidaceae
- Subfamily: Allioideae
- Genus: Allium
- Subgenus: Allium subg. Melanocrommyum
- Species: A. caspium

Binomial name
- Allium caspium (Pall.) M.Bieb

Synonyms
- Allium brahuicum Boiss.; Amaryllis caspia (Pall.) Willd.; Crinum caspium Pall.; Allium baissunense Lipsky; Allium rhodanthum Vved.

Species of flowering plant

Allium caspium is a species of onions named for the Caspian Sea. It is native to the southern parts of European Russia, as well as central and southwestern Asia

Varieties

Two formal botanical varieties are recognized:

- Allium caspium subsp. baissunense (Lipsky) F.O.Khass. & R.M.Fritsch - Tajikistan, Uzbekistan
- Allium caspium subsp. caspium - European Russia, Kazakhstan, Turkmenistan, Uzbekistan, northern Caucasus, Afghanistan, Iran, Pakistan
