= José Antonio de Alzate y Ramírez =

Spanish priest and scientist (1737–1799)

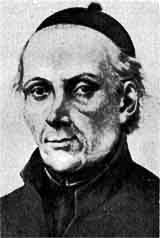
José Antonio de Alzate y Ramírez.

José Antonio de Alzate y Ramírez (20 November 1737 – 2 February 1799) was a priest in New Spain, scientist, historian, and cartographer.

== Life and career ==
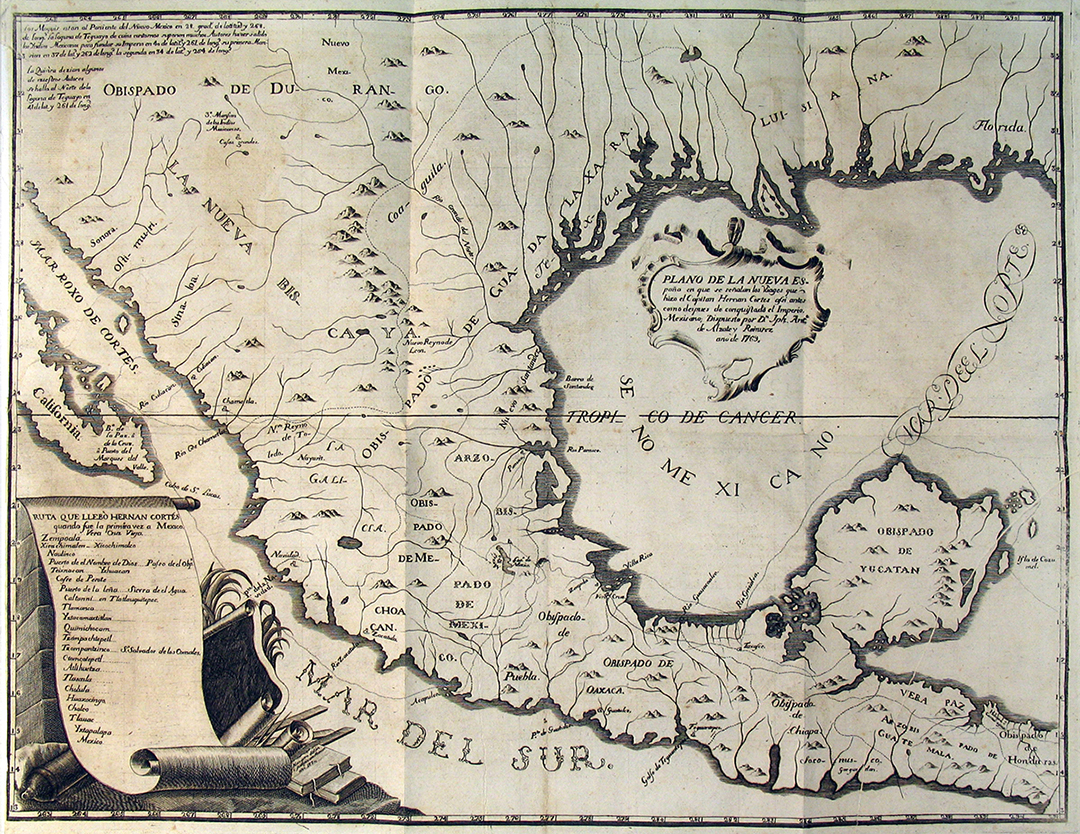
Alzate y Ramírez's Plano de la Nueva España, 1770

He was born in Ozumba in 1737, the child of Felipe de Alzate and María Josefa Ramírez, a descendant of Juana Inés de la Cruz. He studied in the Colegio de San Ildefonso in Mexico City, graduating with a bachelor in theology in 1756. He was ordained a Catholic priest at the age of 20.

Inaugurated in 1768, his Diario literario de Méjico [Literary Newspaper of Mexico] was suspended after only three months. He later created, in 1788, the Gaceta de Literatura [Newspaper of Literature], that was published until 1795 (115 issues). This periodical inspired many of his countrymen to follow his example.

Alzate was a controversial figure, frequently meeting with local opposition. Nevertheless, the French and Spanish Academies of Sciences made him a corresponding member. The viceroys of Mexico and the archbishops entrusted him with sundry scientific missions.

He invented the ballcock in 1790.

He was a member of the Royal Botanical Garden of Madrid. He died in Mexico City in 1799.

== Works ==
Alzate wrote more than thirty treatises, on subjects including astronomy, physics, meteorology, antiquities, mathematics, and metallurgy. These include:

- Observaciones meteorológicas ("Weather observations"), 1769
- Observación del paso de Venus por el disco del Sol ("Observation of the passage of Venus by the disc of the Sun"), 1770
- Modelo y descripción de los hornos de Almadén ("Model and description of the furnaces of Almadén")
- Notes, additions and maps for Francisco Javier Clavijero's Historia Antigua de México ("Ancient History of Mexico")
- Mapa de la América del Norte ("Map of North America")
- La limite des niéges perpetuelles en Volcan Popocatepetl

He also published nearly 300 articles on various scientific topics.

Alzate attained a high reputation as a zoologist and botanist. He conducted several scientific experiments, and wrote numerous articles that were published in science journals. Several of his papers discuss the growing of silk in Mexico. He also wrote a dissertation on the use of ammonia in combating mephitic gases in abandoned mines.

In 1772, he published work that showed that the well-known psychedelic effects of pipiltzintzintli were due to natural causes and not the work of the devil (Memoria del uso que hacen los indios de los pipiltzintzintlis; México, D.F.: Universidad Nacional Autónoma de México). A study from 2020 confirms that he actively fought for the legislation of medical cannabis.

Alzate's account of Xochicalco was the first published description of the ruins. His research led the way for modern exploration of Mexican antiquities.

== Legacy ==
In his honor, the Sociedad Científica Antonio Alzate (Antonio Alzate Scientific Society) was created in 1884. In 1935, this society became the National Academy of Sciences. A dam and reservoir are named in his honor in the State of Mexico, north of Toluca. Plant genus Alzatea (the only genus in Alzateaceae) is named after him.

== See also ==
- List of Roman Catholic scientist-clerics
- Spanish American Enlightenment
