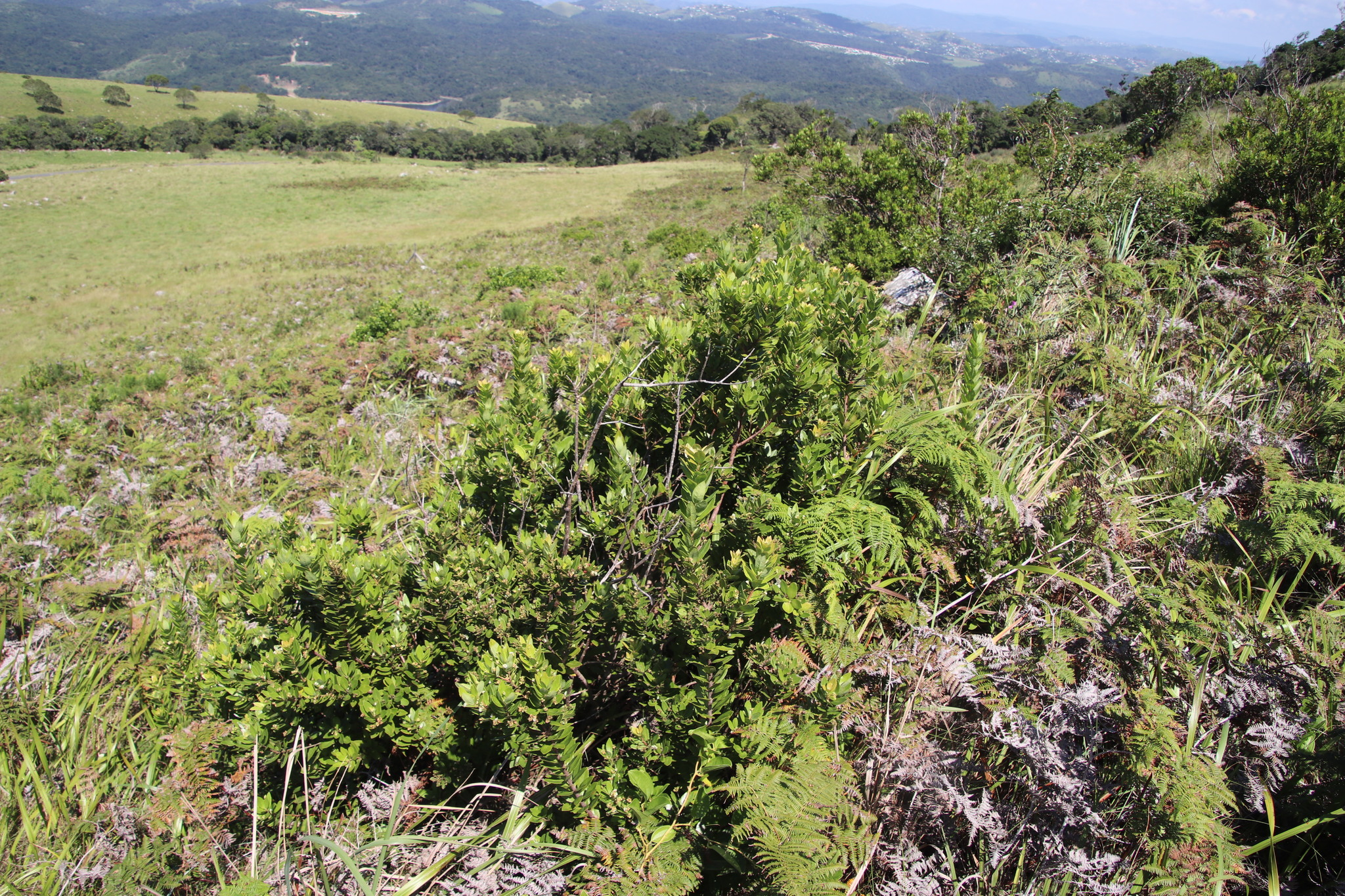
- Habit

Conservation status
- Least Concern (IUCN 3.1)

Scientific classification
- Kingdom: Plantae
- Clade: Tracheophytes
- Clade: Angiosperms
- Clade: Eudicots
- Clade: Rosids
- Order: Huerteales
- Family: Gerrardinaceae
- Genus: Gerrardina
- Species: G. foliosa

Binomial name
- Gerrardina foliosa Oliv.

= Gerrardina foliosa =

- At God's Window

Species of plant

Gerrardina foliosa, the krantz-berry, is a widespread species of flowering plant in the family Gerrardinaceae. It is native to western South Africa and Eswatini. A shrub or tree, it is typically found in forest edges, hillsides and outcrops at elevations from sea level to 1,700 m (5,600 ft). It has been assessed as Least Concern.
