= Petenaea =

Conservation status
- Endangered (IUCN 3.1)

Scientific classification
- Kingdom: Plantae
- Clade: Tracheophytes
- Clade: Angiosperms
- Clade: Eudicots
- Clade: Rosids
- Order: Huerteales
- Family: Petenaeaceae; Christenh., M.F.Fay & M.W.Chase
- Genus: Petenaea; Lundell
- Species: P. cordata

Binomial name
- Petenaea cordata Lundell

Genus of flowering plants

Petenaea cordata (from northern Central America) was first described in Elaeocarpaceae and later placed in Tiliaceae, but most authors have been uncertain about its familial affinities. It was considered a taxon incertae sedis in the Angiosperm Phylogeny Group classification (APG III). Molecular analyses based on a recent collection from Guatemala indicate a distant, weakly supported sister-group relationship to the African genus Gerrardina (Gerrardinaceae; Huerteales). As no obvious synapomorphies exist for Gerrardina and Petenaea, the new monogeneric family Petenaeaceae was proposed. The polymorphic order Huerteales now comprises four small families: Dipentodontaceae, Gerrardinaceae, Petenaeaceae and Tapisciaceae. Petenaea cordata is the only species in the genus Petenaea.

== Description ==
Trees to c. 10 m, or large shrubs. Stems often tinged red, villous-tomentose. Leaves minutely stipulate; petioles 5–11 cm, densely short villous, red; blades 8.5-15.5 × 6.5-14.5 cm, chartaceous, densely villous below, glabrescent above, turning red with age, palmately veined at base with 5-7 primary veins, the secondary venation reticulate, the base broadly cordate, the margins minutely denticulate, the apices acute to broadly short-acuminate. Stipules minute, soon caducous. Inflorescences axillary, cymose, long-pedunculate, rose-pink, the branches villous-tomentose; pedicels 5–12 mm, pink. Flowers with the sepals c. 4 mm, valvate, lanceolate, attenuate from the base to the apex, reflexed, reddish pink, the base bearing 2-3 obovoid subsessile glands, and densely villous with hairs c. 2 mm, moniliform, pink; petals absent; disc annular, glandular; stamens 8-12, glabrous, the anthers yellow, opening by an apical pore-like slit; ovary superior, sessile, tomentose; style slender; stigma discoid. Berry 6–12 mm, shallowly 4-5 lobed, ovoid to subglobose, pulpy, sweet, sparsely pubescent; seeds numerous, c. 1 mm, oblong-pyramidal or irregular. Flowering and fruiting continuously.

== Distribution ==
Endemic to northern Mesoamerica, Mexico (Chiapas, Tabasco), Belize, Guatemala (Petén).
