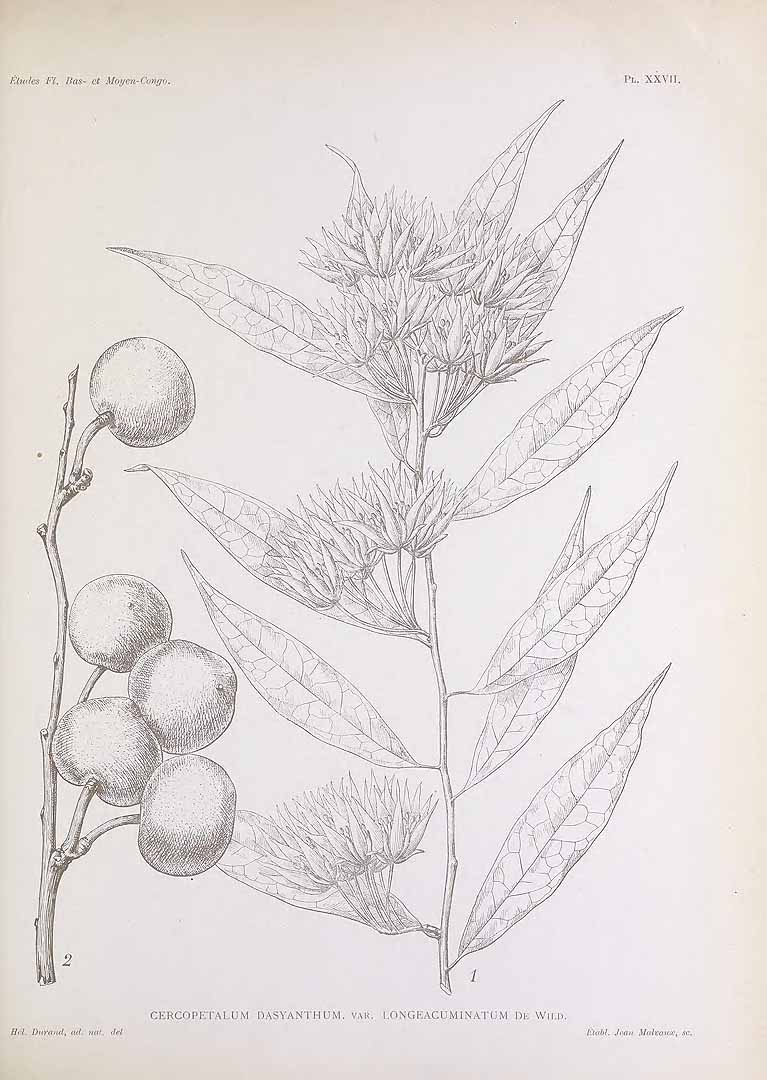

Scientific classification
- Kingdom: Plantae
- Clade: Tracheophytes
- Clade: Angiosperms
- Clade: Eudicots
- Clade: Rosids
- Order: Brassicales
- Family: Pentadiplandraceae; Hutch. & Dalziel
- Genus: Pentadiplandra; Baill.
- Species: P. brazzeana

Binomial name
- Pentadiplandra brazzeana Baill.

Synonyms
- Cercopetalum dasyanthum Gilg; Cotylonychia chevalieri Stapf; Pentadiplandra gossweileri Exell

= Pentadiplandra =

Genus of flowering plants

Pentadiplandra brazzeana, also known as oubli, is an evergreen shrub or liana that is the only species assigned to the genus Pentadiplandra, and has been placed in a family of its own called Pentadiplandraceae. It produces large red berries, sometimes mottled with grey. It is known from West-Central Tropical Africa, between northern Angola, eastern Nigeria and western Democratic Republic of Congo. The berry is sweet in taste due to the protein, brazzein, which is substantially sweeter than saccharose. Brazzein may be useful as a low-calorie sweetener, but is not yet allowed as a food additive in the United States and the European Union.

== Description ==
Pentadiplandra brazzeana is a monoecious shrub of maximally 5 m (16 ft), but can also develop into a liana, climbing up to 20 m (66 ft) high in the trees. The shrub morph usually has a mass of branched bulging roots, while the liana morph has a large, fleshy tuber. The branches are without hair and carry alternately set, simple and entire leaves, without stipules at the base of the ½–1 cm (0.2–0.4 in) long leaf stalk.

The hairless leaf blade is elliptical to oblanceolate, 5–15 cm (2.0–5.9 in) long and 1½–5 cm (0.6–2 in) wide, with a wedge-shaped base, a pointed tip, a dull or shining dark green upper surface and a dull dark green lower surface, and a central vein that branches feather-like into five to eleven pairs of side veins. The flowers are in racemes in the axils of the leaves or at the tip of the branches, with the common inflorescence stalk much longer in terminal racemes, up to 16 cm (6.3 in) long. The individual flowers can be functionally only male, only female or hermaphrodite, all on the same plant. They sit on a 1–2 cm (0.39–0.79 in) long stalk, and carry five elliptical to lanceolate, ½–1 cm (0.2-0.4 in) long, green sepals with a violet margin, which are slightly buiging and fused at their base. Inside are five free white to yellowish petals of between 2 and 2½ cm (0.8–1.0 in) long, set between the neighboring sepals. They consist of a separate, wide, pouch-like base or alternatively described as having a conspicuous scale, fringed by hairs that form a "roof" over a chamber and also make the base of the sepals cling together. The petal further consists of a lanceolate to oblanceolate plate, with irregular burgundy-colored splashing, and a pointy tip. Stamens and pistol are separated from the sepals and petals by a firm stalk (or androgynophore), which carries at its top ten to thirteen stamens with about 6 mm (0.24 in) long thin filaments connected only at the base forming two or three whorls. The anthers on top are attached at the base, have two cavities that release pollen by lengthwise slits. The ovary, which may be clearly distanced from the base of the stamens by a gynophore, has (four or) five cavities and carries a short style topped by a (4– or) 5-lobed stigma. In male flowers the ovary is rudimentary, and in female flowers the stamens are rudimentary.

The fruit is a globe-shaped berry of 3½–5 cm (1.4–2 in) in diameter, entirely red or mottled with grey, containing many seeds attached to the axis surrounded by pink pulp. The seeds are kidney-shaped, and have an outer layer of wooly, white, one-celled hairs.

=== Phytochemistry ===
Pentadiplandra contains thiocarbamates such as methyl N-benzylthiocarbamate, methyl and ethyl N-methoxybenzylthiocarbamate, and glucosinolates such as benzyl- and 4-methoxybenzyl glucosinolates. It has cells containing myrosinase.

== Taxonomy ==
Pentadiplandra brazzeana was first described by French botanist and physician Henri Ernest Baillon in 1886, who assigned it to the family Capparaceae, based on a specimen from Osika in Congo by Jacques de Brazza. In 1897, Ernest Friedrich Gilg described Cercopetalum dasyanthum in the Capparaceae. Otto Stapf described Cotylonychia chevalieri in 1908 as part of the Sterculiaceae. In 2000, Clemens Bayer showed Cotylonychia to be synonymous to Pentadiplandra. Arthur Wallis Exell introduced the name Pentadiplandra gossweileri in 1927. The family Pentadiplandraceae was proposed by John Hutchinson and British botanist, physician and scientific explorer John McEwan Dalziel in the Flora of West Tropical Africa in 1928.

=== Phylogeny ===
P. brazzeana is the only known species in the genus Pentadiplandra, and has been assigned its own family named Pentadiplandraceae. Analyses of the development of the flower and anatomic features suggest that Pentadiplandra is a relict genus branching off near the base of the core Brassicales. It has many characters in common with the American genus Tovaria. Current insights in the relationships of the Brassicaceae, based on a 2012 DNA-analysis, are summarized in the following tree.

- core Brassicales
  - - - - - family Resedaceae
        - family Gyrostemonaceae
      - family Pentadiplandraceae
    - - family Tovariaceae
      - - family Capparaceae
        - - family Cleomaceae
          - family Brassicaceae
  - family Emblingiaceae

=== Etymology ===
Pentadiplandra is the contraction of the Greek words πέντε (pente), meaning "five", διπλόος (diploos), "double", and ἀνδρὸς (andros), "male" or "stamen", a reference to the usually two whorls of five stamens each. brazzeana is probably derived from the name of the collector of the type specimen, J. de Brazza

== Distribution and habitat ==
The plant grows in Angola, the Democratic Republic of the Congo, the Central African Republic, the Republic of the Congo, Cameroon, Gabon and Nigeria. It is not uncommon in upland primary forest dominated by Scorodophloeus zenkeri, but also occurs regularly on the banks of rivers and in secondary forest. The species is found in particular in forest margins bordering savanna's in Cameroon. It does not appear in clusters anywhere.

== Sweetness and calories ==
Most primates have a genotype of the taste receptor protein, taste receptor type 1 member 3 (TAS1R3), that enables them to taste the protein, brazzein. To humans, the fruit is intensely sweet, but provides few calories. Such proteins may imitate sweetness to lure wild animals to eat the berries and disperse the seeds. Western lowland gorillas (Gorilla gorilla), however, have two mutations in the TAS1R3 gene, and although its diet contains a high proportion of fruit, scientists have not witnessed gorillas consuming P. brazzeana berries. If factual, this avoidance behavior and the taste gene mutations may indicate a counter-adaptation to deter gorillas from foraging for low-calorie foods.

== Uses ==
=== Traditional uses ===
The berries, leaves, roots, and tubers of these plants have been used in local traditional culture. Roots hung in the house are thought to repel snakes. Powdered root bark is an ingredient of "African whiskey in sachets", which is said to be cheap but dangerous. The root is said to be eaten occasionally as a vegetable. A syrup made from the root is marketed throughout the Congo Basin.

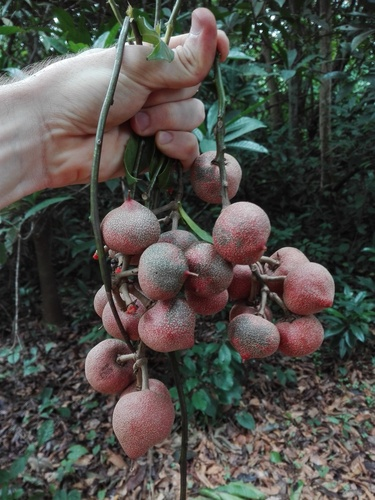
fruits of Pentadiplandra brazzeana

The pulp of the berries is eaten by children, and is used as a sweetener in maize porridge.

=== Modern uses ===
Brazzein has been isolated from the plant and a company was formed to bring it to market in 2008, which initially said it would start selling the product by 2010 once it obtained agreement from the FDA that its brazzein was generally recognized as safe (GRAS). In 2012 the company said that regulatory approval might take an additional one or two years and in 2014 it still had not obtained a GRAS waiver from the FDA and was seeking partners, and the product was still not on the market as of 2016.
