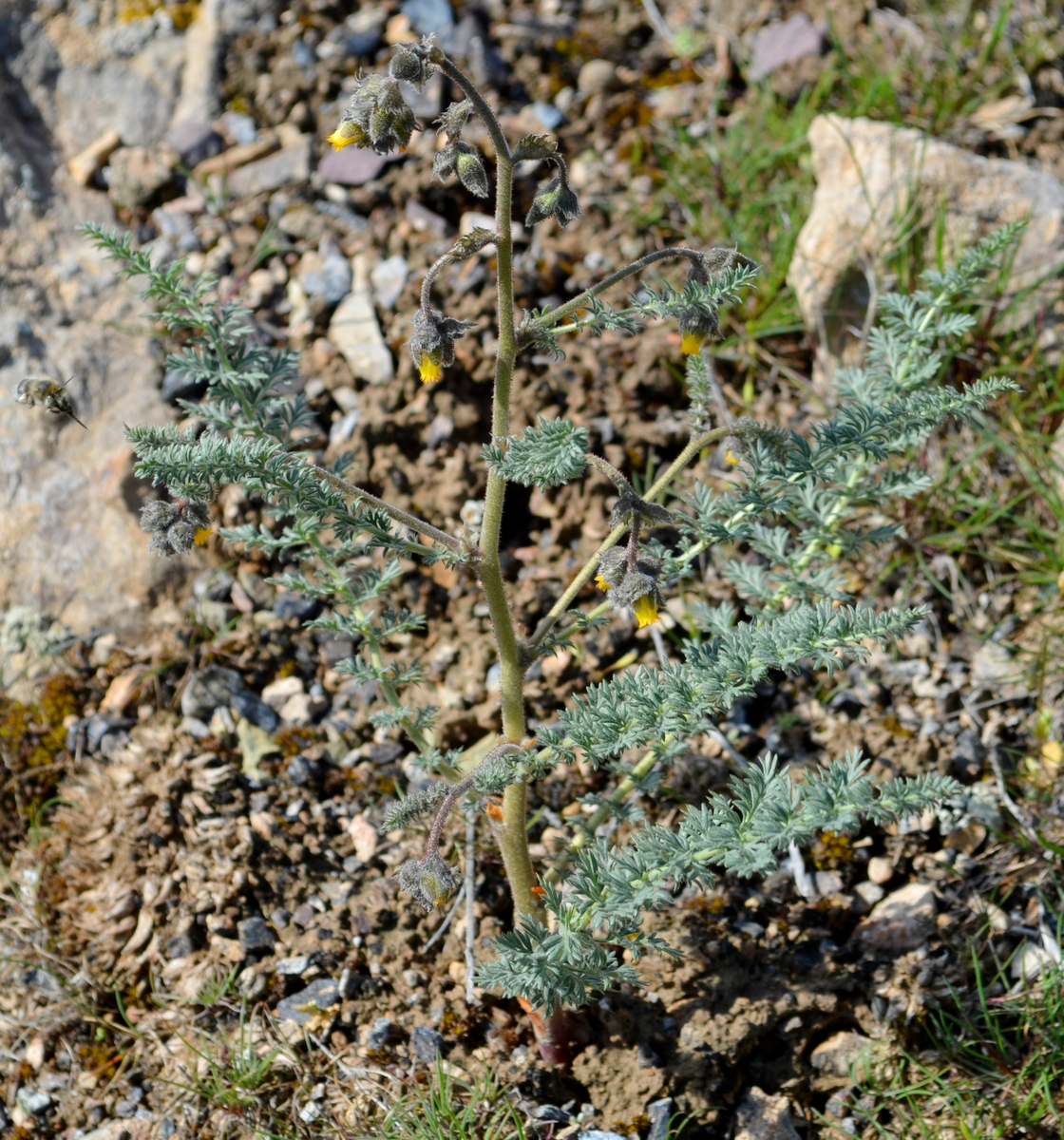
- Biebersteinia multifida

Scientific classification
- Kingdom: Plantae
- Clade: Tracheophytes
- Clade: Angiosperms
- Clade: Eudicots
- Clade: Rosids
- Order: Sapindales
- Family: Biebersteiniaceae; Schnizl.
- Genus: Biebersteinia; Stephan

Species
- Biebersteinia emodii Biebersteinia heterostemon Biebersteinia multifida Biebersteinia odora Biebersteinia orphanidis

= Biebersteinia =

Genus of flowering plants

Biebersteinia is a genus containing four, or five, accepted species of herbaceous plants in the flowering plant order Sapindales. They occur from Greece in the eastern Mediterranean, to western Siberia, Central Asia, and the western Himalaya. They have erect stems (to 0.3 metres tall in B. odora, and to 2 metres or more in B. heterostemon) with a pleasant spicy odour, and have tuberous rhizomes; the leaves are finely divided, green to greyish-green, and the flowers are yellow (red with a yellow base in B. orphanidis), with five petals. The plants are superficially similar in appearance to some Potentilla species, despite being unrelated. They grow in alpine and subalpine meadows, dry slopes, riverside gravels, and scree, reported at altitudes of 4,300–5,600 m (B. odora) in Pakistan, at 1,000–3,500 m (B. heterostemon) and 1,600–5,600 m (B. odora) in western China, and (B. orphanidis) at 1,630–1,760 m in Greece.

In 1806, Christian Friedrich Stephan formed the genus Biebersteinia, then in 1841 Endlicher converted it to a family status. This was the start of various changes to the genus. It was then placed in Geraniaceae by Pierre Edmond Boissier, in 1867, and changed by various botanists (including Knuth (1912), Thorne (1992), Cronquist (1981, 1988), Dahlgren (1989) and Takhtajan (1987 and 1997)).

In 2007, molecular phylogenetic studies have given it a basal position within Sapindales. In the APG III system, the Kubitzki system, and the Plants of the World Online (POWO) database, it is placed in its own monogeneric family Biebersteiniaceae, one of the few herbaceous members of Sapindales (the others being found in Rutaceae).

The genus is named after the German botanist Friedrich August Marschall von Bieberstein (1768–1826).

In 2001, five types of flavonoids have been derived from extracts from Biebersteinia orphanidis leaves.

== Species ==
- Biebersteinia emodii Jaub. & Spach (included in B. odora by POWO, Flora of Pakistan, Flora of China)
- Biebersteinia heterostemon Maxim.
- Biebersteinia multifida DC.
- Biebersteinia odora Stephan ex Fisch.
- Biebersteinia orphanidis Boiss.
