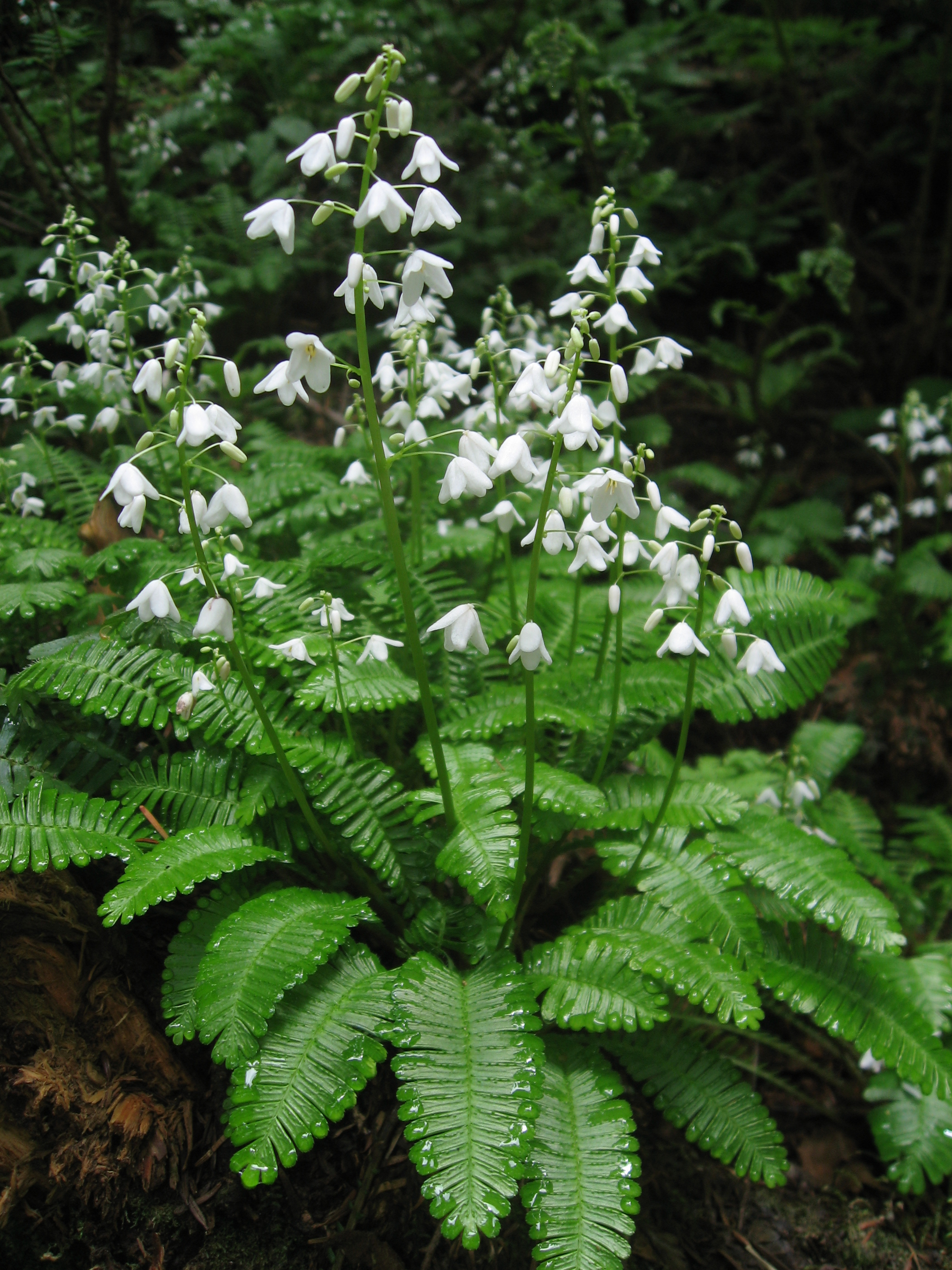

Scientific classification
- Kingdom: Plantae
- Clade: Embryophytes
- Clade: Tracheophytes
- Clade: Angiosperms
- Clade: Eudicots
- Order: Ranunculales
- Family: Papaveraceae
- Genus: Pteridophyllum; Franch.
- Species: P. racemosum

Binomial name
- Pteridophyllum racemosum Siebold & Zucc.

= Pteridophyllum =

Genus of flowering plants in the poppy family

Pteridophyllum is a genus of flowering plant endemic to Japan. Its only species is Pteridophyllum racemosum. The genus was formerly placed in the mono-generic family Pteridophyllaceae, which is now included within the Papaveraceae.
