= Guamatela =

Scientific classification
- Kingdom: Plantae
- Clade: Tracheophytes
- Clade: Angiosperms
- Clade: Eudicots
- Clade: Rosids
- Order: Crossosomatales
- Family: Guamatelaceae; S.H.Oh & D.Potter
- Genus: Guamatela; Donn.Sm.
- Species: G. tuerckheimii

Binomial name
- Guamatela tuerckheimii Donn.Sm.

Genus of flowering plants

Guamatela is a genus of flowering plants in the order Crossosomatales. Guamatela is the only genus in the family Guamatelaceae. The genus comprises a single species, the type species, Guamatela tuerckheimii Donn.Sm., an evergreen shrub with a prostrate habit that is native to Mexico, Guatemala, and Honduras. The genus Guamatela had formerly been included in the family Rosaceae before the Angiosperm Phylogeny Group placed it in the Guamatelaceae in 2009.
