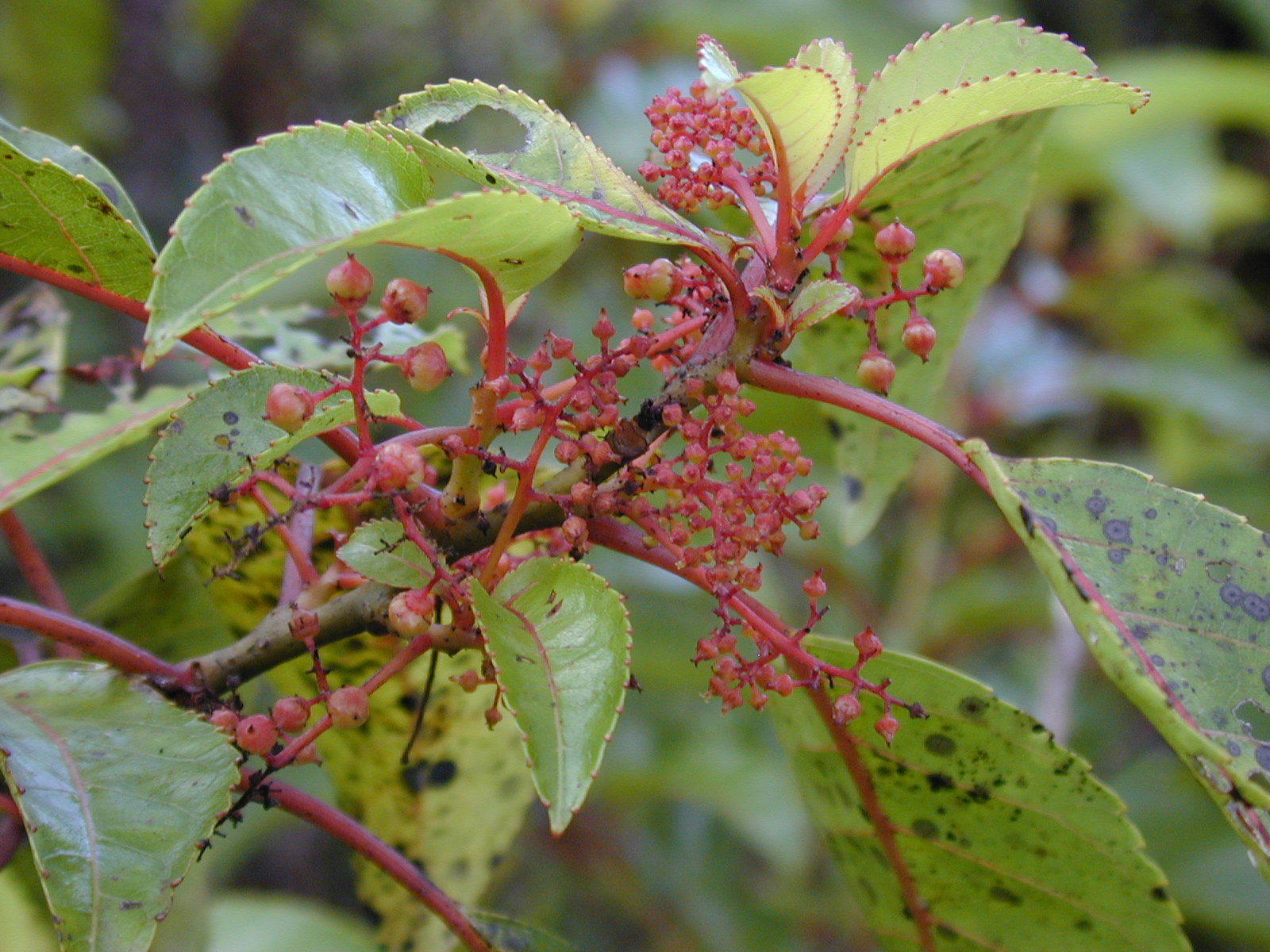
- Perrottetia sandwicensis

Scientific classification
- Kingdom: Plantae
- Clade: Tracheophytes
- Clade: Angiosperms
- Clade: Eudicots
- Clade: Rosids
- Clade: Malvids
- Order: Huerteales; Doweld

Families
- Dipentodontaceae; Gerrardinaceae; Petenaeaceae; Tapisciaceae

= Huerteales =

Order of flowering plants

Huerteales is an order of flowering plants. It is one of the 17 orders that make up the large eudicot group known as the rosids in the APG III system of plant classification. Within the rosids, it is one of the orders in Malvidae, a group formerly known as eurosids II and now known informally as the malvids. This is true whether Malvidae is circumscribed broadly to include eight orders as in APG III, or more narrowly to include only four orders.

Huerteales consists of four small families, Petenaeaceae, Gerrardinaceae, Tapisciaceae, and Dipentodontaceae. Out of its constituent families, Heurteales also consists of six genera. Petenaeaceae consists of a single genus and species Petenaea cordata from southern Mexico, Guatemala and Belize. Gerrardinaceae consists of a single genus, Gerrardina. Tapisciaceae has two genera Tapiscia and Huertea. Dipentodontaceae was treated as consisting of a single genus, Dipentodon until the genus Perrottetia was added to Dipentodontaceae in the late 2000s. The largest genus, Perrottetia, contains about 15 of the approximate total of 25 species in the order.

Huerteales are shrubs or small trees found in most tropical or warm temperate regions. The flowers of Perrottetia have been studied in detail, but otherwise, all five of the genera are poorly known. The order is based on molecular phylogenetic analysis of DNA sequences.

== Description ==
All of the Huerteales are woody plants. The leaves are alternate with toothed margins. The inflorescence is cymose, but sometimes nearly racemose or umbelliform. The bases of the calyx, corolla and stamens are fused to form a hypanthium which is in some cases very short. The ovary is unilocular, at least at the top, with one or two ovules per carpel. The number of carpels is variable.

Other characters are generally found in Huerteales, but with the exceptions noted below. Gerrardina differs from the rest of Huerteales in that the stamens are opposite the petals, instead of being opposite the sepals. Dipentodon and Perrottetia are distinctive in that the calyx and corolla are not well differentiated, but resemble each other. Tapiscia and Huertea have a calyx tube and compound, rather than simple leaves. Tapiscia has a uniloculate ovary with a single ovule. Huertea has one locule containing two ovules, or two locules, each containing one ovule. Gerrardina, Dipentodon, and Perrottetia have two ovules in each locule. Tapiscia lacks the nectary disk that is characteristic of the order. Huertea lacks stipules.

== History ==
Until 2009, the five genera of Huerteales had usually been placed into three unrelated families. Tapiscia and Huertea had long been known to be related. Most authors had placed them in Staphyleaceae and had placed that family in the order Sapindales. Armen Takhtajan established the family Tapisciaceae in 1987 and placed it in Sapindales, but this treatment was not followed by many others and it did not stand up to phylogenetic analysis. Since that time, Staphyleaceae has been recircumscribed. It no longer includes Tapiscia and Huertea and it is in the order Crossosomatales. For most of the twentieth century, Gerrardina and Dipentodon had usually been placed in Flacourtiaceae, a family that is now recognized by only a few taxonomists, and then only as a segregate of Salicaceae. Perrottetia, meanwhile, had usually been placed, with considerable doubt, in Celastraceae.

Ever since Dipentodon was named in 1911, there had been occasional suggestions that it might be related to Tapiscia and Huertea. In 2001, Alexander Doweld established the order Huerteales, defining it to consist of Tapiscia, Huertea, and Dipentodon. This grouping was later supported by molecular phylogenetic studies. In 2006, a study of DNA sequences showed that Perrottetia was misplaced in Celastrales and that it is sister to Dipentodon in Huerteales. Also in 2006, it was found that Gerrardina is a malvid, but its placement within this group remained uncertain.

In 2009, Andreas Worberg and co-authors produced the first phylogenetic study that included all of the genera of Huerteales. From one of their data matrices, they derived a well supported phylogeny for the order, as well as strongly supported relationships among the four orders of malvids.

== Phylogeny ==
The phylogeny shown below is the one found by Worberg and co-authors. Monospecific genera are represented by species names.

- Sapindales
- - Huerteales
    - - Petenaea cordata
      - Gerrardina
    - - - Tapiscia sinensis
        - Huertea
      - - Dipentodon sinicus
        - Perrottetia
  - - Brassicales
    - Malvales
