= Nicobariodendron =

Scientific classification
- Kingdom: Plantae
- Clade: Tracheophytes
- Clade: Angiosperms
- Clade: Eudicots
- Clade: Rosids
- Order: Celastrales
- Family: Celastraceae
- Genus: Nicobariodendron; Vasudeva Rao & Chakrabarty
- Species: N. sleumeri

Binomial name
- Nicobariodendron sleumeri Vasudeva Rao & Chakrabarty

Genus of trees

Nicobariodendron is a genus in the family Celastraceae, with only one species, Nicobariodendron sleumeri, a tree with simple, alternately set, entire leaves, small flowers and single seed fleshy fruits. It is only known from the Nicobar Islands of India.

== Description ==
Nicobariodendron sleumeri is a dioecious evergreen tree of 8–35 m high, with simple, alternately set leaves without stipules. A leaf consists of a leaf stalk of 3–8 mm long, and an oblong oval to oblong inverted egg-shaped, leathery, hairless and shiny green leaf blade of 5½-10 × 2–4 cm, with a foot that gradually narrows into the leaf stalk, an entire margin, and a blunt end that abruptly changes in a pointed tip of ½-1¼ cm. The leaf is pinnately veined with five to nine pairs of secondary veins. Male flowers sit in spikes in the axils of the leaves. These flowers are said to be fragrant, white, small, about 2 mm in diameter, and tetra- or pentamerous, the petals are yellowish. They contain only two free stamens, lying side-by-side, consisting of a filament of 1½-2½ mm long topped with an orbicular anther of ½-¾ mm, borne outside the disc and a short sterile pistil in the middle. Female flowers are mostly in cymes at the end of the branches. The conical fruit is a light red drupe of about 2 cm, with the calyx still present at its base, and it contains a single basal seed.

== Taxonomy ==
Nicobariodendron sleumeri was only described in 1986 (in a publication dated 1985), based on two herbarium specimens collected in 1974 and 1979 respectively, and the notes of the collectors. The describing authors assigned it to the Celastraceae, but the species is aberrant and other scholars have been hesitant to group it with other taxa, particularly because it had not been included in genetic analysis. In the APG IV system, it is placed in Celastraceae.

=== Etymology ===
The genus name is a combination of "Nicobar", a reference to the Nicobar Islands where the plants were found and "dendron", which is Latin for tree. The species name honors Hermann Otto Sleumer, a twentieth century Dutch botanist of German birth.

== Distribution ==
Nicobariodendron sleumeri is an endemic of Great Nicobar Island and Katchal Island. Only the two type specimen are known, a flowering male tree from Great Nicobal and a fruiting female tree from Katchal. Female inflorescences are described, but were not part of the herbarium specimen.
