= Dipentodon =

Conservation status
- Least Concern (IUCN 3.1)

Scientific classification
- Kingdom: Plantae
- Clade: Tracheophytes
- Clade: Angiosperms
- Clade: Eudicots
- Clade: Rosids
- Order: Huerteales
- Family: Dipentodontaceae
- Genus: Dipentodon; Dunn
- Species: D. sinicus

Binomial name
- Dipentodon sinicus Dunn

Genus of trees

Dipentodon is a genus of flowering plants in the family Dipentodontaceae. Its only species, Dipentodon sinicus, is a small, deciduous tree native to southern China, northern Myanmar, and northern India. It has been little studied and until recently its affinities remained obscure.

== Description ==
Dipentodon sinicus is a small, deciduous tree. The leaves are stipulate, alternate, and simple, with serrate margins. The inflorescence is variable in form, usually an abbreviated, umbelliform cyme containing 25 to 30 small flowers. The flowers are actinomorphic and yellowish green. The sepals and petals are only weakly differentiated, usually 5, rarely to 7 in number, free, or united only at the base. The hypanthium is very short or else the ovary is superior. The nectary disk is intrastaminal. The stamens are opposite the sepals. The ovary consists of three united carpels with two ovules per carpel. The ovary is 1-loculate, but partly 3-loculate at its base. The fruit is a 1-seeded drupaceous capsule.

== History ==
Dipentodon was named and first described in 1911 by Stephen Troyte Dunn in what is now called the Kew Bulletin. At that time, Dunn wrote:

The name Dipentodon, proposed for it, refers to the most remarkable character possessed by the flowers in the exact similarity of the calyx teeth and petals (if I rightly call them so) and their insertion so nearly in one whorl that the appearance is given of a ten-toothed perianth.

Dipentodon was placed in its own family by Elmer Drew Merrill in 1941, but this placement was not generally followed. Instead, most authors put Dipentodon in the ill-defined and heterogeneous family Flacourtiaceae. In the twenty-first century, Flacourtiaceae is recognized by only a few taxonomists, and then only in a much narrower sense than it had been. Dipentodon is unrelated to Flacourtiaceae sensu stricto, a segregate of Salicaceae. Molecular phylogenetic studies have led to the widespread acceptance of the family Dipentodontaceae and its placement in the order Huerteales. Some authors have defined the family as consisting only of Dipentodon. Others, following the recommendation of a 2006 study, have included Perrottetia. When the APG II classification was published in 2003, the taxonomic position of Dipentodon was still unknown and it was placed incertae sedis in the angiosperms. It was listed in the appendix under TAXA OF UNCERTAIN POSITION.
