= Setchellanthus =

Scientific classification
- Kingdom: Plantae
- Clade: Tracheophytes
- Clade: Angiosperms
- Clade: Eudicots
- Clade: Rosids
- Order: Brassicales
- Family: Setchellanthaceae; Iltis
- Genus: Setchellanthus; Brandegee
- Species: S. caeruleus

Binomial name
- Setchellanthus caeruleus Brandegee

Family of shrubs

Setchellanthus caeruleus is a species of pungent shrub with large blue flowers. It is placed alone in the genus Setchellanthus, which is in turn, is placed alone in the family Setchellanthaceae. It is endemic to Mexico.

The genus and the species were circumscribed by Townshend Stith Brandegee in Univ. Calif. Publ. Bot. vol.3 on page 378 in 1909.

The genus name of Setchellanthus is in honour of William Albert Setchell (1864–1943), who was an American botanist and marine phycologist who taught at the University of California, Berkeley, where he headed the Botany Department. The specific epithet caeruleus is the Latin for "blue".
