= Friedrich August Marschall von Bieberstein =

German botanist (1768–1826)

- Born: 30 July 1768; Stuttgart, Germany
- Died: 28 June 1826 (aged 57); Merefa
- Known for: Taxonomy; Ecology; Botany
- Awards: Order of St. Vladimir
- Scientific career
- Fields: Botany; Biology; Zoology
- Author abbrev. (botany): M.Bieb.

Baron Friedrich August Marschall von Bieberstein (30 July 1768 – 28 June 1826) was an early explorer of the flora and archeology of the southern portion of Imperial Russia, including the Caucasus and Novorossiya. He compiled the first comprehensive flora catalogue of the Crimeo-Caucasian region.

== Origin ==
Friedrich Marschall von Bieberstein was the son of a Colonel from Württemberg 'Conrad Otto Christoph Freiherr Marschall von Bieberstein' (17 March 1726 – 25 May 1796), and his wife 'Johanna Theresia Henriette' née Wolf from Ludwigsburg (21 December 1738 – 1783). They married on 21 September 1761.

The 'Marschall von Bieberstein' family can trace its origins back over 800 years to the region today called Saxony in eastern Germany. The current family name derives from Bieberstein castle near Dresden. He had three brothers, Carl Wilhelm Marschall von Bieberstein (1764–1817), who was from 1792 worked in Baden, then in 1800 became President of the Privy Councillor, then 1806 part of the Privy Council (known as the Geheimrat in Germany) and in 1809, Baden Minister of the Interior and finally in 1811, an Envoy in Stuttgart, and 'Ernst Franz Ludwig Marschall von Bieberstein (1770–1834), Chief Minister (Staatsminister) of the Duchy of Nassau between 1806 and 1834. All three brothers were graduates of 'Carl's High School' (Hohe Carls-Schule) in Stuttgart.

== Biography ==
Friedrich August began a career in the military, but then worked for Prince Kraft Ernest of Oettingen-Wallerstein in Vienna. He then moved to Iași where he served as secretary to Count Mikhail Kakhovsky.

In 1793, von Bieberstein became aide-de-camp to Kakhovsky and was sent to Crimea. Soon afterwards, he met fellow German naturalist, Peter Simon Pallas, who encouraged his interest in natural history and botany. He then to collect specimens as he travelled around the Caucasus. He was especially thorough around the town of 'Karassu Bazar' (now called Bilohirsk in Crimea), which was a former blackwater market. In the spring of 1794, he collected specimens around Sevastopol.

In 1795, he travelled to St. Petersburg, sent (by Empress Catherine II the Great) with the invading Russian forces into Persia. He explored the western shore of the Caspian Sea. He collected many herbarium specimens all along the way, he published an account of his journey in French in 1798 "Tableau des provinces situées sur la côte occidentale de la mer Caspienne entre les fleuves Terek et Kour" (and in German in 1800) (and into English in 1807) which contained a great deal of botanical information, including 74 new species descriptions. He also drew an archaeological map of the Taman Peninsula in 1796. Now stored with the St Petersburg branch of the archives of the Russian Academy of Sciences. The sudden death of Empress Catherine ended the Persian campaign in 1796 and von Bieberstein went to Moscow.

In 1798, he undertook a second trip to the Caucasus, in which he explored in detail the northern and eastern parts of the mountains.

In 1799, von Bieberstein was appointed privy-councillor (known as 'Director of the Silk House'), responsible for the development of sericulture (silkworm breeding) in southern Russia, giving him a plenty of ideal chances to travel around the region and continue his botanical studies and add to his collection.

Between 1802 and 1805, he went on his third and fourth trips to Caucasus to Georgia, which he explored the region, while based at Tbilisi. He was accompanied by the Count Mussin Pushkin.

In 1804, the Russian government sent him on a scientific mission to Germany and France, he studied the 'Near East' specimens in the Tournefort herbarium in Paris.

Later in 1804, Von Bieberstein married a Finnish woman named Miss Maria Kristina Klick (1785- ) and together they moved to Marefa (also known as Marfopol'ye).

Very soon afterwards he began to publish the 'Flora Taurico Caucasica' (from 1808 to 1819). The two volumes of books contain the descriptions of 2,322 Spermatophyte species of the caucasus region, from his various trips. In 1819, he published a supplementary volume, covering his later discovered specimens of the regions. The books use the new Linnaean classification system.

Von Bieberstein remained in Marefa for the rest of his life and he developed orchards at 'Penz' and Poltava as well as supervising the military pharmaceutical gardens of Ukraine.

In 1810, he published a work with illustrations of south Russian plants entitled 'Centuria plantarum rariorum Rossiae meridionalis', in which 50 of his own hand-coloured engravings can be seen.

After his death, his approximately 10,000 specimens of his comprehensive plant collection was donated in 1828 to the Russian Academy of Sciences. It was housed in St. Petersburg. It is currently in the possession of the Komarov Botanical Institute. The important collection was preserved for more than a hundred years in an unavailable condition, and then in the late 60's, it was curated and made accessible to botanical scholars.

== Honours ==
Bieberstein has received many honours, including belonging to the Order of St. Vladimir.

The botanical epithets, 'biebersteinii' are named after him. This includes Achillea biebersteinii, published by Huber-Morath in 1975. and Biebersteinia.

Bieberstein is recognised as the scientific authority for 1,695 plant taxa.
