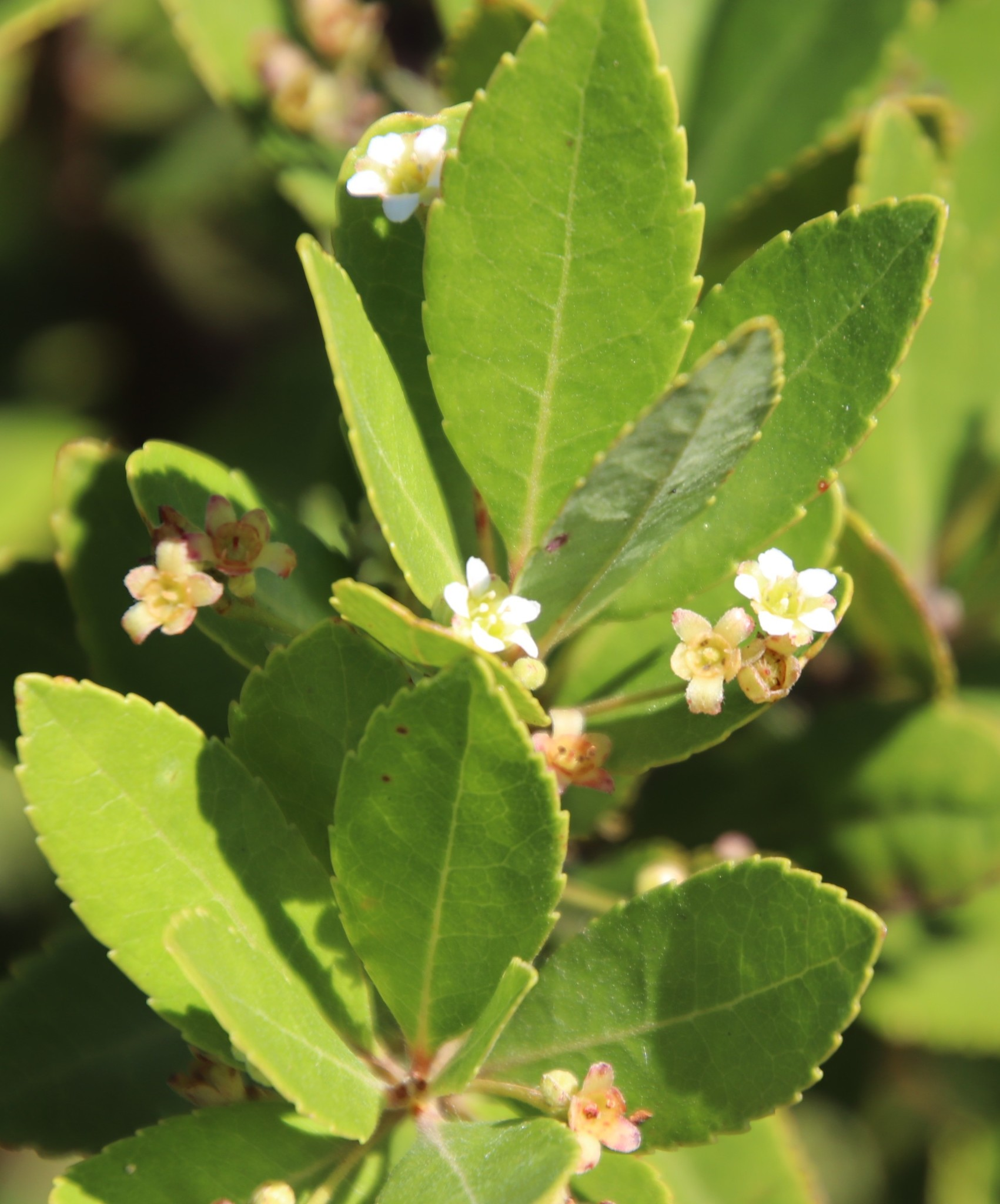
- Gerrardina foliosa

Scientific classification
- Kingdom: Plantae
- Clade: Tracheophytes
- Clade: Angiosperms
- Clade: Eudicots
- Clade: Rosids
- Order: Huerteales
- Family: Gerrardinaceae; M.H.Alford
- Genus: Gerrardina; Oliv.

Species
- Gerrardina eylesiana Gerrardina foliosa

= Gerrardina =

Genus of flowering plants

Gerrardina is a genus of two species of trees, shrubs, and scrambling shrubs found in southeastern Africa. Until recently, the genus was placed in the polyphyletic family Flacourtiaceae, but it was abnormal there due to its apical placentation, small embryos, and mucilaginous foliar epidermis. Analyses of DNA data indicated that the genus did not fit in any known plant family and not clearly in any then-recognized order, and a new family, Gerrardinaceae, was thus created for it. Later analyses of additional DNA data and data from wood anatomy indicated that the family should be placed in the order Huerteales.
