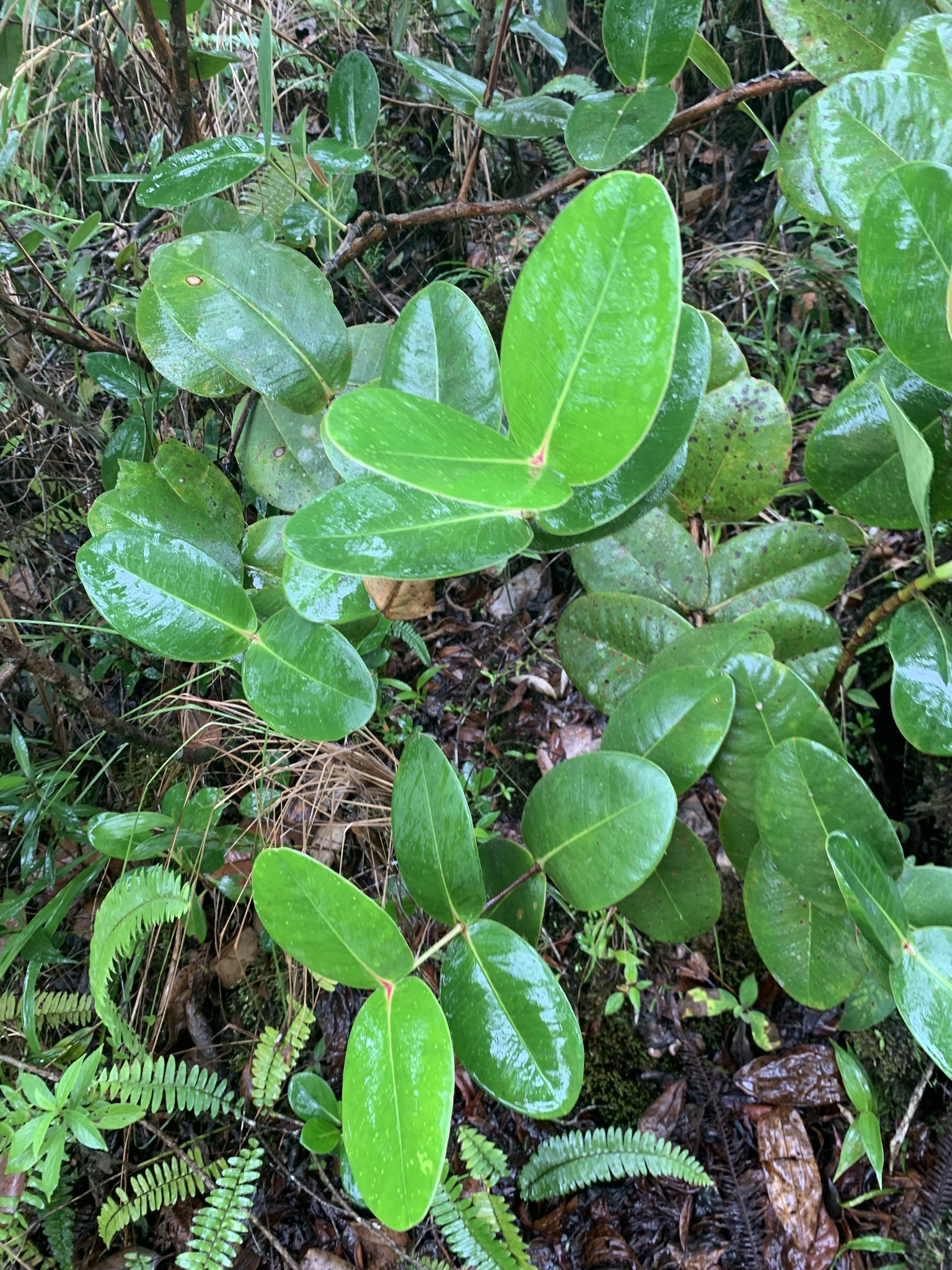

Conservation status
- Least Concern (IUCN 3.1)

Scientific classification
- Kingdom: Plantae
- Clade: Tracheophytes
- Clade: Angiosperms
- Clade: Eudicots
- Clade: Rosids
- Order: Myrtales
- Family: Alzateaceae; S.A.Graham
- Genus: Alzatea; Ruiz & Pav.
- Species: A. verticillata

Binomial name
- Alzatea verticillata Ruiz & Pav.

Subspecies
- Alzatea verticillata subsp. amplifolia S.A.Graham; Alzatea verticillata subsp. verticillata

Synonyms
- Alzatea mexicana F.Dietr., nom. illeg.

= Alzatea =

Genus of trees

Alzatea verticillata is a small flowering tree, native to the Neotropics. It inhabits moist submontane forests from Costa Rica and Panama in Central America south to Peru and Bolivia in tropical South America. It is the sole species of genus Alzatea and family Alzateaceae.

== Description ==
Alzatea verticillata has opposite, obovate or elliptical leaves. Its flowers are actinomorphic and bisexual, and lack a corolla. The flowers and fruit are similar to the Myrtaceae but the ovary is superior. The fruit is a loculicidal capsule.

The closest relatives of Alzatea are in the families Penaeaceae, Oliniaceae, Rhynchocalycaceae of southern Africa.
