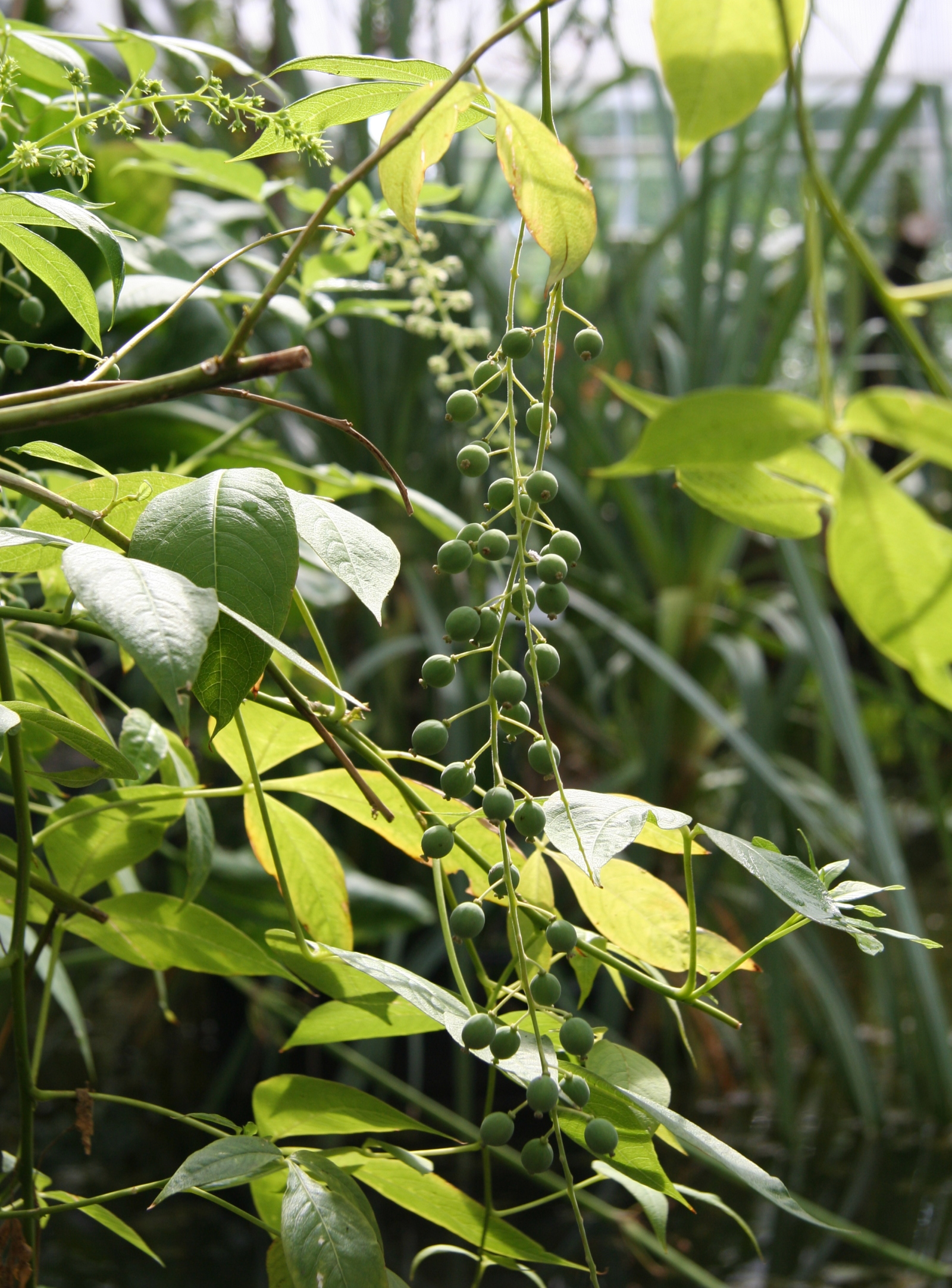
- Tovaria pendula

Scientific classification
- Kingdom: Plantae
- Clade: Tracheophytes
- Clade: Angiosperms
- Clade: Eudicots
- Clade: Rosids
- Order: Brassicales
- Family: Tovariaceae; Pax
- Genus: Tovaria; Ruiz & Pav.

Species
- Tovaria pendula Ruiz & Pav.; Tovaria diffusa Fawc. & Rendle

= Tovaria =

Species of plant

Tovaria is a genus of herbs native to Jamaica and South America. There are two species, Tovaria pendula and Tovaria diffusa. The genus is the only one in the family Tovariaceae.
