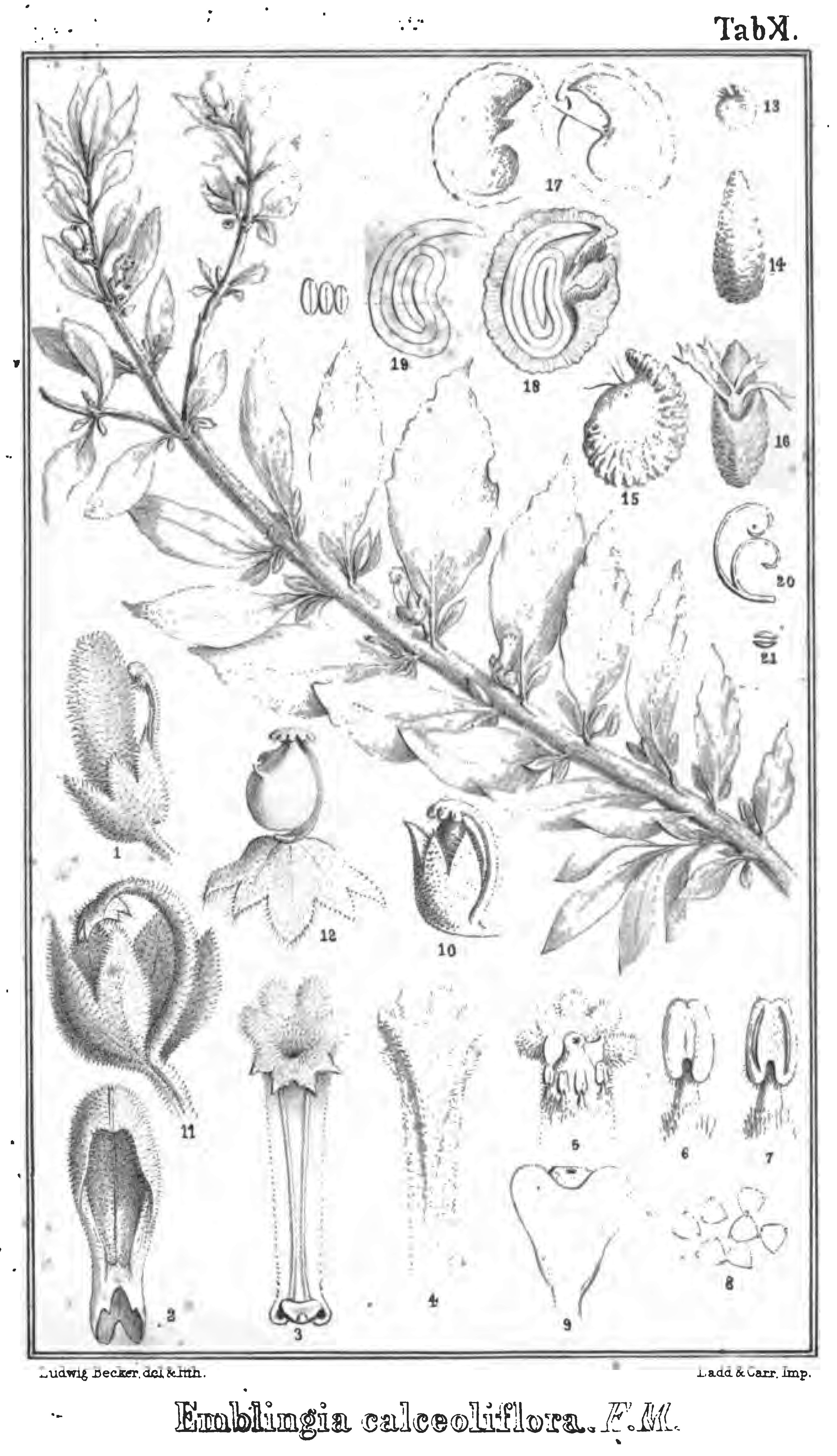

Scientific classification
- Kingdom: Plantae
- Clade: Tracheophytes
- Clade: Angiosperms
- Clade: Eudicots
- Clade: Rosids
- Order: Brassicales
- Family: Emblingiaceae (Pax) Airy Shaw
- Genus: Emblingia; F.Muell.
- Species: E. calceoliflora

Binomial name
- Emblingia calceoliflora F.Muell.

= Emblingia =

Genus of flowering plants

Emblingia is a monospecific plant genus containing the species Emblingia calceoliflora, a herbaceous prostrate subshrub endemic to Western Australia. It has no close relatives, and is now generally placed alone in family Emblingiaceae.

== Description ==
It is a perennial, herbaceous prostrate subshrub, with simple petiolate leaves with "cartilaginous" (hard and tough, resembling cartilage) margins. The irregular, solitary flowers are white, cream, yellow, green or, pink, and occur from August to November. It has a non-fleshy fruit.

== Taxonomy ==
The genus and species were first published in 1861 by Ferdinand von Mueller in Fragmenta Phytographiae Australiae, based on specimens collected in the Murchison region by Pemberton Walcott and Augustus Frederick Oldfield.

Placement of the genus within a family has previously been considered a difficult problem; it has at various times been placed in Capparaceae, Sapindaceae, Goodeniaceae and, in the Cronquist system, Polygalaceae. In 1965, Herbert Kenneth Airy Shaw erected Emblingiaceae for the genus, and that family is now used for the genus in the APG II, Dahlgren, Reveal, Stevens, Takhtajan and Thorne systems. Molecular analyses have confirmed the genus's placement in the Brassicales.

== Distribution and habitat ==
It is endemic to Western Australia, occurring in grey, yellow or red sand, on undulating sandplains of the west coast. It is most common in the Geraldton Sandplains and Carnarvon biogeographic regions, but also occurs on the north western edge of the Avon Wheatbelt.

== Ecology ==
It is not considered to be threatened.
