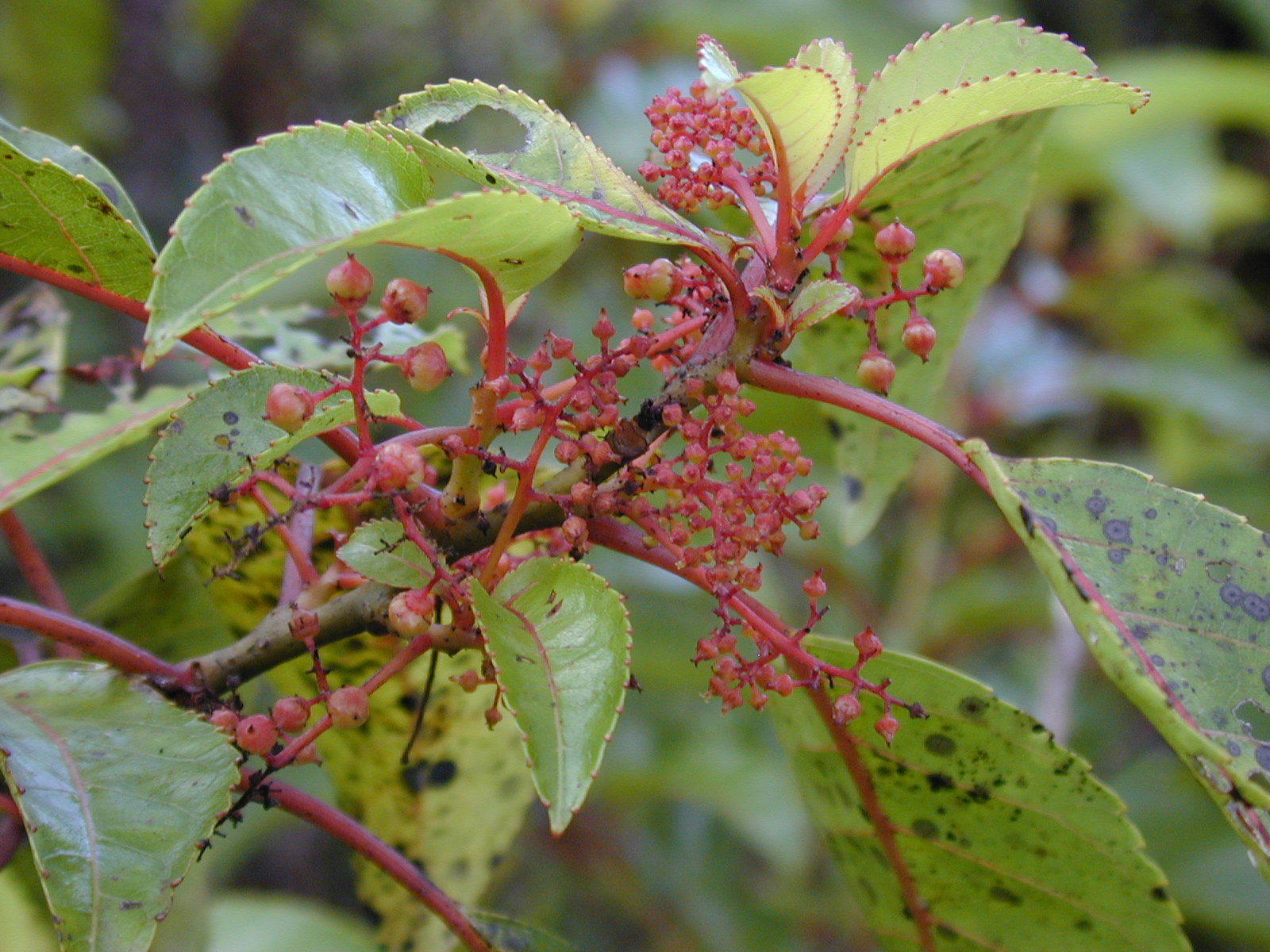
- Perrottetia sandwicensis

Scientific classification
- Kingdom: Plantae
- Clade: Tracheophytes
- Clade: Angiosperms
- Clade: Eudicots
- Clade: Rosids
- Order: Huerteales
- Family: Dipentodontaceae; Merr.

= Dipentodontaceae =

Family of flowering plants

Dipentodontaceae is a family of flowering plants containing two genera.

- Dipentodon Dunn - southern China, Assam, Myanmar
- Perrottetia Kunth - southern China, Southeast Asia, Papuasia, Queensland, Hawaii, Latin America
