= Dalrympelea calciphila =

Conservation status
- Endangered (IUCN 3.1)

Scientific classification
- Kingdom: Plantae
- Clade: Tracheophytes
- Clade: Angiosperms
- Clade: Eudicots
- Clade: Rosids
- Order: Crossosomatales
- Family: Staphyleaceae
- Genus: Dalrympelea
- Species: D. calciphila

Binomial name
- Dalrympelea calciphila (J.T.Pereira) Nor-Ezzaw.

Synonyms
- Turpinia calciphila J.T.Pereira

Species of flowering plant

Dalrympelea calciphila is a plant in the family Staphyleaceae. It is native to Borneo.

== Description ==
Dalrympelea calciphila grows as a tree up to 25 m (80 ft) tall with a trunk diameter of up to 50 cm (20 in). The bark is yellow and flaky. The leathery leaves are elliptic to ovate and measure up to 15 cm (6 in) long and up to 6.5 cm (2.6 in) wide. The inflorescences are in panicles.

== Taxonomy ==
Dalrympelea calciphila was first described as Turpinia calciphila in 1994 by the botanist Joan Pereira in the journal Sandakania. In 2010, botanist A. T. Nor-Ezzawanis transferred the species to the genus Dalrympelea. The type specimen was collected on Mount Api in Borneo. The specific epithet calciphila means 'lime-loving', referring to the species' limestone habitat.

== Distribution and habitat ==
Dalrympelea calciphila is endemic to Borneo, where it is confined to Sarawak. Its habitat is on limestone screes, to elevations of 900 m (3,000 ft).

== Conservation ==
Dalrympelea calciphila has been assessed as endangered on the IUCN Red List. It is threatened by mining activities in the hills of Bau District. The species' presence in Gunung Buda, Gunung Mulu and Dered Krian national parks affords a level of protection.
