= Dalrympelea borneensis =

Conservation status
- Vulnerable (IUCN 3.1)

Scientific classification
- Kingdom: Plantae
- Clade: Embryophytes
- Clade: Tracheophytes
- Clade: Spermatophytes
- Clade: Angiosperms
- Clade: Eudicots
- Clade: Rosids
- Order: Crossosomatales
- Family: Staphyleaceae
- Genus: Dalrympelea
- Species: D. borneensis

Binomial name
- Dalrympelea borneensis (Merr. & L.M.Perry) Nor-Ezzaw.

Synonyms
- Turpinia borneensis (Merr. & L.M.Perry) B.L.Linden; Turpinia montana var. borneensis Merr. & L.M.Perry

Species of flowering plant

Dalrympelea borneensis is a plant in the family Staphyleaceae. It is native to Borneo and the Philippines.

== Description ==
Dalrympelea borneensis grows as a tree up to 20 m (70 ft) tall with a trunk diameter of up to 20 cm (8 in). The brown bark is fissured. The papery leaves are lanceolate to elliptic or ovate and measure up to 18 cm (7 in) long and up to 7 cm (3 in) wide. The inflorescences, in panicles, feature yellow or cream flowers. The round fruits have up to four brown seeds.

== Taxonomy ==
Dalrympelea borneensis was first described as Turpinia montana var. borneensis in 1941 by Elmer Drew Merrill and Lily May Perry in the Journal of the Arnold Arboretum. In 1960, B. L. van der Linden named it Turpinia borneensis. In 2010, botanist A. T. Nor-Ezzawanis transferred the species to the genus Dalrympelea. The type specimen was collected in Tenompok, Borneo. The specific epithet borneensis means 'of Borneo'.

== Distribution and habitat ==
Dalrympelea borneensis is native to Borneo and the Philippines. Its habitat is primary and secondary dipterocarp forests, to elevations of about 1,800 m (6,000 ft).
