= Dalrympelea sphaerocarpa =

Conservation status
- Least Concern (IUCN 3.1)

Scientific classification
- Kingdom: Plantae
- Clade: Tracheophytes
- Clade: Angiosperms
- Clade: Eudicots
- Clade: Rosids
- Order: Crossosomatales
- Family: Staphyleaceae
- Genus: Dalrympelea
- Species: D. sphaerocarpa

Binomial name
- Dalrympelea sphaerocarpa (Hassk.) Nor-Ezzaw.

Synonyms
- Maurocenia sphaerocarpa Hassk. (1891); Dalrympelea javanica Hassk. (1848); Turpinia pomifera var. sphaerocarpa Hassk. (1895); Turpinia sphaerocarpa Hassk. (1842)

Species of flowering plant

Dalrympelea sphaerocarpa is a species of plant in the genus Dalrympelea. It is native to Borneo, Java, Sunda Islands, Maluku, Philippines, Sulawesi, Sumatera and Thailand. Dalrympelea sphaerocarpa was first known as Turpinia sphaerocarpa in 1842, described by Justus Carl Hasskarl.

== Description ==
Dalrympelea sphaerocarpa is a kind of tree. Its fruits are around 1.3 cm (0.51 in) in length. Dalrympelea sphaerocarpa has 1 to 6 seeds per fruit. It has one accepted infraspecific variety Dalrympelea sphaerocarpa var. microcerotis that is found in Borneo.

== Distribution and habitat ==
Dalrympelea sphaerocarpa primarily lives in wet tropical biomes throughout Southern Thailand, Malaysia, Indonesia and the Philippines.
