= Dalrympelea nitida =

Conservation status
- Least Concern (IUCN 3.1)

Scientific classification
- Kingdom: Plantae
- Clade: Tracheophytes
- Clade: Angiosperms
- Clade: Eudicots
- Clade: Rosids
- Order: Crossosomatales
- Family: Staphyleaceae
- Genus: Dalrympelea
- Species: D. nitida

Binomial name
- Dalrympelea nitida (Merr. & L.M.Perry) Nor-Ezzaw.

Synonyms
- Turpinia nitida Merr. & L.M.Perry

Species of flowering plant

Dalrympelea nitida is a plant in the family Staphyleaceae. It is native to Borneo.

== Description ==
Dalrympelea nitida grows as a tree up to 15 m (50 ft) tall with a trunk diameter of up to 40 cm (16 in). The bark has lenticels or is fissured. The leathery leaves are variously shaped and measure up to 21 cm (8 in) long and up to 11 cm (4 in) wide. The inflorescences are in panicles.

== Taxonomy ==
Dalrympelea nitida was first described as Turpinia nitida in 1941 by botanists Elmer Drew Merrill and Lily May Perry in the Journal of the Arnold Arboretum. In 2010, botanist A. T. Nor-Ezzawanis transferred the species to the genus Dalrympelea. The type specimen was collected in 1933 on Mount Kinabalu in Borneo. The specific epithet nitida means 'shiny', referring to the leaves.

== Distribution and habitat ==
Dalrympelea nitida is endemic to Borneo, where it is confined to Sabah. Its habitat is primary and secondary forests, in hilly terrain, at elevations of about 200–1,500 m (700–4,900 ft).

== Conservation ==
Dalrympelea nitida has been assessed as least concern on the IUCN Red List. The species is abundant and is not considered threatened. It is present in three protected areas.
