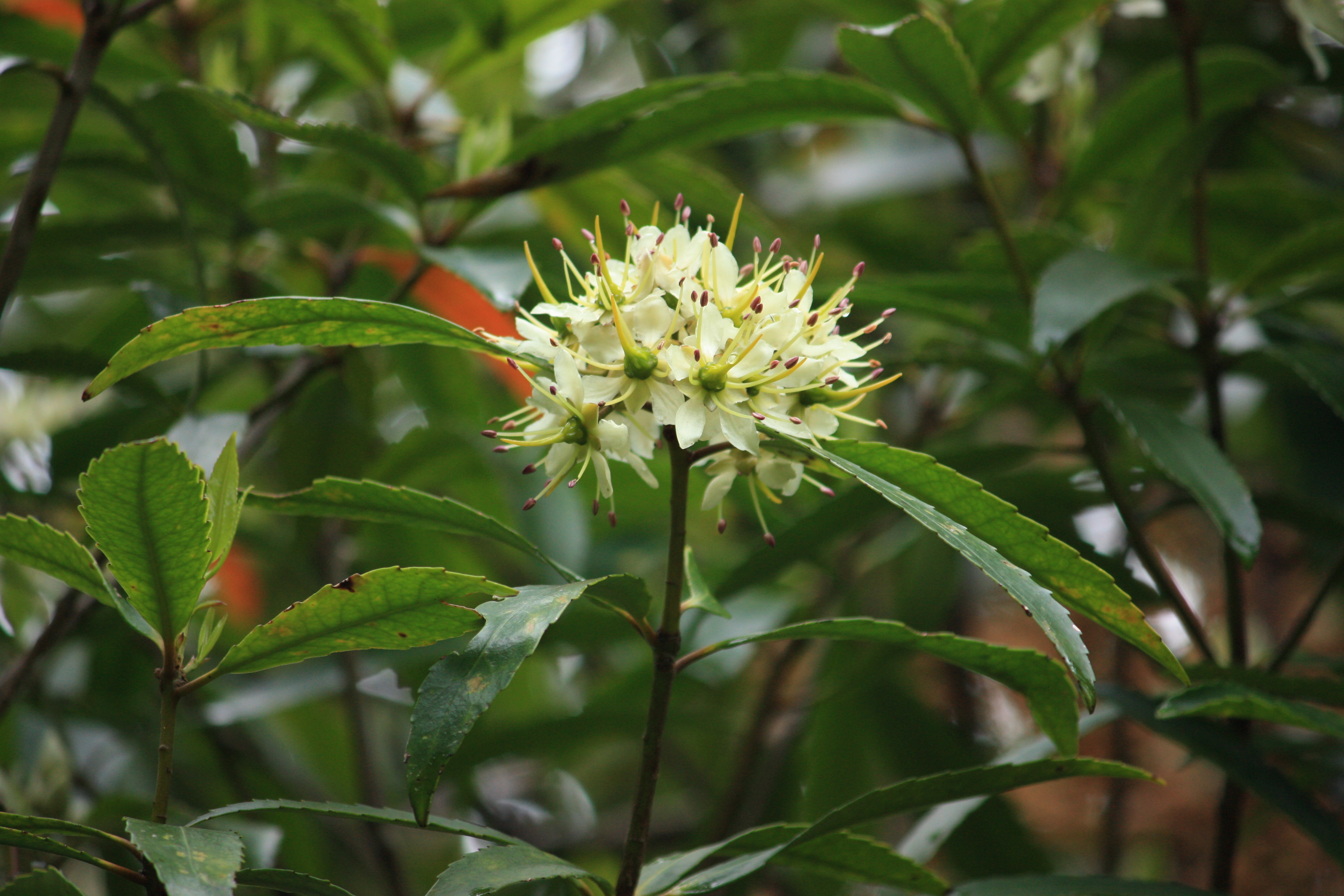
- Ixerba brexioides

Scientific classification
- Kingdom: Plantae
- Clade: Tracheophytes
- Clade: Angiosperms
- Clade: Eudicots
- Clade: Rosids
- Order: Crossosomatales
- Family: Strasburgeriaceae; Tiegh. in Soler.

Genera
- Strasburgeria; Ixerba

Synonyms
- Ixerbaceae

= Strasburgeriaceae =

Family of flowering plants

Strasburgeriaceae is a small family of flowering plants in the order Crossosomatales, only found in New Zealand and New Caledonia. It contains two genera, Strasburgeria and Ixerba. Both genera have simple, evergreen, alternated leaves, often in whorl-like clusters, with gland-tipped serrations, hermaphroditic, pentamerous flowers with persistent sepals, clawed petals, flat and long filaments that extend beyond the petals and a persistent style with a punctiform stigma.

Fossil pollen named Bluffopollis scabratus, found in deposits from the Paleocene to the Miocene, is almost identical to the pollen of Strasburgeria, although only half its size. The fact that it was found in western and southern Australia and in New Zealand suggests that the most recent common ancestor of Strasburgeria and Ixerba had developed by the time of the break-up of East-Gondwana.

Recent phylogenetic analysis resulted in the inclusion of the genus Ixerba (previously assigned to the monotypic family Ixerbaceae) in the Strasburgeriaceae. The following tree represents the most recent insights in the relationship between the Strasburgeriaceae and other families.

- Crossosomatales
  - - - family Strasburgeriaceae
        - Ixerba
        - Strasburgeria
      - Geissolomataceae
    - Aphloiaceae
  - - Staphyleaceae
    - - Guamatelaceae
      - - Stachyuraceae
        - Crossosomataceae

While both Ixerba brexioides and Strasburgeria robusta share a base chromosome number of x = 25, I. brexioides is diploid (2n = 2x = 50), while S. robusta is icosaploid (2n = 20x = 500). The massive polyploidy in S. robusta may have furthered the adaptations that let it survive on the ultramafic substrates found in the montane forest of New Caledonia.

== Species ==
- Ixerba brexioides
- Strasburgeria robusta

== External sources ==
- Strasburgeriaceae L. Watson and M.J. Dallwitz (1992 onwards). The families of flowering plants
- Ixerbaceae L. Watson and M.J. Dallwitz (1992 onwards). The families of flowering plants
- Photos of the pollen fossil Bluffopollis scabratus
