= Dalrympelea stipulacea =

Conservation status
- Vulnerable (IUCN 3.1)

Scientific classification
- Kingdom: Plantae
- Clade: Tracheophytes
- Clade: Angiosperms
- Clade: Eudicots
- Clade: Rosids
- Order: Crossosomatales
- Family: Staphyleaceae
- Genus: Dalrympelea
- Species: D. stipulacea

Binomial name
- Dalrympelea stipulacea (B.L.Linden) Nor-Ezzaw.

Synonyms
- Turpinia stipulacea B.L.Linden

Species of tree

Dalrympelea stipulacea is a species of plant in the family Staphyleaceae. It is a tree endemic to Borneo where it is confined to Mount Kinabalu in Sabah, Malaysia.

Dalrympelea stipulacea is a small tree, growing up to 10 metres tall.

It grows in montane rain forest from 1,800 to 2,400 metres elevation.
