= Dalrympelea grandis =

Conservation status
- Vulnerable (IUCN 3.1)

Scientific classification
- Kingdom: Plantae
- Clade: Embryophytes
- Clade: Tracheophytes
- Clade: Spermatophytes
- Clade: Angiosperms
- Clade: Eudicots
- Clade: Rosids
- Order: Crossosomatales
- Family: Staphyleaceae
- Genus: Dalrympelea
- Species: D. grandis

Binomial name
- Dalrympelea grandis (B.L.Linden) Nor-Ezzaw.

Synonyms
- Turpinia grandis B.L.Linden

Species of flowering plant

Dalrympelea grandis is a plant in the family Staphyleaceae. It is native to Borneo.

== Description ==
Dalrympelea grandis grows as a tree up to 20 m (70 ft) tall with a trunk diameter of up to 30 cm (12 in). The greyish bark is smooth. The leathery leaves are oblong to ovate and measure up to 25 cm (10 in) long and up to 13 cm (5 in) wide. The inflorescences, in panicles, feature yellow flowers. The roundish fruits measure up to 2 cm (0.8 in) long.

== Taxonomy ==
Dalrympelea grandis was first described as Turpinia grandis in 1960 by B. L. van der Linden in Flora Malesiana. In 2010, botanist A. T. Nor-Ezzawanis transferred the species to the genus Dalrympelea. The type specimen was collected near the Kiau River in Borneo. The specific epithet grandis means 'large', referring to the leaves.

== Distribution and habitat ==
Dalrympelea grandis is endemic to Borneo. Its habitat is on hills or by rivers.
