= Native hydrangea =

Native hydrangea is a common name for several Australian plants and may refer to:

- Abrophyllum ornans
- Cuttsia viburnea, endemic to eastern Australia
