= Huertea cubensis =

Conservation status
- Vulnerable (IUCN 3.1)

Scientific classification
- Kingdom: Plantae
- Clade: Tracheophytes
- Clade: Angiosperms
- Clade: Eudicots
- Clade: Rosids
- Order: Huerteales
- Family: Tapisciaceae
- Genus: Huertea
- Species: H. cubensis

Binomial name
- Huertea cubensis Griseb.

Species of flowering plant

Huertea cubensis is a species of plant in the family Tapisciaceae. It is found in Cuba, the Dominican Republic, and Haiti.
