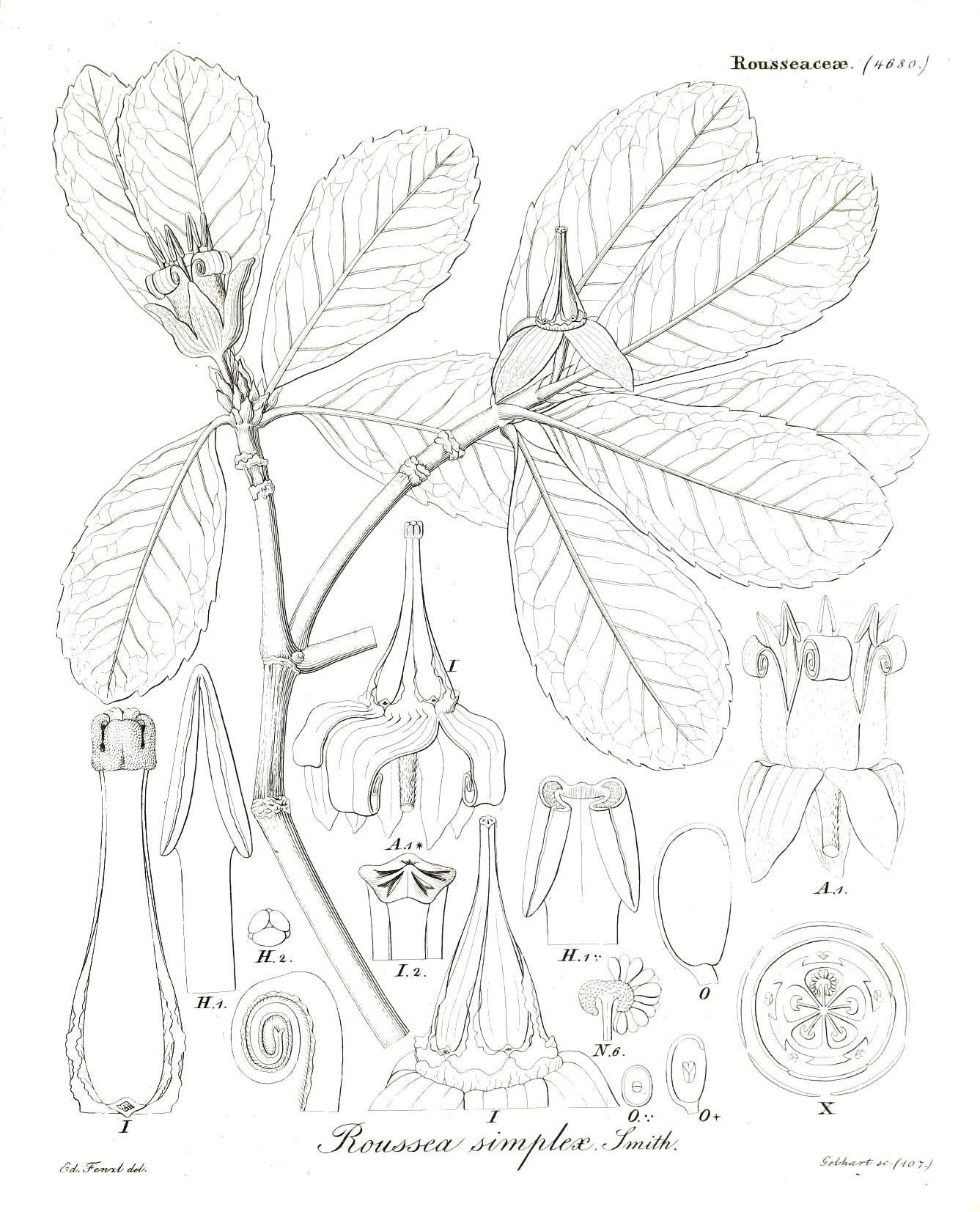
- Drawing from Iconographia generum plantarum, F. Beck, 1838

Scientific classification
- Kingdom: Plantae
- Clade: Tracheophytes
- Clade: Angiosperms
- Clade: Eudicots
- Clade: Asterids
- Order: Asterales
- Family: Rousseaceae
- Subfamily: Rousseoideae; Horan.
- Genus: Roussea; Sm.
- Species: R. simplex

Binomial name
- Roussea simplex Sm.

= Roussea =

Genus of plants

Roussea simplex is a woody climber of 4–6 m high, that is endemic to the mountain forest of Mauritius. It is the only species of the genus Roussea, which is assigned to the family Rousseaceae. It has opposing, entire, obovate, green leaves, with modest teeth towards the tip and mostly pentamerous, drooping flowers with yellowish recurved tepals, and a purse-shaped orange corolla with strongly recurved narrowly triangular lobes.

== Description ==
=== Stems and leaves ===
Roussea simplex is a 4–6 m tall liana. The wood vessels have very oblique oval openings which are subdivided by about 20 (maximally 50) bars (this is called scalariform), while the side walls have pits in rows and lack spiral-shaped thickenings. Its young stems are firm and have thick nodes. Leaves are set opposite to each other, but several pairs can be close to each other creating a whorl-like cluster. Stipules at the base of the leaf stems are absent, while the leaf stems themselves are about 1 cm long and are covered with felty hairs. The leaf blades are robust, large, and have a long inverted egg-shape (7–12 × 3–5½ cm). The base is rounded to slightly wedged, the margin is slightly serrated, particularly towards the tip and the tip is pointed or blunt. The top of the leaf blade is darker green and without hair, the underside is lighter and has some hair. The light green main vein splits pinnately and the secondary veins end at the leaf margin. The leaves contain long resin channels. Glandular peltate hairs are said to be present.

=== Flowers ===
In the axis of the leaf mostly single (but occasionally up to four) pendulous flowers arise on a flowerstem of about 2 cm long that is covered in felty hairs. These flowers are mostly pentamerous (but sometimes 4-merous), large and robust, measuring approximately 2½ cm. The flowers have a slightly sweet scent reminiscent of yeast, a possible adaptation to the preference of the gecko pollinator. The anthers are ripe before the stigmas, meaning that individual flowers are first male and subsequently female (or protandrous). The sepals are leathery, persistent, initially spreading and whitish during the male phase, to become more yellowish and deflexed during the female phase, and eventually more or less spreading again and pale green during development of the fruit. The corolla is bell- or purse-shaped, strongly deflexed in the upper half, with individual petals thick, long egg-shaped to narrowly triangular, yolk yellow near the base and gradually becoming a warm orange near the tip, with felty hairs on the outside, more dense toward the tip. The stamens alternate with the petals, are yolk yellow, large, completely covering the ovary and pistil, with filaments triangular and leaning towards the middle, with large anthers facing outwards, away from the stigma. The pollen grains are circular, 25–30 μm in diameter, secreted in a wet, sticky, yellowish fluid, which easily attaches to smooth surfaces. After three to four days the stamens drop from the flower and so reveal the pale female parts, which have a large central style and a bud-shaped stigma, that is greenish in the male phase and turns yellow in the female phase. The fruit is a pale green berry shaped like an angular flat onion. It contains many minute, flat and ovoid seeds. Nectar is released in generous quantities during both male and female phases.

== Taxonomy ==
=== Taxonomic history ===
Roussea simplex was described in 1789 by James Edward Smith, who placed it in the Campanulaceae. In 1830, Alphonse Pyramus de Candolle however rejected this assignment and considered ties with the Escalloniaceae, Loganaceae or Goodeniaceae. His father, Augustin Pyramus de Candolle, eventually erected a then monotypic family Rousseaceae in 1839. John Lindley saw close relationships with Argophyllum, Ixerba and Brexia and included Roussea in the Brexiaceae in 1853. Most later authors agreed with Lindley, but differed about the rank of this grouping, considering an order, family, subfamily (within the Saxifragaceae or the Escalloniaceae) or tribe (in the Escallonioideae in the Saxifragaceae). Other authors remained doubtful about the connection with Brexia, as suggested by differences in pollen, anatomy and chemistry. Since the development of methods to compare DNA to determine relationships between organisms (phylogenetics), the affinities of Roussea to the Asterales have been affirmed repeatedly.

=== Modern classification ===
Phylogenetic analysis puts a clade consisting of Abrophyllum, Cuttsia and Carpodetus in the subfamily Carpodetoideae as sister to Roussea, on its own representing the Rousseoideae. Together these two make up the family Rousseaceae.

=== Phylogeny ===
The following tree represents the current insights in the relationships of Roussea with other taxa.

- - family Campanulaceae
  - - subfamily Rousseoideae
      Roussea
    - subfamily Carpodetoideae
      - - Abrophyllum
        - Cuttsia
      - Carpodetus

=== Reassigned species ===
One species that was described as Roussea has been reassigned to another family later on.

- R. salicifolia = Pouteria salicifolia (Sapotaceae).

=== Etymology ===
Roussea was named after Jean-Jacques Rousseau. The species epithet simplex is derived from Latin and means simple or characterized by one element.

== Distribution and habitat ==
Roussea simplex is an endemic climbing shrub of Mauritius, currently known to be confined in nine locations around the south-east, centre and south-west regions of the island. This climbing shrub mainly grows in wet, high elevation cloud forests, such as at Le Pouce, Mauritius' third highest mountain .

== Ecology ==
The flowers of Roussea produce copious amounts of nectar and are pollinated by the blue-tailed day gecko Phelsuma cepediana. The fruit secretes a gelatinous substance that contains the minute seeds. The blue-tailed gecko licks up this secretion and disperses the seeds in its droppings. More recently, the Mauritius bulbul, Hypsipetes olivaceus was revealed as a more efficient pollinator of Roussea given its long beak and ability to fly longer distances.

=== Pests and diseases ===
Technomyrmex albipes, a small ant introduced to Mauritius that came originally from the Indo-Pacific area, seals the flowers of Roussea with clay to protect mealy bugs. These drink the sap and excrete a sugary urine that is collected by the ants. The ants attack animals that visit the plant, and so prevent the blue-tailed day gecko from pollinating the flowers and from eating the fruit, and in this way seriously hampering the reproduction of Roussea. Two new species were reported to visit flowers for nectar, the native Plagiolepis madecassa and the invasive yellow crazy ant, Anoplolepis gracilipes. However, it has also been reported that the infestation by alien ants varies seasonally and occurs mostly on plants that have collapsed closer to the ground, due to competition by surrounding alien invasive plants, such as strawberry guava.

== Conservation ==
In 1937 Roussea was common on Mauritius, but it is now considered critically endangered. Some 250 plants in nine localities are reported to survive, but the population is in rapid decline having lost 50% of individuals within a decade. The species is relatively little affected by deforestation because it grows mainly along mountain ridges or crater rims or in other rocky areas which have been largely spared by the extensive deforestation that occurred in Mauritius and the most important driver of its decline is competitive displacement by invasive alien plants, mainly the Strawberry guava and to a lesser extent introduced invasive rats that eat flowers and flower buds and introduced invasive macaques that break its branches, and destroy its flower buds, flowers and unripe fruits as well as predate on its main endemic pollinator, the Mauritius Bulbul. Seeds germinate well within three weeks when sowed on tree fern stems in its native habitat but fail to germinate on the ground or on other plants, and both germination rate and early seedling survival were higher if invasive alien plants are removed from their vicinity.
