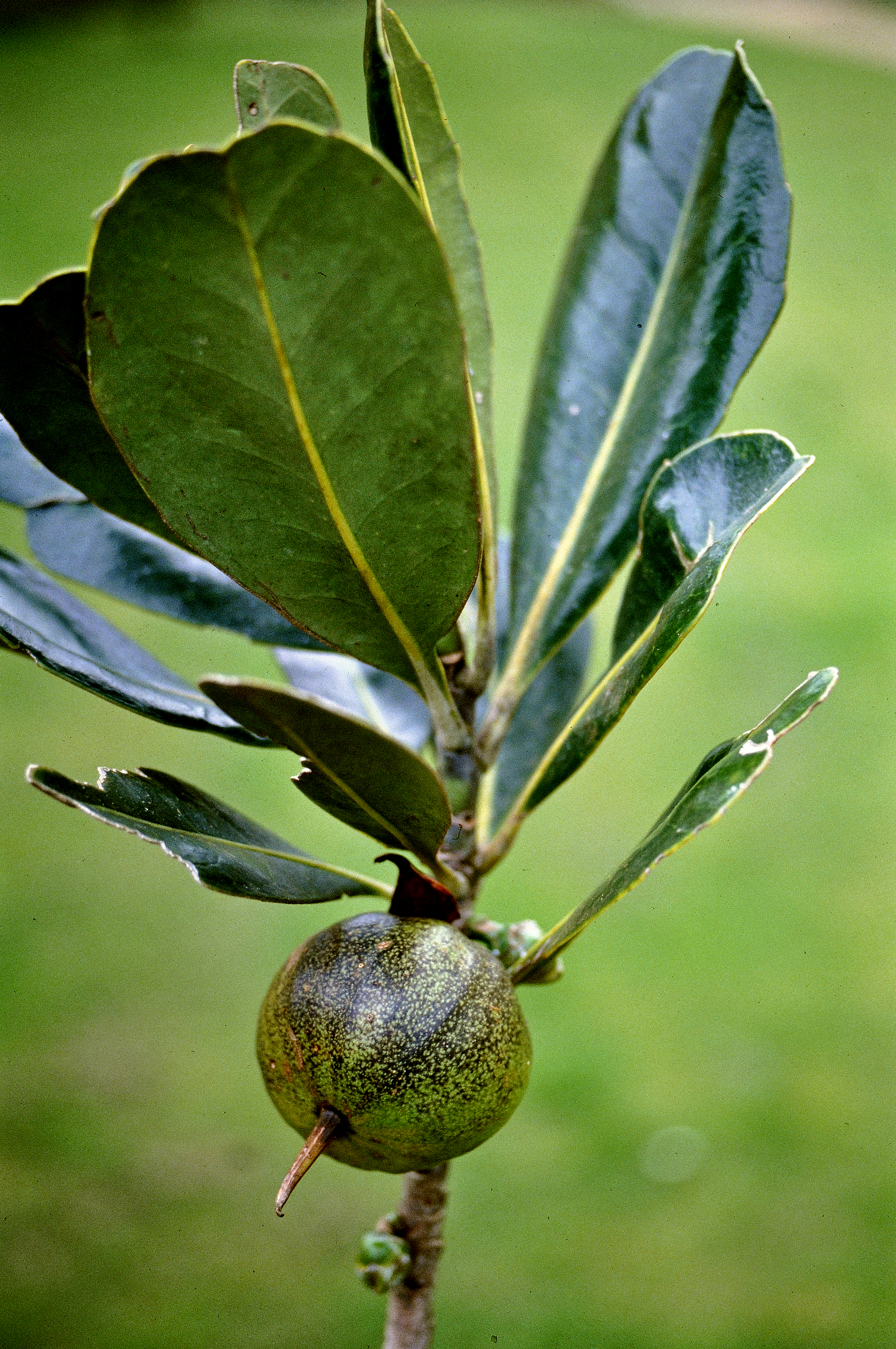
- Strasburgeria robusta fruiting, collected in New Caledonia by Loki Schmidt in 1991 and sent to Wilhelm Barthlott, Botanical Garden University of Bonn

Scientific classification
- Kingdom: Plantae
- Clade: Tracheophytes
- Clade: Angiosperms
- Clade: Eudicots
- Clade: Rosids
- Order: Crossosomatales
- Family: Strasburgeriaceae
- Genus: Strasburgeria; Baill.
- Species: S. robusta

Binomial name
- Strasburgeria robusta (Vieill. ex Panch. & Sebert) Guillaumin

Synonyms
- Montrouziera robusta, Strasburgeria calliantha

= Strasburgeria =

Genus of trees

Strasburgeria robusta is an evergreen tree with large toothed leaves and large but rather inconspicuous, single, pendulant flowers in a gloomy color scheme of yellowish with brown markings, with about ten sepals, five petals, ten stamens, a very distinct circular nectar gland with radiating spikes and rather large globular fruits with a long persistent style, with a scent reminiscent of apples, which is endemic to New Caledonia. It is the only recognized species of the genus Strasburgeria.

== Description ==
Strasburgeria robusta is an icosaploid with five hundred chromosomes, in twenty sets of twenty five (20n = 500). This massive polyploidy in S. robusta may have enabled the adaptations that let it survive on the ultramafic substrates found in the montane forest of New Caledonia.

=== Stems and leaves ===
The wood of Strasburgeria does not have growth rings. Wood vessels are mostly isolated but sometimes occur in pairs or with three together. The ending of the vessel is very oblique (almost vertical), with twenty to thirty five bars (a state called scalariform). The leaves are simple, hairless, have a short leaf stem, a long inverted egg-shape, and are arranged alternately around the stem. Stipules grow between the base of the leaf stem and the stem, a rather rare character. Leaf stems have narrow wings on each side, which is a continuation of the leaf blades. Blades are about 12 cm long and 4–5 cm wide, leathery with a rounded tip, have a foot that gradually narrows into the wings of the leaf stem, and have widely spaced teeth along the margins, particularly in the distal half. These teeth are clear to see in leaves on young shoots but become very subtle on leaves on older growth. The tip of the teeth is opaque. The stomata are restricted to the underside (or abaxial surface), and are of the anomocytic type.

=== Flowers ===
The large (5–5½ × 2–2½ cm), more or less pendulant, star-symmetrical, hermaphrodite flowers stand individually in the axil of the leaves on a short flower stem. The calyx consists of eight to ten, free, concave, and spirally arranged sepals which gradually increase in size from outer to inner, overlap in the bud, and do not fall after flowering. These sepals are approximately oval in shape, leathery in consistency and are covered in simple one-celled straight or slightly curved hairs of 0.2–0.6 mm. Sepals and petals both contain crystals of various shapes and mucilaginous cells. The five (or sometimes six) free petals are oval, much larger than the sepals, also overlap in the bud, but fall off after flowering, with a range in form that includes inverted egg-shaped. The petals are thick, cream to yellow in color, sometimes with a purple blush, and with an irregular pattern of brown or red veins. The ten free filaments are the same color as the petals, thick, gradually tapering upwards, 4–5¼ cm long, ½ cm broad, and carry facing the style an anther that is connected at midlength with the filament. The dark brownish anthers open with slits to the sides to release the cream-colored pollen. Pollen is triangular with very short slits at each of the corners and lacks further adornment. The outer margin of the disc is a very distinct narrow circular ridge-shaped nectar gland with ten side-ridges radiating out. The four to seven carpels are fused and carry a single, long, straight style which is topped by a lobed stigma. The style is not shed after flowering.

=== Fruit and seed ===
The fruit is a green globule of 7–7½ cm in diameter and 6–6½ cm high, with a woody consistence that does not open, and when it has disintegrated a skeleton of woody fibers remains. One seed may develop in each carpel. The seeds do not have wings, are not covered by an aril and are somewhat flattened, 10×8×3 mm. The ripe fruit smells of apples.

== Taxonomy ==
=== Taxonomic history ===
The species was initially described by Eugène Vieillard as Montrouziera robusta in 1874 in a book by Pancher and Sebert. Montrouziera however is a genus that belongs to the Guttiferae family. Henri Ernest Baillon in 1876 gave the same species another name: Strasburgeria calliantha. André Guillaumin realized both species were the same and should not be assigned to Montrouziera, so following the principle of priority according to the International Code of Nomenclature for algae, fungi, and plants he made the correct combination S. robusta in 1942. Dickison, who made a thorough redescription of the species, agrees with most earlier authors that Strasburgeria would probably be an early branch of the Theales, with many characters in common with the Ochnaceae, but also noted important differences such as a much more primitive anatomy of the wood and much further developed morphology of the pollen.

=== Modern classification ===
Recent genetic analysis revealed that Ixerba, an endemic of New Zealand, is closely related to Strasburgeria and it was assigned to the Strasburgeriaceae by the APG III in 2009.

=== Phylogeny ===
Fossil pollen named Bluffopollis scabratus, found in deposits from the Paleocene to the Miocene, is almost identical to the pollen of Strasburgeria, although only half its size. The fact that it was found in western and southern Australia and in New Zealand suggests that the most recent common ancestor of Strasburgeria and Ixerba had developed by the time of the break-up of East-Gondwana.

Recent phylogenetic analysis suggest that the Geissolomataceae are the closest relatives of the Strasburgeriaceae and this results in the following tree.

- - family Strasburgeriaceae
    - Ixerba
    - Strasburgeria
  - Geissolomataceae

=== Etymology ===
Strasburgeria has been named in honor of Eduard Strasburger (1844-1912), a German botanist.

== Distribution ==
This species only occurs in the rainforest of the South of New Caledonia's main island Grande Terre.

== Ecology ==
Strasburgeria flowers have been observed to only be visited by birds, such as the honeyeater Guadalcanaria undulata.

== External sources ==
- Photo series, showing leaves, flowers and fruit
- Photos of the pollen fossil Bluffopollis scabratus
