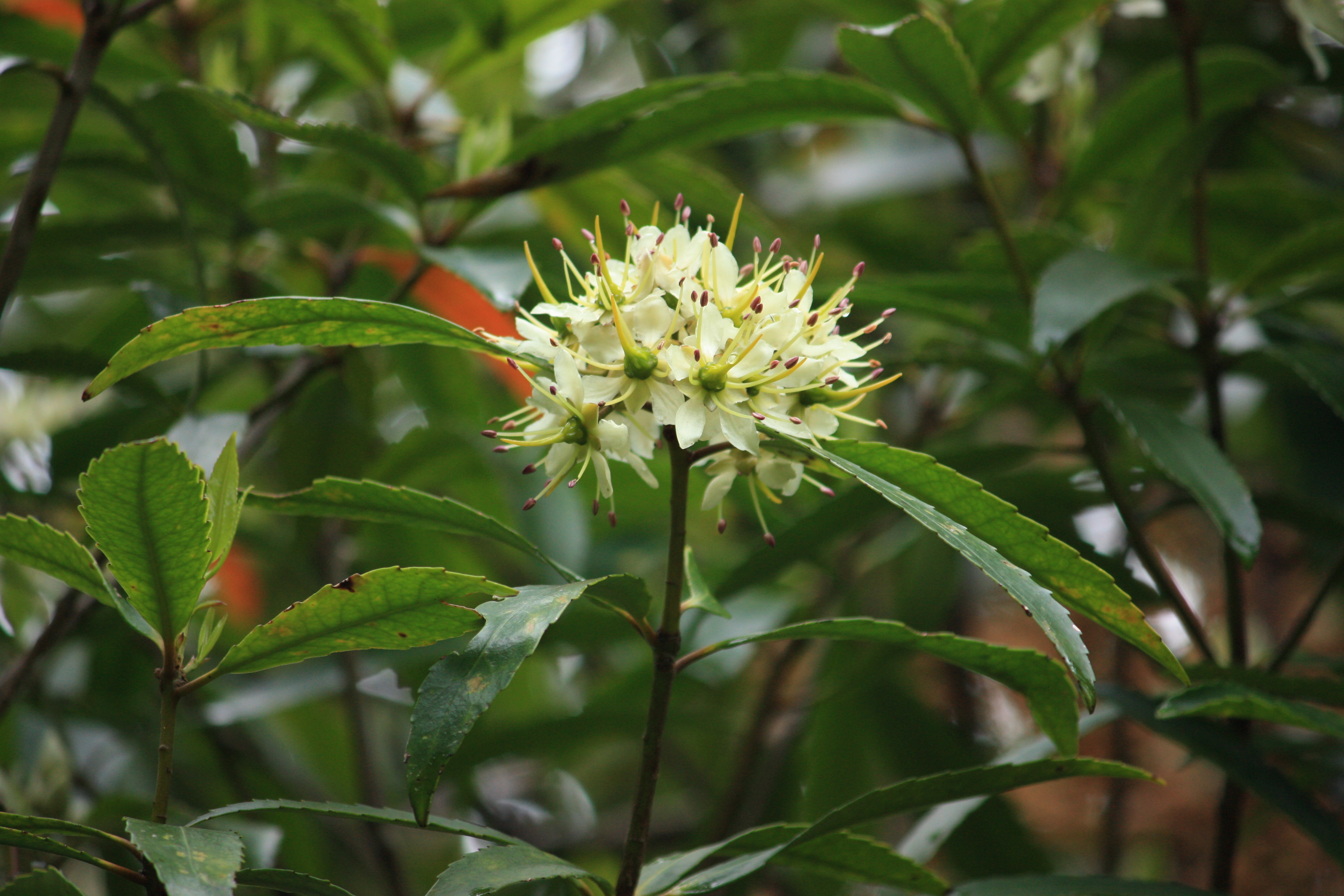
- Tawari, Bay of Plenty
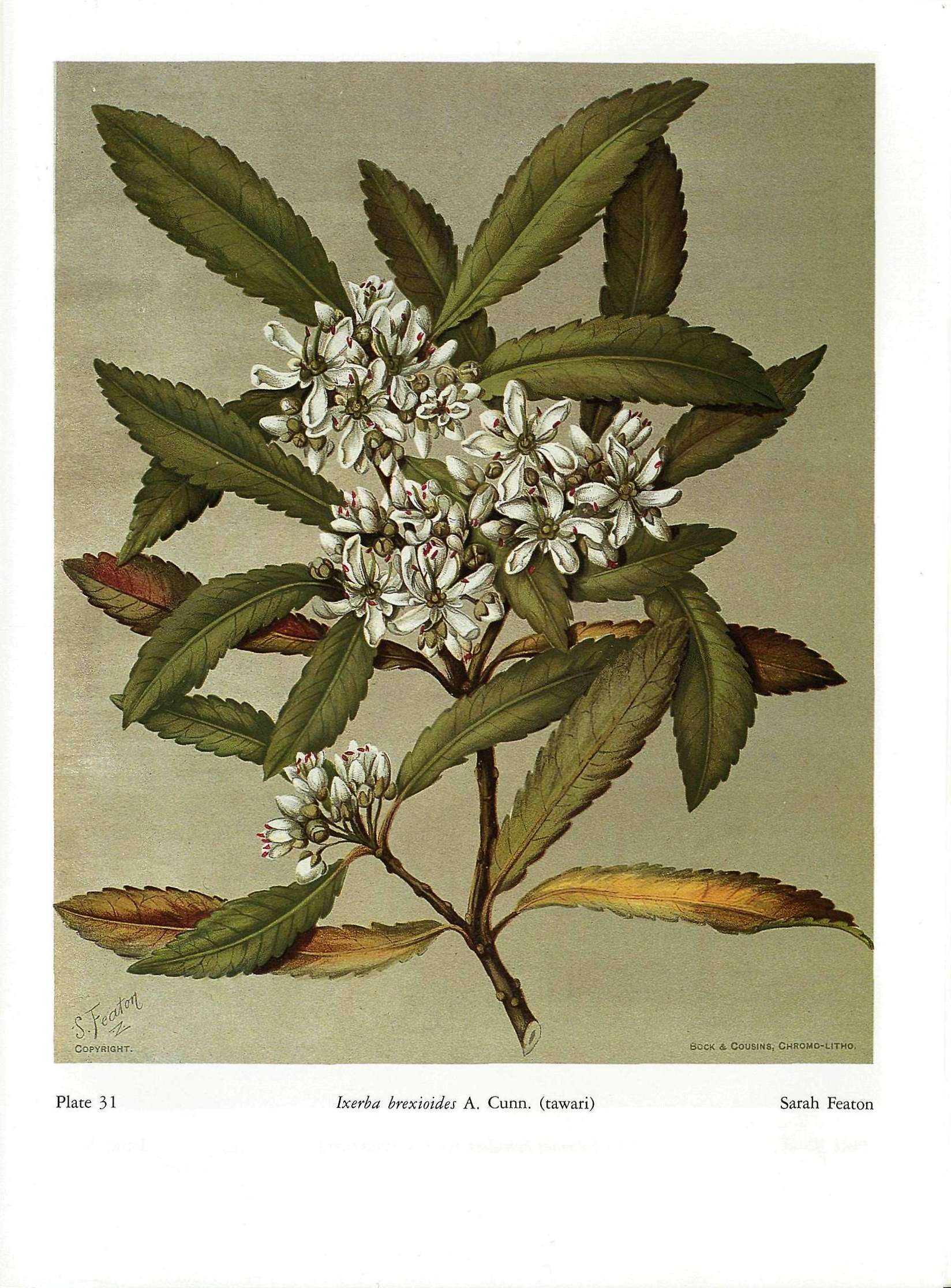

Conservation status
- Least Concern (IUCN 3.1)

Scientific classification
- Kingdom: Plantae
- Clade: Embryophytes
- Clade: Tracheophytes
- Clade: Spermatophytes
- Clade: Angiosperms
- Clade: Eudicots
- Clade: Rosids
- Order: Crossosomatales
- Family: Strasburgeriaceae
- Genus: Ixerba; A.Cunn.
- Species: I. brexioides

Binomial name
- Ixerba brexioides A.Cunn.

= Ixerba =

Genus of trees

Ixerba brexioides, the sole species in the genus Ixerba, is a bushy tree with thick, narrow, serrated, dark green leaves and panicles of white flowers with a green heart. The fruit is a green capsule that splits open to reveal the black seeds partly covered with a fleshy scarlet aril against the white inside of the fruit. Ixerba is endemic to the northern half of the North Island of New Zealand. Common names used in New Zealand are tawari (or tāwari) for the tree and whakou when in flower. It is assigned to the family Strasburgeriaceae.

== Description ==
=== Stem and leaves ===
Tawari is a small tree of up to 10 m high with a spreading crown. The trunk is usually between 2–4 dm in diameter, and covered by a thick grayish brown bark that acts as a buffer. Young branches have few flat-lying pale unicellular T-hairs, while the peduncles, pedicels, sepals and petals are thickly covered in such hairs, giving them a felty look. The leaves are alternately positioned along the stem and often almost create a whorl at the end of a growth period, with the bud at the end covered in stout triangular scales. These scales have entire margins fringed with simple single celled hairs. The first leaves to appear when growth recommences are an intermediate series between schales and full leaves. Stipules at the base of the leaf stem are absent. The leaf stalk is stout, fleshy and about 2 cm long. The somewhat fleshy and distinctly leathery simple leaf blades are yellowish to dark green on top and pale green beneath and measure 6-16 × 1–4 cm, are lanceolate to elliptic in shape, while the widest point may be at or beyond midlength, with a pointy tip, and the edges are coarsely serrated. A small gland is present at the tip of each tooth. Young leaves are often reddish and have rolled-in margins. Leaves on young shoots may be relatively narrower. Old leaves discolor to orange or red.

=== Flowers ===
Flower buds are formed in March and April and these open from October to the end of December varying according to location and altitude. The inflorescence sits at the end of the branches in an umbel-like panicle that consists of five to fifteen flowers. Each flower is hermaphrodite, starsymmetric, 2 1/2—3 1/2 cm in diameter and produces copious amounts of nectar, but apparently does not emit a scent. The five sepals are broadly oval, covered in downy hairs and 5–6 mm long. The five petals are overlapping in the bud, white, felty, spoon-shaped with a narrow base (or claw). The claw is 1 1/2-2 cm long and is inserted on a 5-lobed disc. The five stamens extend well beyond the corolla and alternate with the five lobes of the disc at the centre of the flower. The filaments are very long and white. The anthers are connected to the filaments midlength and open in lengthwise slits towards the middle of the flower. Pollen grains have five slits. The nectar is produced by the ledges of the disc, just above the petal implant. The five styles that rise from the disc are sometimes free from each other at their based and are twisting and fused higher up.

=== Fruit and seed ===
The fruit is a leathery capsule, broadly oval in shape. These contain five spaces that split open outwards from the base of the style when the fruit is ripe by April. Each space contains two shiny black seeds that are shaped like a slightly curved tear drop of 6×3 mm, and are partly covered by a conspicuous scarlet aril that acts as a visual and tactile cue for birds to locate the seeds. Both of the seeds and the aril starkly contrast with the white inside of the fruit (or mericarp). Aborted seeds are greyish. The embryo is green. Ixerba has fifty chromosomes (2n = 50).

== Taxonomy ==
Ixerba has been assigned to different families over time. Traditionally it was regarded related to Roussea and Brexia and has been combined with them in the Brexiaceae. These three have been placed in different other famililies, such as the Escalloniaceae, but doubt remained about their proper placement. After genetic analysis showed that Ixerba was not very much related to either Roussea or Brexia, it was placed in the monogeneric family Ixerbaceae. However, further testing revealed that Ixerba was closely related to the New Caledonian genus Strasburgeria and it was assigned to the Strasburgeriaceae by the APG III in 2009.

=== Phylogeny ===
Fossil remains of Ixerba have been found from the Middle Miocene.

Recent phylogenetic analysis resulted in the following tree.

- - family Strasburgeriaceae
    - Ixerba
    - Strasburgeria
  - Geissolomataceae

=== Etymology ===
The genus name Ixerba is an anagram of Brexia, a treelet from Madagascar and the coast of East Africa, to which it bears a superficial likeness. The species epithet brexioides means "like Brexia".

== Distribution ==
Tawari is a species endemic to the North Island of New Zealand, roughly north of a line crossing Taupō. It is said to be widespread from about Kaitaia south to Waitomo, and Te Urewera, including the Tutamoe Ranges, the Waitākere Ranges, Waipoua Forest, Te Moehau on the Coromandel Peninsula, higher elevations on the Barrier Islands and elsewhere around the Bay of Plenty. Tawari can tolerate altitudes ranging from 500–1200 m but is mostly found in submontane and montane forest.

== Ecology ==
Tawari can often be found together with the New Zealand kauri Agathis australis in the understory of the lowland rain forest. It is common in cloud forest up to 700 m too. The species has a preference for shaded or sheltered locations, often in permanently damp soil and near streams. It is locally abundant but mostly individuals are far between. It is common in regenerating forests along with tawheowheo Quintinia serrata.

Tawari has a mass flowering strategy, attracting a range of visitors with the abundant nectar it produces. Each flower produces on average 18 μl of nectar with an average concentration of 20% brix. Pollination is mainly by birds, however in modified forest where birds a few in number, flower visitation is most frequently by large flies and moths, followed by honey bees, bumblebees, native bees, wasps and beetles. Floral morphology, such as its wide spreading anthers, suggest adaptation to pollination by birds. Seeds capsules develop between January and April each year, and dehisce to reveal up to ten glossy, purple-black seeds that are partly covered by an orange fleshy aril. Seeds are primarily dispersed by birds, with reports including kererū, pōpokotea, hihi, and kākā.

== Use ==
Tawari is a rich source of nectar, which is often so abundant that bees produce monofloral honey, that is the honey is chiefly made of nectar from tawari flowers. Tawari honey is regularly for sale from food shops in New Zealand. The nectar contains a lot of fructose and much water. The honey may be thin as a consequence, but nonetheless crystallizes quickly. The honey has a light colour and tastes a bit like butterscotch. It contains relatively few pollen, and if at least 20% of the pollen is tawari, it can be marketed as tawari honey. Bark can produce a black dye that is known to be used on flax. Māori people traditionally used the flowers to make necklaces and other adornments to be worn at festivities.

== Cultivation ==
Tawari is known to be very difficult to grow in gardens. It needs a sheltered location, humus-rich soil and good drainage, but the soil should never dry out. The species probably depends on a mycorrhiza, and if planted next to Kapuka Griselinia littoralis, tawari does much better.

== External sources ==
Photo series illustrating many details of the anatomy
