= Dalrympelea =

Scientific classification
- Kingdom: Plantae
- Clade: Tracheophytes
- Clade: Angiosperms
- Clade: Eudicots
- Clade: Rosids
- Order: Crossosomatales
- Family: Staphyleaceae
- Genus: Dalrympelea; Roxb.

Genus of flowering plants

Dalrympelea is a genus of flowering plants belonging to the family Staphyleaceae.

Its native range is Tropical Asia.

The genus is named in honour of Alexander Dalrymple (1737–1808), a Scottish geographer. and was published in first published in Pl. Coromandel Vol.3 on page 76 in 1820.

== Description ==
Extrafloral nectaries have been reported on the rachis of D. trifoliata.

== Species ==
Species known:

- Dalrympelea borneensis (Merr. & L.M.Perry) Nor-Ezzaw.
- Dalrympelea calciphila (J.T.Pereira) Nor-Ezzaw.
- Dalrympelea grandis (B.L.Linden) Nor-Ezzaw.
- Dalrympelea nitida (Merr. & L.M.Perry) Nor-Ezzaw.
- Dalrympelea pomifera Roxb.
- Dalrympelea sphaerocarpa (Hassk.) Nor-Ezzaw.
- Dalrympelea stipulacea (B.L.Linden) Nor-Ezzaw.
- Dalrympelea trifoliata (Ridl.) Nor-Ezzaw.
