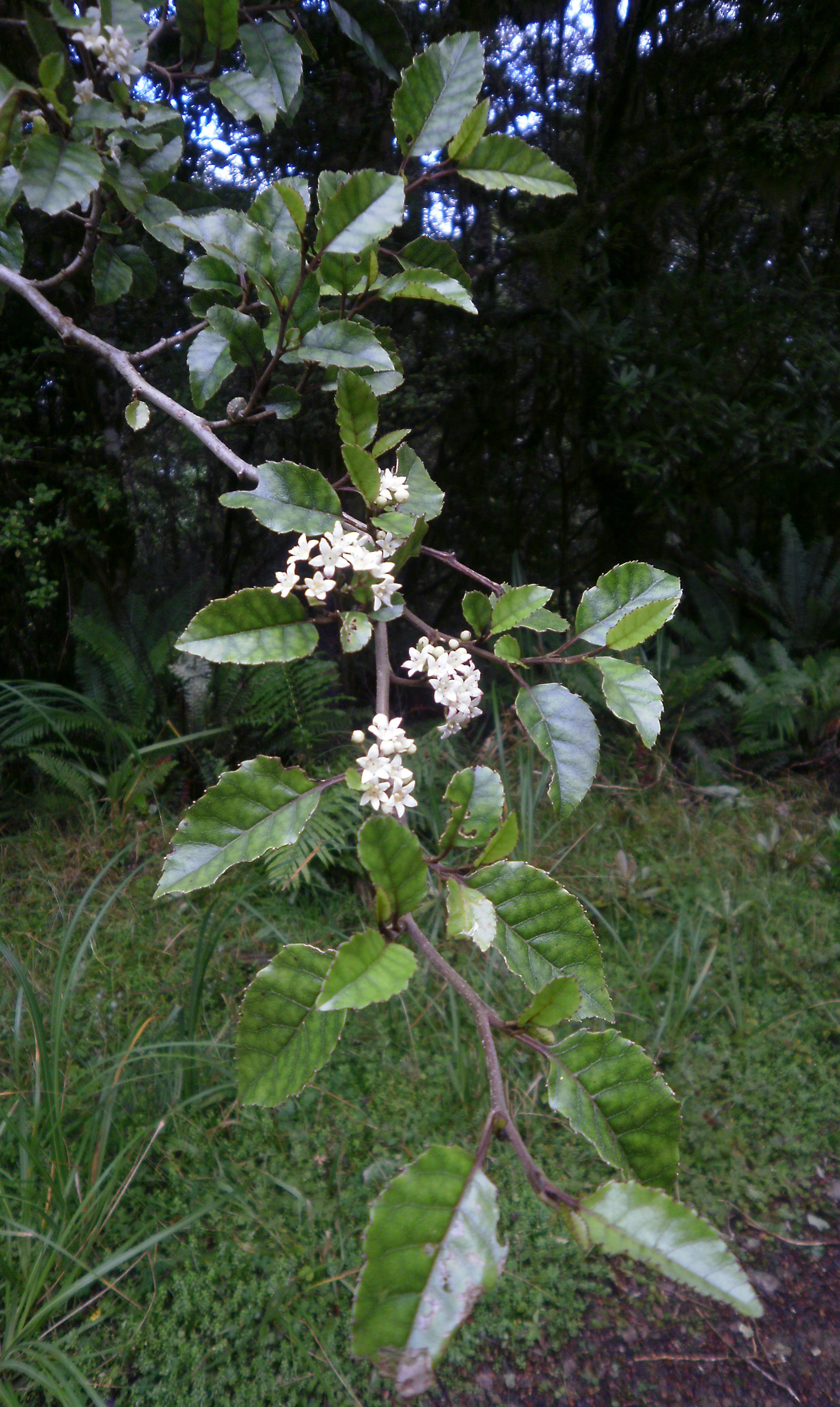
- Carpodetus serratus in New Zealand

Scientific classification
- Kingdom: Plantae
- Clade: Tracheophytes
- Clade: Angiosperms
- Clade: Eudicots
- Clade: Asterids
- Order: Asterales
- Family: Rousseaceae
- Subfamily: Carpodetoideae
- Genus: Carpodetus; J.R.Forst. & G.Forst.

Species
- See text

= Carpodetus =

Genus of flowering plants

Carpodetus is a genus of flowering plants in the Rousseaceae family. It was formerly considered to lie within the Escalloniaceae. Its species occur in New Guinea, New Zealand, the Solomon Islands, and Vanuatu. The genus is characterised by small trees with alternate, evergreen leaves, bearing small white flowers with few stamens.

== Species ==
Described species include:

- Carpodetus amplus Reeder
- Carpodetus arboreus (Lauterb. & K.Schum.) Schltr.
- Carpodetus archboldianus Reeder
- Carpodetus denticulatus (Ridl.) Reeder
- Carpodetus flexuosus (Ridl.) Reeder
- Carpodetus fuscus Reeder
- Carpodetus grandiflorus Schltr.
- Carpodetus major Schltr.
- Carpodetus montanus (Ridl.) Reeder
- Carpodetus pullei Schltr.
- Carpodetus serratus J.R.Forst. & G.Forst. New Zealand

== Taxonomy ==
Carpodetus and its type species C. serratus were first described by father and son Forster in 1773 and placed in the Saxifragaceae. In 1934 it was assigned to the newly created Escalloniaceae by Hutchinson in his major revision of the dicotyledon families. In the APG III system, Carpodetus has been referred to the Rousseaceae.

=== Phylogeny ===
Carpodetus is the sister to the clade consisting of Abrophyllum and Cuttsia. Roussea is sister to the rest of the family and is geographically most distanced from the other genera. Most related to this family are the Campanulaceae. This results in the following phylogenetic tree.

- order Asterales
  - - family Campanulaceae (± cosmopolitan)
    - family Rousseaceae
      - subfamily Rousseoideae
        Roussea (Mauritius)
      - subfamily Carpodetoideae
        - (eastern Australia)
          - Abrophyllum
          - Cuttsia
        - Carpodetus (New Guinea, Solomon Islands, Vanuatu, New Zealand)
  - other Asterales families

=== Etymology ===
Carpodetus is derived from the Greek words καρπός (karpos) (fruit) and detus (bound together), a reference that the seeds are bound together in clusters in the berry.
