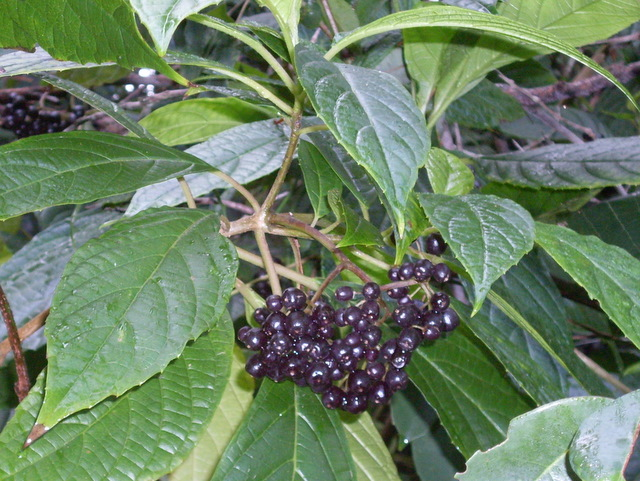
- Abrophyllum ornans
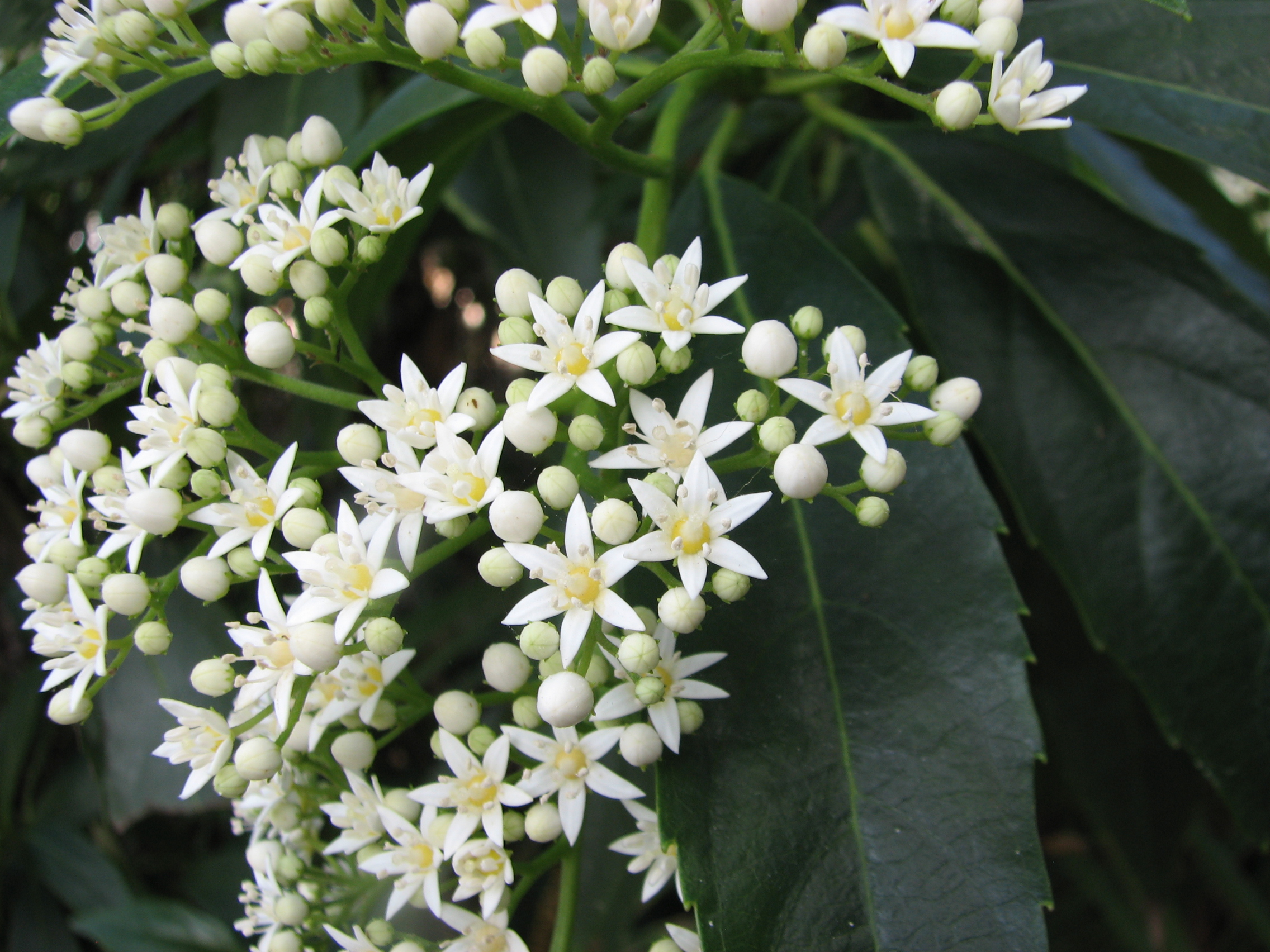
- Cuttsia viburnea

Scientific classification
- Kingdom: Plantae
- Clade: Tracheophytes
- Clade: Angiosperms
- Clade: Eudicots
- Clade: Asterids
- Order: Asterales
- Family: Rousseaceae; Hook.f. ex Benth.

Genera
- Abrophyllum; Carpodetus; Cuttsia; Roussea

Synonyms
- Carpodetaceae

= Rousseaceae =

Family of shrubs

Rousseaceae is a plant family in the order Asterales containing trees and shrubs. The fruit is a berry or capsule. Leaves are simple, with toothed margins. Leaf stipules are not seen in this group.

The family contains four genera and twelve or thirteen species. From Mauritius, Australia, New Guinea, New Zealand and a few other Pacific Islands. The genera Abrophyllum, Cuttsia and Carpodetus have been formerly placed in a separate family, Carpodetaceae, or within Escalloniaceae.

== Taxonomy ==
Roussea is sister to the remainder of the family and is most distanced from the other genera. Carpodetus is the sister to the clade consisting of Abrophyllum and Cuttsia. This results in the following phylogenetic tree.

- order Asterales
  - - family Campanulaceae (± cosmopolitan)
    - family Rousseaceae
      - subfamily Rousseoideae
        Roussea(Mauritius)
      - subfamily Carpodetoideae
        - (eastern Australia)
          - Abrophyllum
          - Cuttsia
        - Carpodetus(New Guinea, Solomon Islands, Vanuatu, New Zealand)
  - other Asterales families
