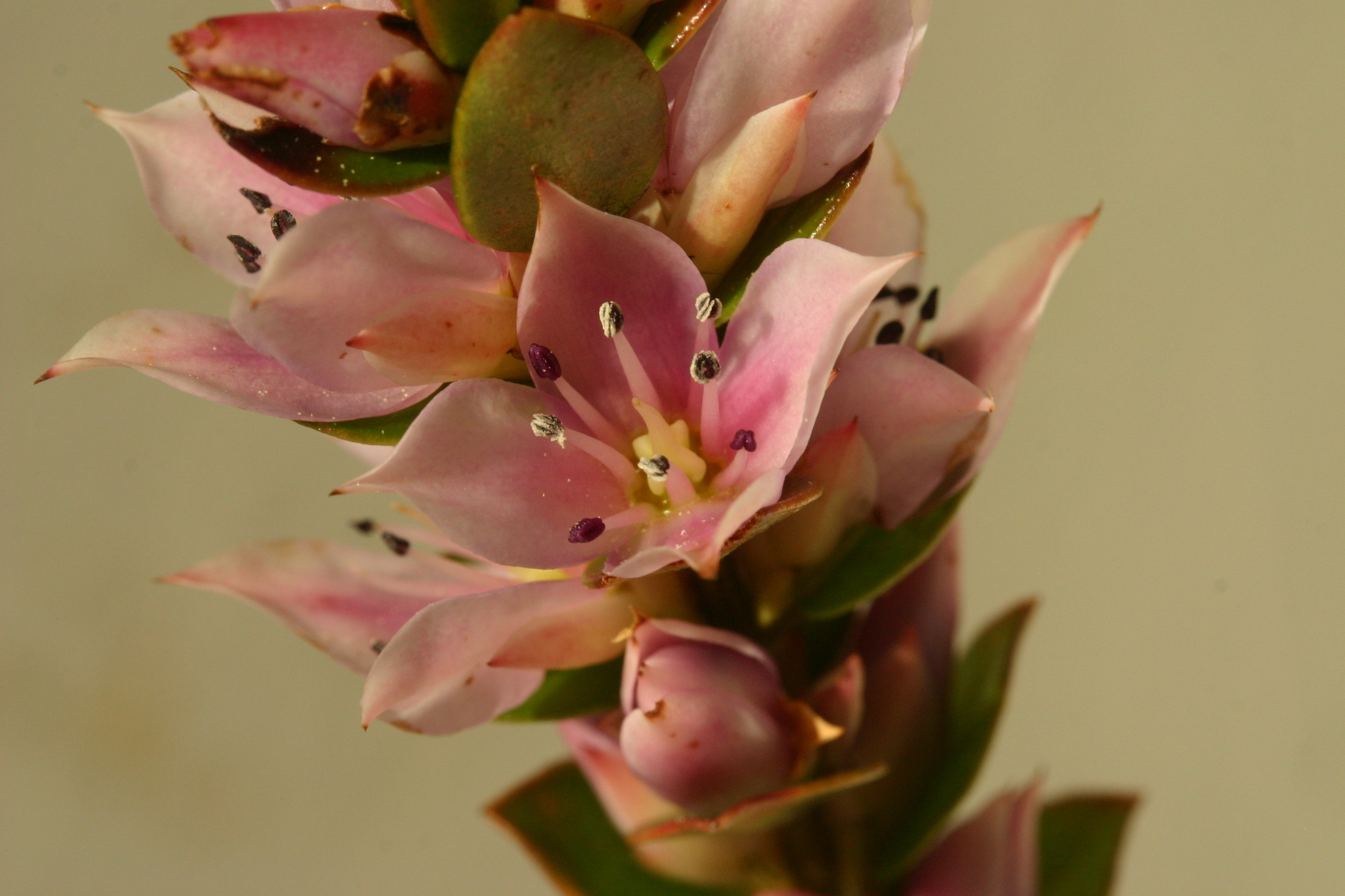

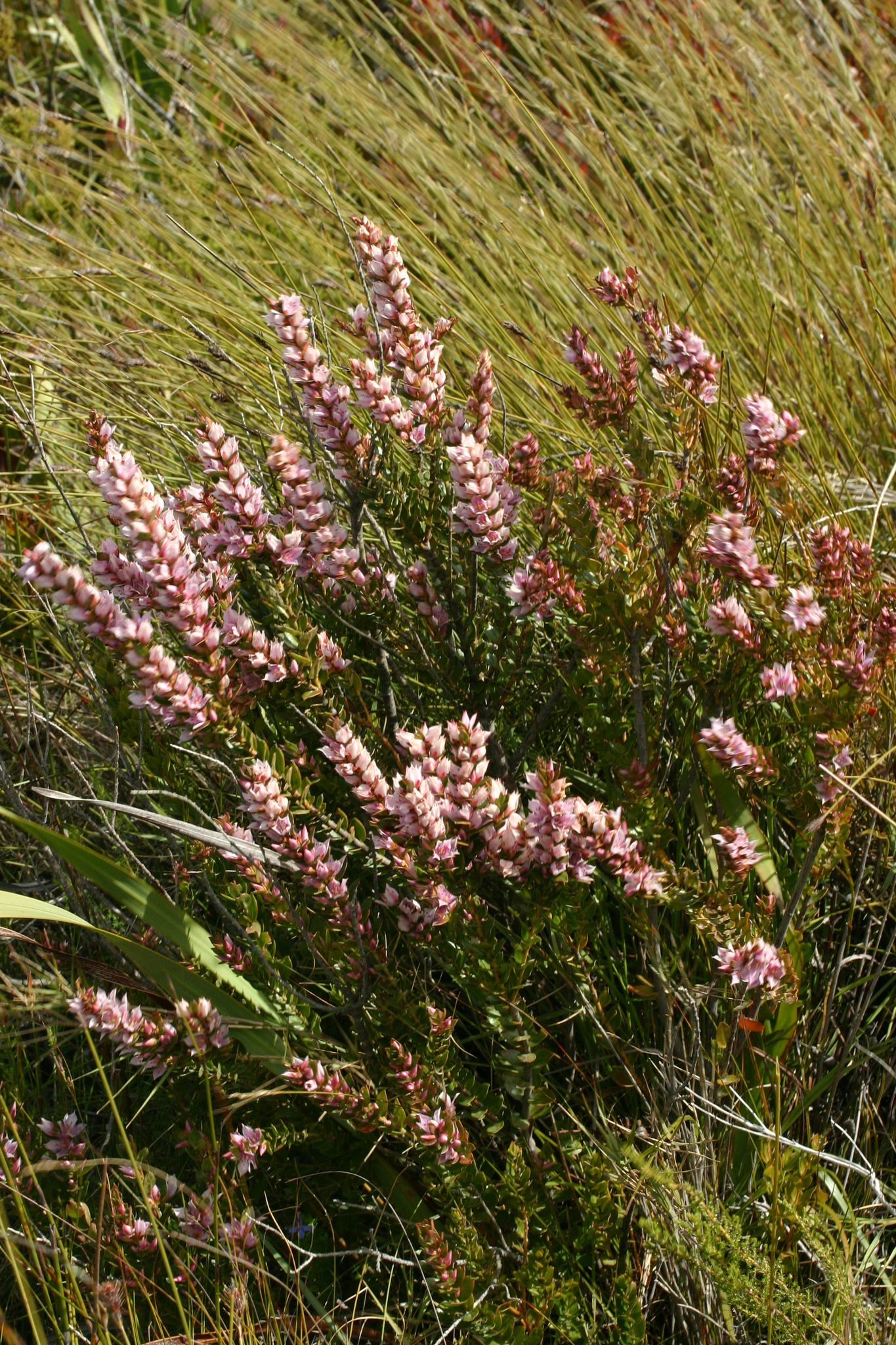

Scientific classification
- Kingdom: Plantae
- Clade: Embryophytes
- Clade: Tracheophytes
- Clade: Angiosperms
- Clade: Eudicots
- Clade: Rosids
- Order: Crossosomatales
- Family: Geissolomataceae; A.DC.
- Genus: Geissoloma; Lindl. ex Kunth
- Species: G. marginatum

Binomial name
- Geissoloma marginatum (L.) Juss.

= Geissoloma =

Monotypic genus of flowering plants native to South Africa

Geissoloma is a genus of flowering plants in the monotypic family Geissolomataceae, native to the Cape Province of South Africa. Geissoloma marginatum is the only species in the family. It is sometimes called guyalone in English. The plants are xerophytic evergreen shrubs and are known to accumulate aluminum.

== Description ==
Geissoloma marginatum is a low evergreen shrub of 0.5–1.25 m (1 ft 8 in – 4 ft 1 in) high, covered in overlapping large, leathery, simple, scale-like, opposite leaves in four rows along the stems. It has very small stipules on the petioles. Flowers are bisexual, subtended by bracts, and have four red to pinkish petaloid sepals, four petals partially united, eight stamens, and four carpels. The fruit is a capsule with four seeds.

== Phylogeny ==
Recent phylogenetic analysis resulted in the following tree.

- - Geissoloma
  - family Strasburgeriaceae
    - Ixerba
    - Strasburgeria
