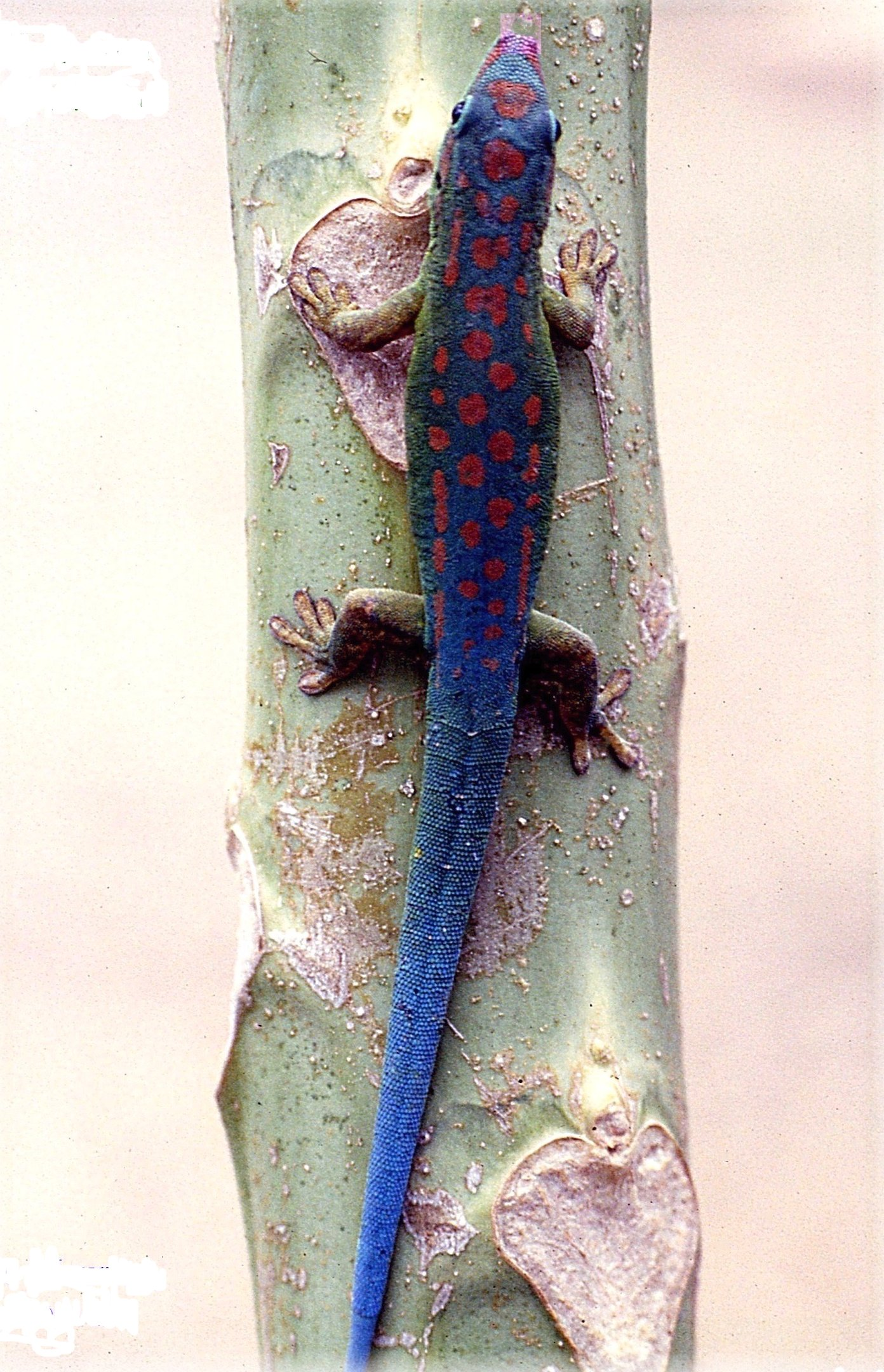
- Male, Senneville, Mauritius
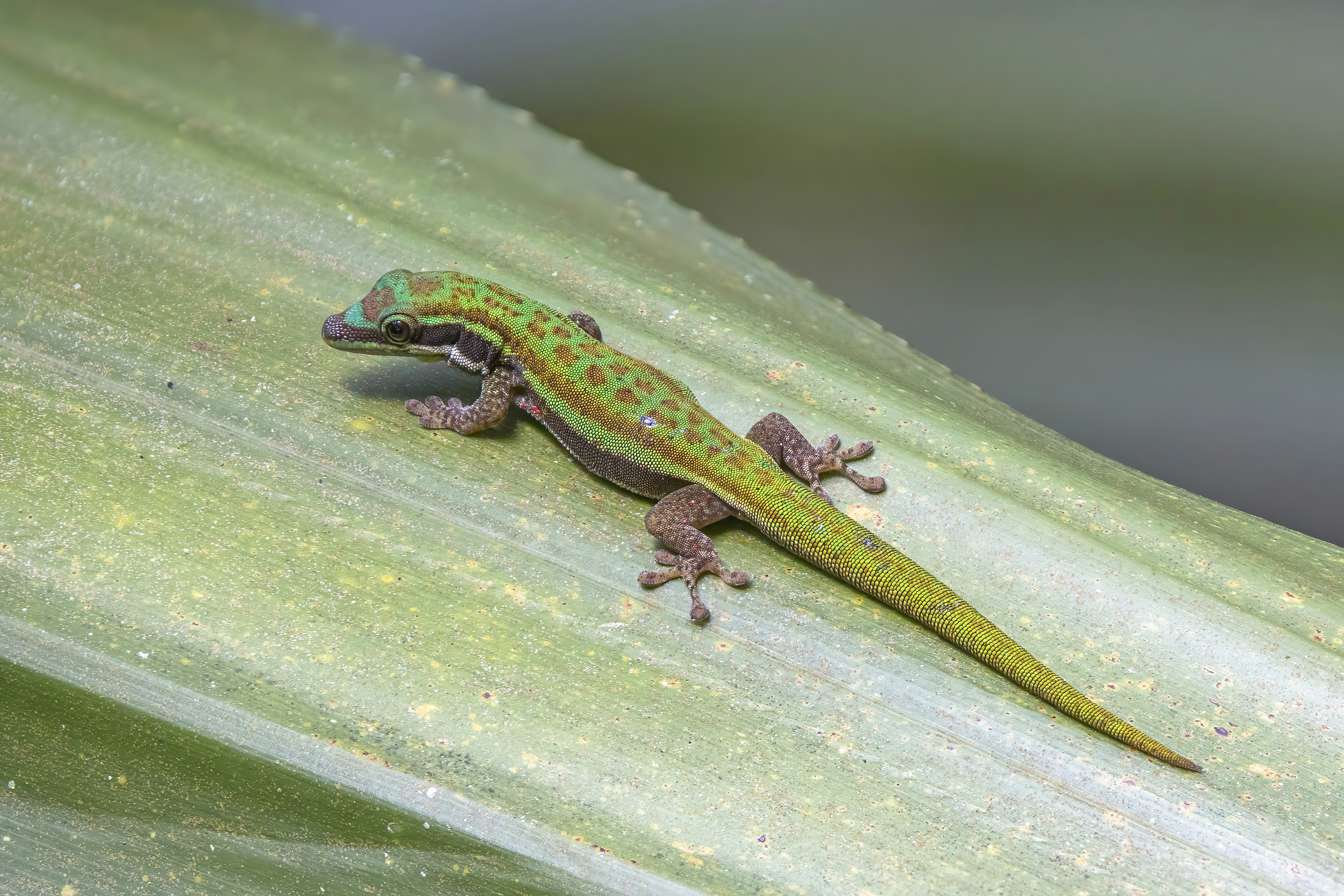
- Female, Ebony Forest Reserve Chamarel, Mauritius

Conservation status
- Least Concern (IUCN 3.1)

Scientific classification
- Kingdom: Animalia
- Phylum: Chordata
- Class: Reptilia
- Order: Squamata
- Suborder: Gekkota
- Family: Gekkonidae
- Genus: Phelsuma
- Species: P. cepediana

Binomial name
- Phelsuma cepediana (Milbert, 1812)
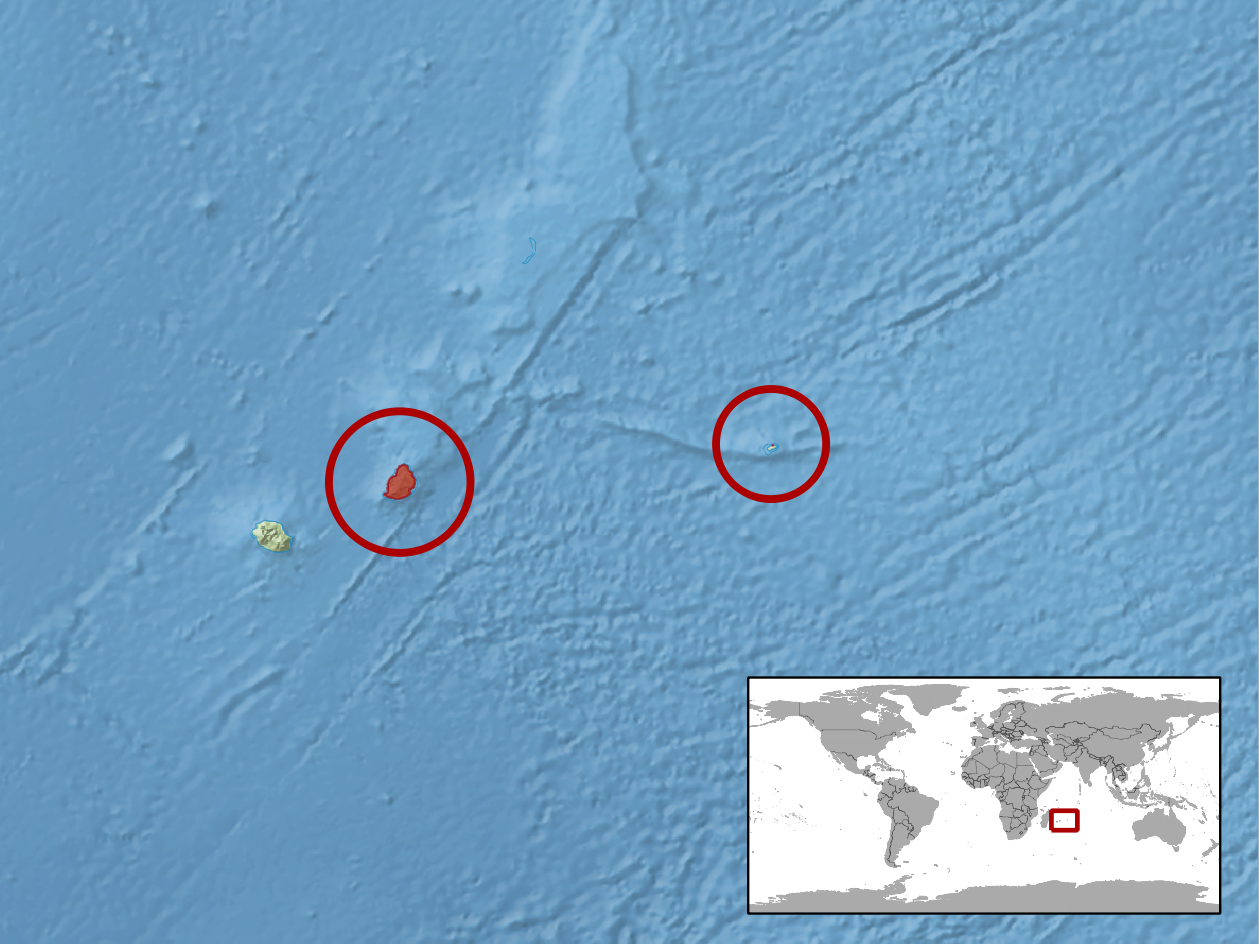

Synonyms
- Gecko cepedianus Milbert, 1812; Phelsuma crepidianus Gray, 1825; Phelsuma ornatum Gray, 1825; Anoplopus cepedeanus Wagler, 1830; Platydactylus cepedianus A.M.C. Duméril & Bibron, 1836; Phelsuma trilineatum Gray, 1842; Phelsuma cepedianum Boulenger, 1885; Phelsuma cepediana Mertens, 1962

= Blue-tailed day gecko =

Species of lizard

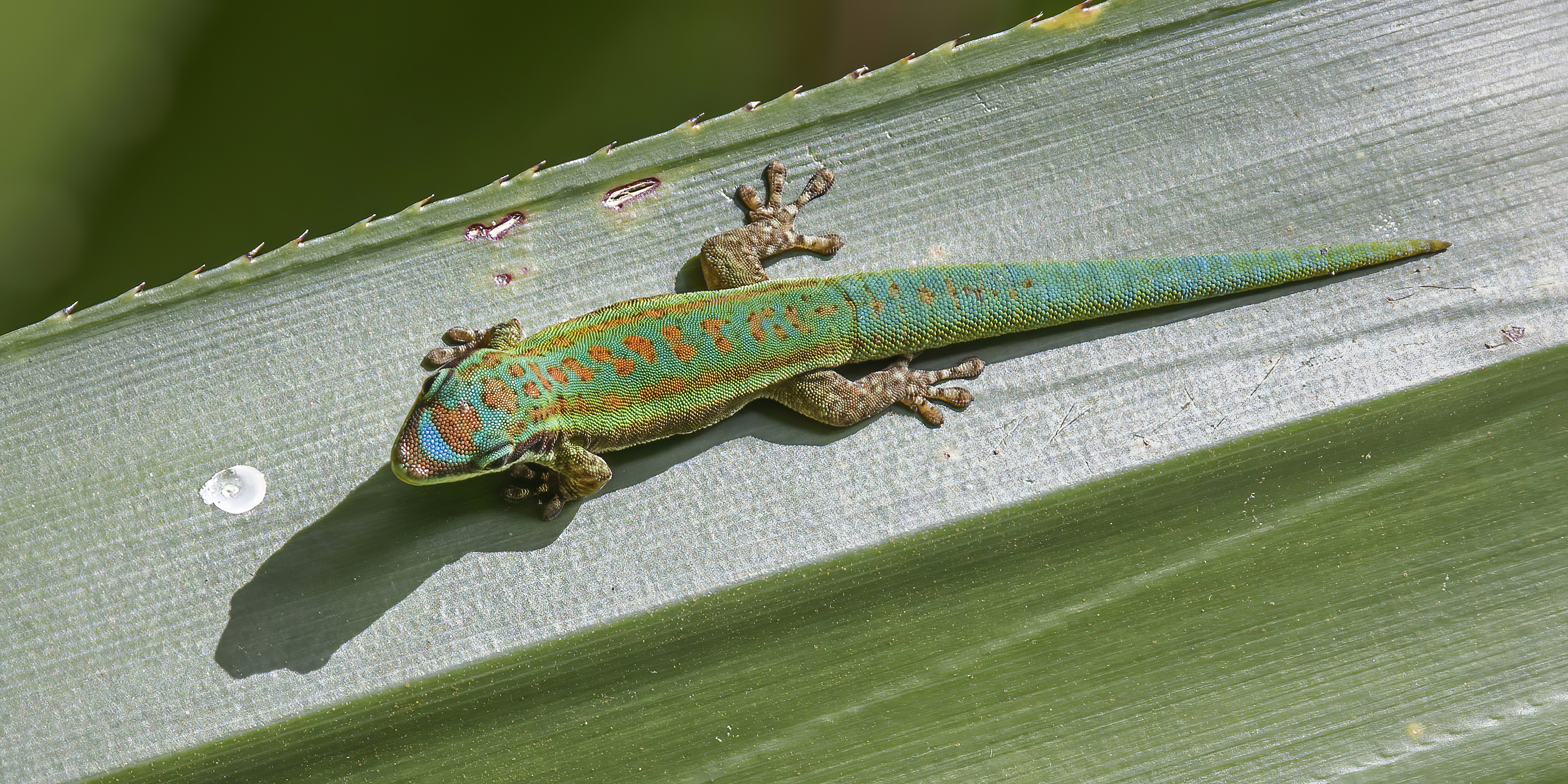
Female

The blue-tailed day gecko (Phelsuma cepediana), also known commonly as Lacépède's gecko, is a diurnal species of gecko, a lizard in the family Gekkonidae. The species is endemic to the island Mauritius. It typically inhabits warm and humid places and dwells on different trees and bushes.

Additionally, it is noteworthy that the blue-tailed day gecko can change colors and patterns ontogenetically. Depending on the activity, coloration can differ.

== Etymology ==
The specific name, cepediana, is in honor of French naturalist Bernard Germain de Lacépède.

== Description ==
P. cepediana is a mid-sized day gecko. It can reach a total length (including tail) of 3.75–5.5 in (9.5–14 cm). The female blue-tailed gecko is usually smaller in size than the male.

The male blue-tailed geckos is typically more vivid than the female. The male body colour is light green or bluish green. The back of the male has a bright blue colour and is covered with dark red spots and dashes. The male has a deep blue tail; this blue color may also be found on the face. The female lacks the brilliant blue colour of the male. The female has a bright green back and rust-coloured spots. There is always a dorso-lateral stripe present, which may be broken. A red stripe extends from the nostril to the shoulder.

== Habitat and distribution ==
The blue-tailed gecko and other reptiles are sensitive to artificial light at night and will change their behaviors as a result of being exposed to this light. The blue-tailed gecko is primarily diurnal, as are most of the geckos in its genus (Phelsuma). It has been found that the blue-tailed gecko will change its foraging behavior from diurnal to nocturnal in situations in which it has artificial light sources at its disposal. Nocturnal activity includes agonistic or aggressive behaviors, courtship, and foraging. When artificial lights are used in nocturnal situations, it alters the amount of time and effort that visual predators will spend foraging.

P. cepediana is one of only seven species of the Mascarene species that is still extant. This species is the sole pollinator and seed disperser of a climbing shrub, Roussea simplex, which is endemic to the mountains of Mauritius. P. cepediana can typically be found on trees and bushes that produce fruits, such as coconut palms, banana trees, and papayas. These locations are warm and moist climates, which are preferred by this gecko.

The blue-tailed day gecko inhabits the island Mauritius where it is widely distributed. P. cepediana may also have been introduced to Madagascar where it has been reported a few times, amongst others in the region of Iviloina. These observations have not been confirmed, however. Although P. cepediana seems to be unable to colonize agricultural areas, it can survive in suburban gardens that are heavily watered and planted as long as these gardens are near trees that produce fruit or flowers throughout the year.

== Diet ==
The blue-tailed day gecko feeds on various insects and other invertebrates. It also licks soft, sweet fruit, pollen, and nectar. The flowers of the now critically endangered liana Roussea simplex produce copious amounts of nectar and are pollinated only by the blue-tailed day gecko. The blue-tailed day gecko plays a role by licking up a gelatinous substance secreted by the fruit which contains the minute seeds. It disperses the seeds in its droppings.

== Behavior ==
P. cepediana can be quite aggressive toward both its own and to other Phelsuma species. In captivity, where the female cannot escape, the male sometimes seriously wounds the female. In this case, the male and female must be separated.

=== Protective coloration and behavior ===
Lizards can change in color and pattern ontogenetically. Conspicuous tail colors appear only in juveniles and can fade by adulthood. Research has been conducted in order to determine if these tail colors compensate for "an increased activity, level, deflecting imminent attacks to the tail." Research has suggested that alteration of activities can affect the ontogenetic color and pattern changes. Lizards that are active and forage in habitats that are open tend to increase the probability that they will be attacked by ambush predators. Deflection displays and conspicuous colors can shift attacks to the expendable tail. By doing this, the prey's overall likelihood of surviving the attack is increased.

== Reproduction ==
The adult female blue-tailed gecko lays eggs every 3–4 weeks. It typically lays two eggs in a clutch.

The female will lay its eggs in a location that it feels is safe and protected. It will glue its eggs in order to increase safety. When they are kept at a temperature of 28 degrees Celsius, the eggs take between 40 and 45 days to hatch. When the newborns are measured, they are normally around 40 mm (1.6 inches).

== Predators ==
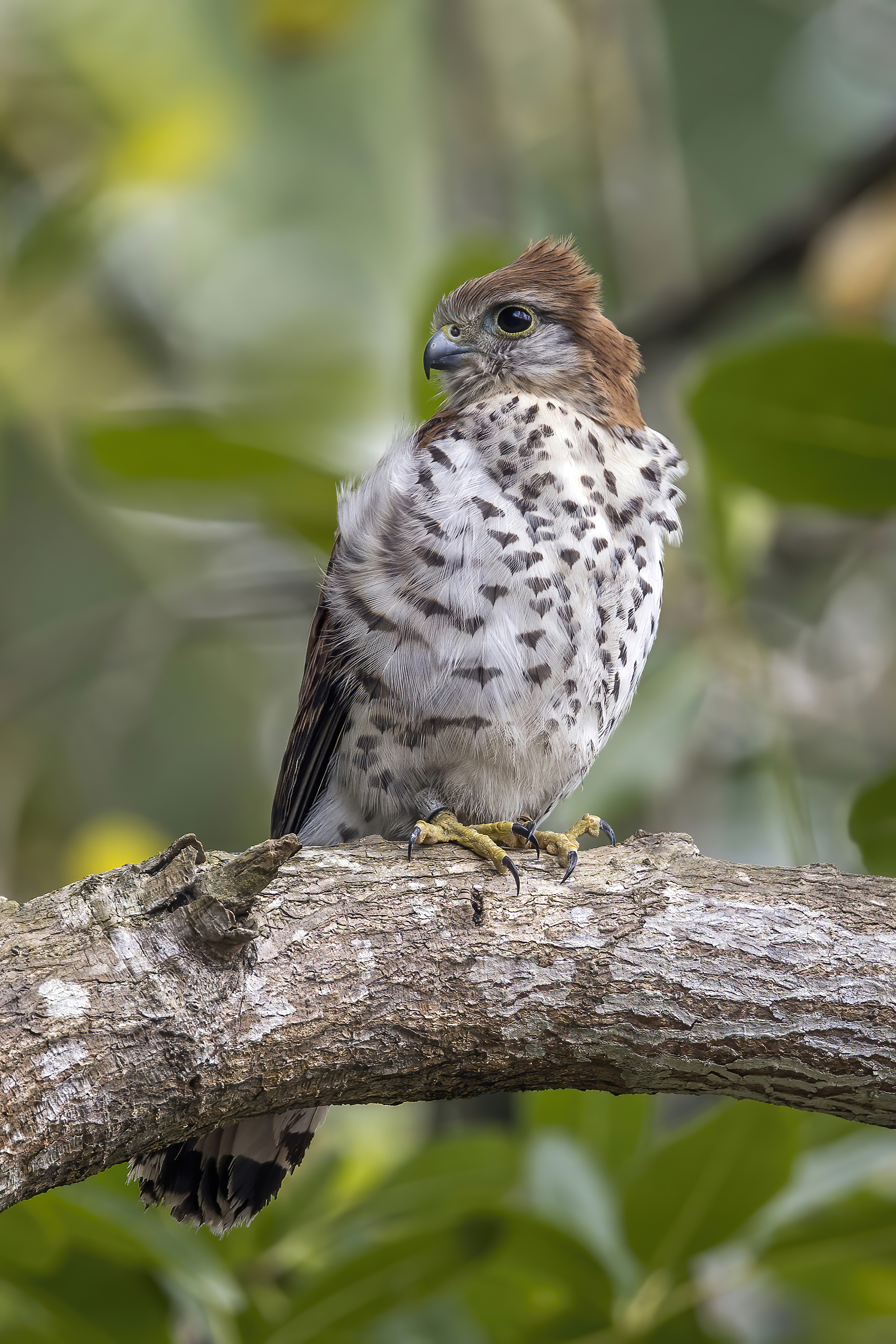
The Mauritius kestrel preys on the blue tailed gecko

The blue-tailed gecko frequently will hide amongst dense patches of palm-like Pandanus plants in order to protect itself from its enemies. P. cepediana is preyed upon by the critically endangered Mauritius kestrel. This bird feeds almost exclusively on Phelsuma geckos, making P. cepediana one of its main prey items. Other birds that are endemic to Mauritius also feed on Phelsuma geckos.

The 2mm-long ant Technomyrmex albipes that was introduced to Mauritius from the Indo-Pacific area seals the flowers of Roussea with clay to protect mealy bugs. The mealy bugs drink the sap and excrete a sugary urine that is collected by the ants. The ants attack animals that visit the plant, preventing the blue-tailed day gecko from pollinating the flowers and eating from the fruit, and in this way seriously hampering Roussea's reproduction.

== Captivity ==
Male P. cepediana are extremely high in demand as pets due to their vibrant coloration, and can cost $100 to $200 each. With good care, blue-tailed day geckos may live up to 15 years.
