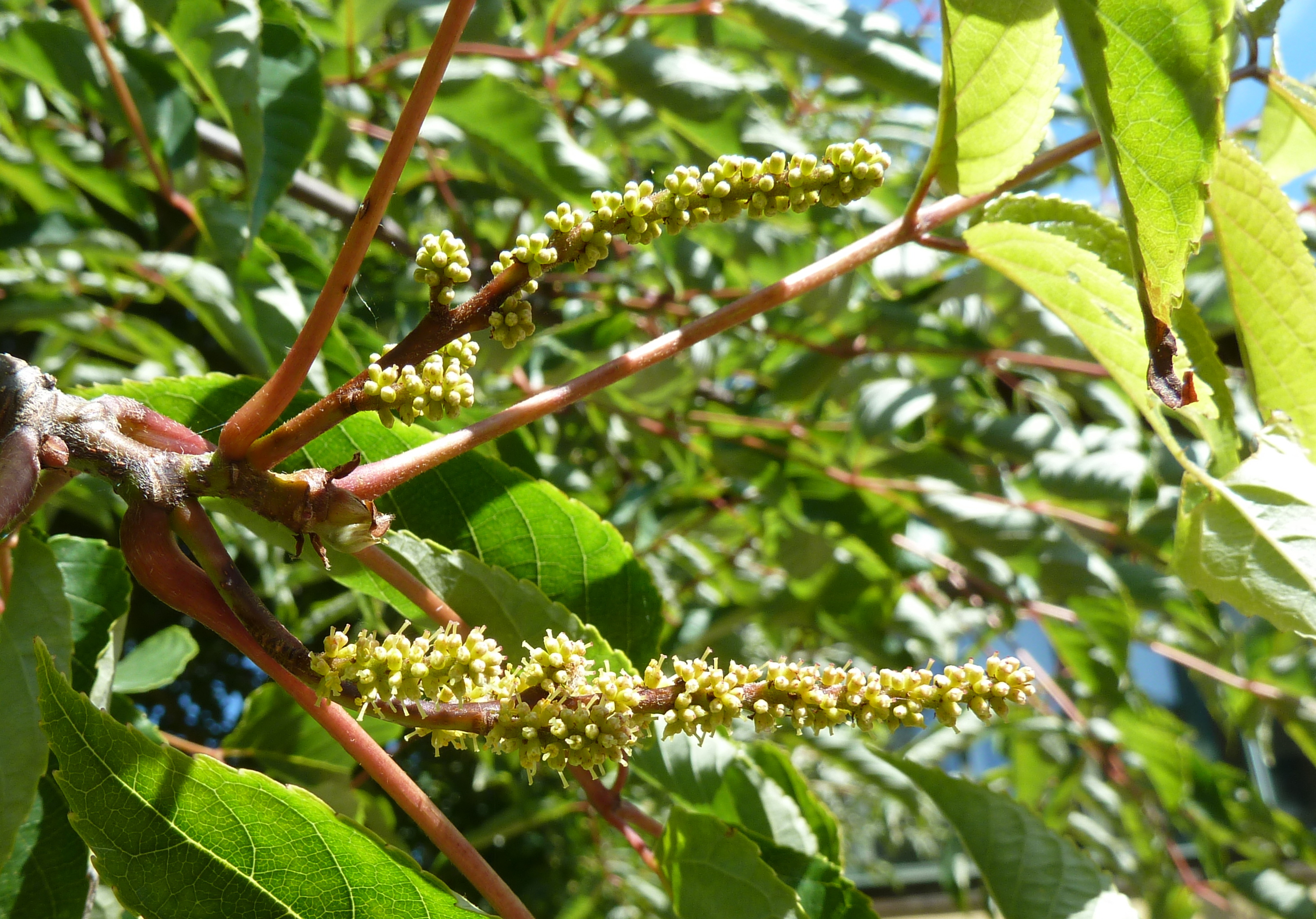

Conservation status
- Vulnerable (IUCN 2.3)

Scientific classification
- Kingdom: Plantae
- Clade: Tracheophytes
- Clade: Angiosperms
- Clade: Eudicots
- Clade: Rosids
- Order: Huerteales
- Family: Tapisciaceae
- Genus: Tapiscia
- Species: T. sinensis

Binomial name
- Tapiscia sinensis Oliv.

= Tapiscia sinensis =

Species of flowering plant

Tapiscia sinensis is a species of plant in the Tapisciaceae family. It is endemic to China. It is threatened by habitat loss.
