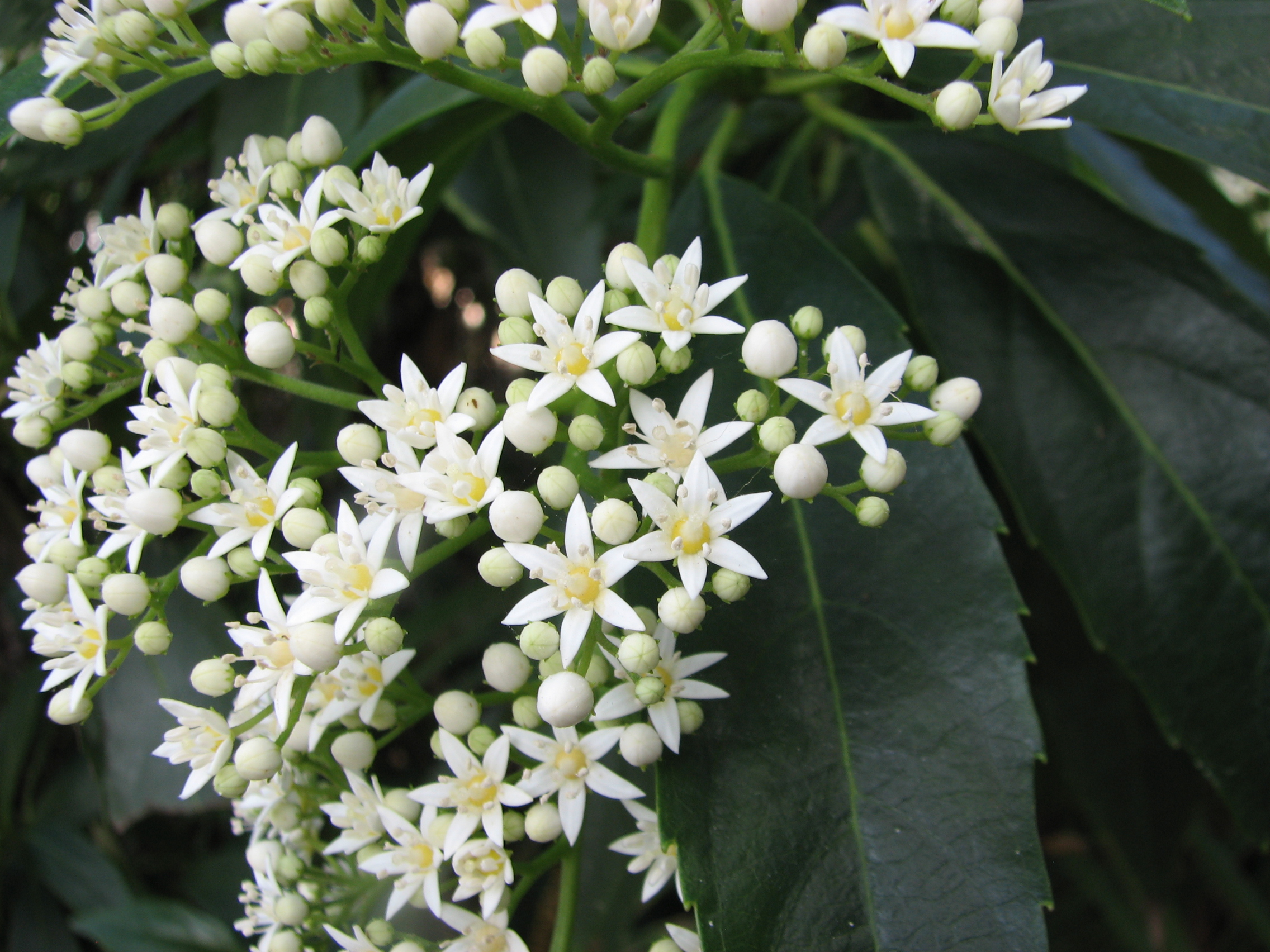
- Cuttsia viburnea

Scientific classification
- Kingdom: Plantae
- Clade: Tracheophytes
- Clade: Angiosperms
- Clade: Eudicots
- Clade: Asterids
- Order: Asterales
- Family: Rousseaceae
- Subfamily: Carpodetoideae
- Genus: Cuttsia; F.Muell.
- Species: C. viburnea

Binomial name
- Cuttsia viburnea F.Muell.

= Cuttsia =

Genus of flowering plants

Cuttsia viburnea is a shrub or bushy tree which has toothed leaves and panicles of white flowers, and that is endemic to eastern Australia. It is sometimes called silver-leaved cuttsia, and confusingly also native elderberry, honey bush or native hydrangea (because these names are also used for other native Australian species). C. viburnea is the only species assigned to the genus Cuttsia.

== Description ==
The silver-leaved cuttsia is a shrub or bushy tree of up to 15 m high. Its branchlets however are initially herbaceous and have conspicuous lenticels. Young shoots and inflorescences have hairs that are flat against the surface. Leaves are alternately arranged along the stems. The leaf stem is 1.5-4.5 cm long. The leaf blades are hairless, soft and thin in texture, bright green and shiny above with a paler underside, oval with the widest point at or beyond midlength, 8–20 × 2–6.5 cm. Its foot gradually narrows into the leaf stem, the edge is uniformly toothed and each tooth ends in a gland, and its tip is pointed. The secondary veins emerge at about 45° from the main vein and strongly curve, with their ends parallel to the edge of the leaf.

The inflorescence is a multi-flowered panicle of 8–18 cm long. The symmetrical star-shaped flowers are pentamerous and pleasantly honey scented. The five triangular green sepals are less than 1 mm long. The five free white petals are long inverted tear-shaped 3–4 mm long and have a pointy tip. The five narrow white filaments alternate with the petals and are topped with anthers shorter than the filament, that shed cream-colored pollen. Pollen is tricolpate, triangular from a polar perspective and round from an equatorial perspective, about 20 μm, has a netted surface structure and is not shed in clusters of four but individually (microscope). On top of the yellowish disc sits a narrow white style that has a stigma with five lobes. Flowers can be found from October to December. The fruit is a green to light brown globose to ovoid capsule of 3–4 mm long, each locule of which opens separately. Seeds are minute and ovoid in shape.

=== Differences with related taxa ===
Cuttsia has white flowers with filaments longer than the anthers, a definite style and dry capsules, while Abrophyllum has creamy yellow flowers with filaments shorter than the anther, a seated stigma and the fruit is a berry that is black when ripe. In Cuttsia the ovary is superior, the stigma has five lobes and the seeds are small and ovate, while in Carpodetus the ovary is semi-inferior and topped by a conspicuous disc, the stigma is undivided and the seeds are angular, while the fruit is a black or greyish berry.

== Taxonomy ==
The genus and species were first formally described by botanist Ferdinand von Mueller in 1865 in Fragmenta Phytographiae Australiae.

=== Modern classification ===
Cuttsia is most related to Abrophyllum and Carpodetus and these were joined in the Carpodetaceae. Recent genetic analysis showed a close relationship of this cluster with Roussea, an endemic of Mauritius, and these now constitute the Rousseaceae.

=== Phylogeny ===
The following tree represents the current insights in the relationships of Roussea with other taxa.

- - family Campanulaceae
  - - subfamily Rousseoideae
      Roussea
    - subfamily Carpodetoideae
      - - Abrophyllum
        - Cuttsia
      - Carpodetus

== Distribution ==
The silver-leaved cuttsia grows on the East-coast of Australia between Noosa Heads, Queensland and Newcastle, New South Wales and a few isolated locations in the mountains of Queensland.

== Ecology ==
The silver-leaved cuttsia occurs in subtropical and warm-temperate rainforest, and has a preference for locations with more light such as margins, regrowth, and along steams. The species is self-infertile. The flowers produce nectar and are visited by an array of different insects. Adults of the jewel beetle Calodema regalis are said to feed on Cuttsia.
