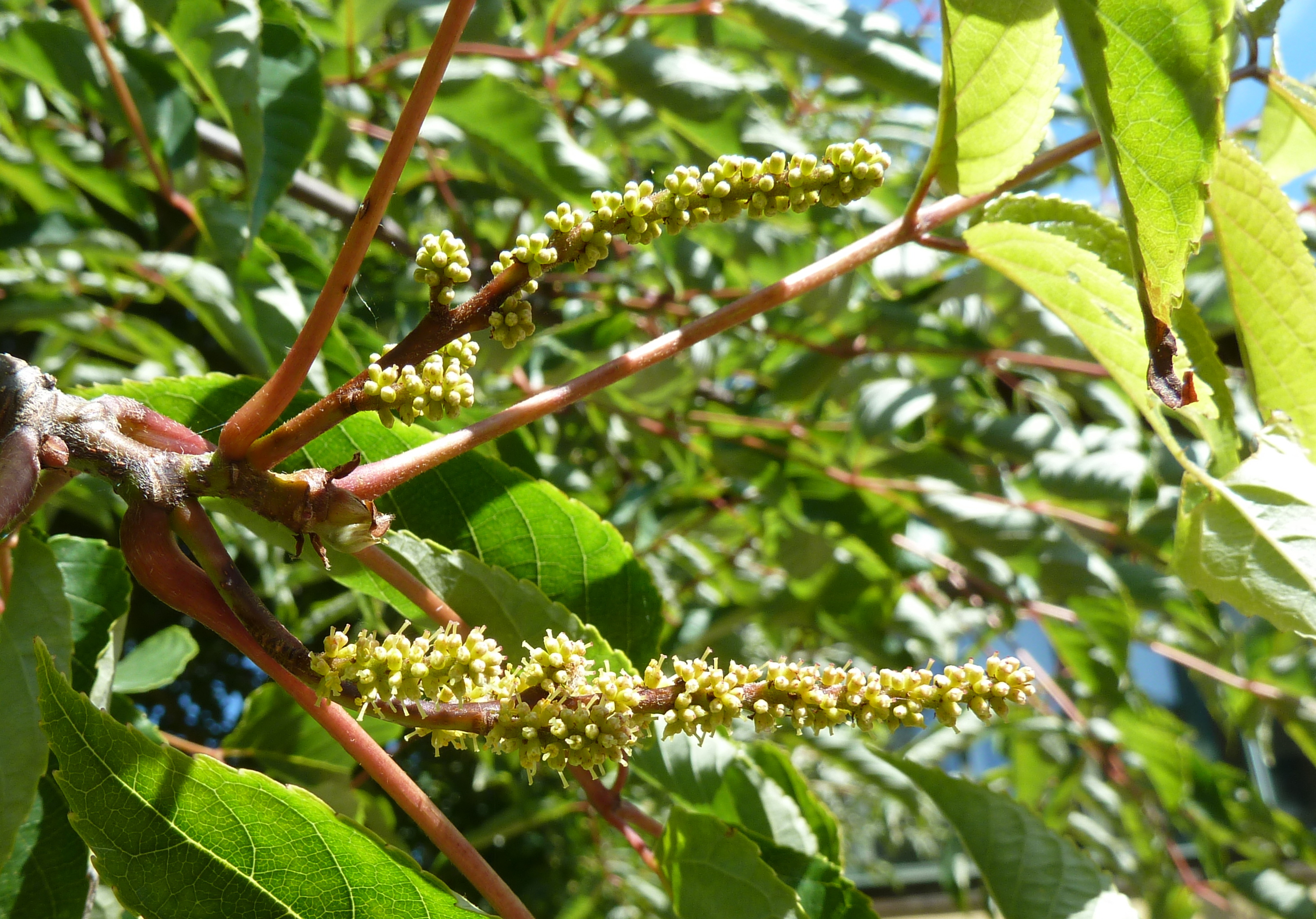
- T. sinensis flowering branch

Scientific classification
- Kingdom: Plantae
- Clade: Tracheophytes
- Clade: Angiosperms
- Clade: Eudicots
- Clade: Rosids
- Order: Huerteales
- Family: Tapisciaceae
- Genus: Tapiscia; Oliv.

Species
- Tapiscia sinensis Tapiscia yunnanensis

= Tapiscia =

Genus of flowering plants

Tapiscia is a genus of flowering plants in the family Tapisciaceae. Some authors recognize only one species, Tapiscia sinensis. Other authors recognize two species, T. sinensis and T. yunnanensis.
