= Huertea =

Scientific classification
- Kingdom: Plantae
- Clade: Tracheophytes
- Clade: Angiosperms
- Clade: Eudicots
- Clade: Rosids
- Order: Huerteales
- Family: Tapisciaceae
- Genus: Huertea; Ruiz & Pav.

Species
- See text

Genus of flowering plants

Huertea is a genus of plant in family Tapisciaceae. It is native to central and south America. Species include:

- Huertea cubensis
- Huertea glandulosa
- Huertea granadina
- Huertea putumayensis
