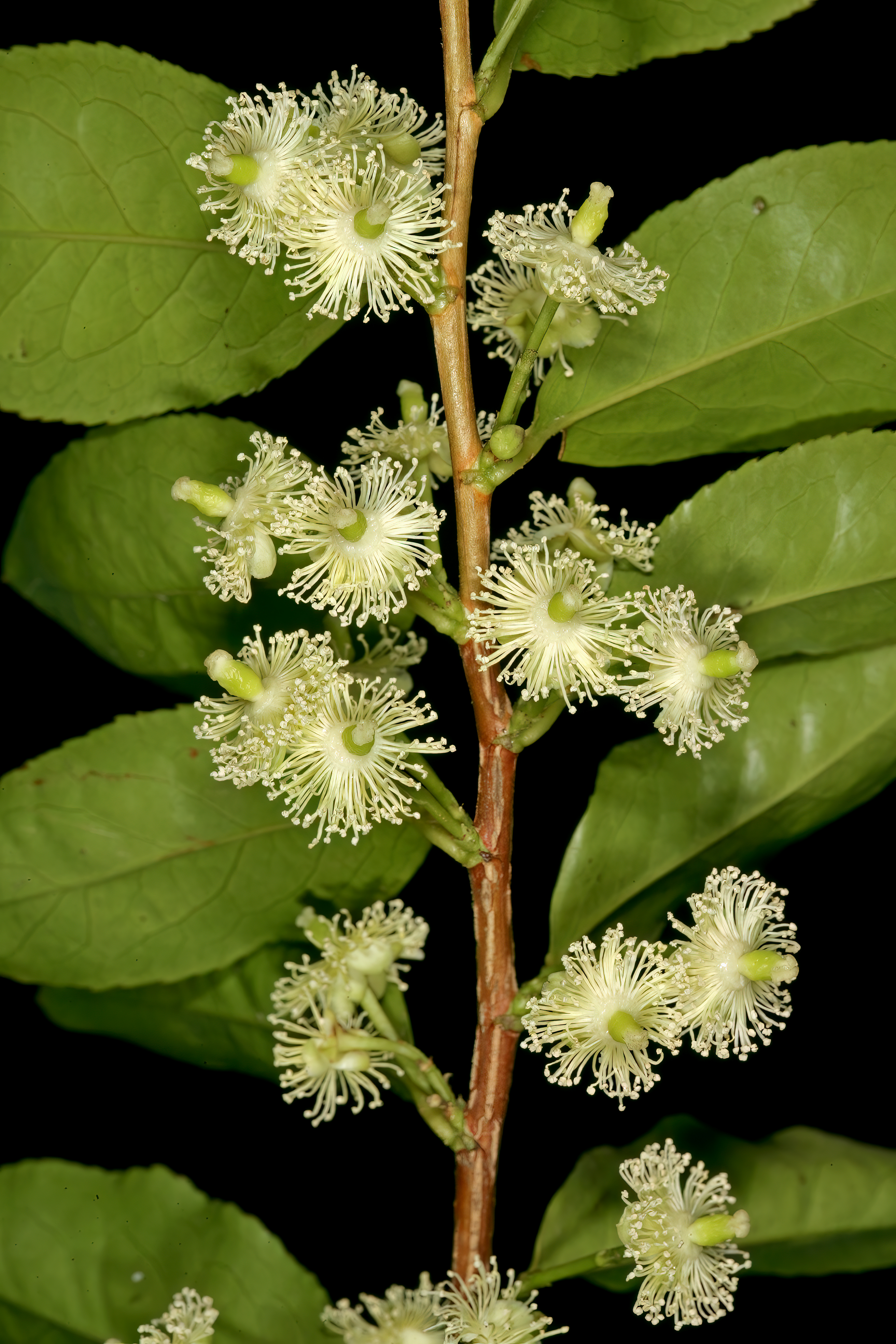
- Aphloia theiformis at the Manie van der Schijff Botanical Garden, South Africa

Scientific classification
- Kingdom: Plantae
- Clade: Tracheophytes
- Clade: Angiosperms
- Clade: Eudicots
- Clade: Rosids
- Order: Crossosomatales
- Family: Aphloiaceae; Takht.
- Genus: Aphloia; Benn.
- Species: A. theiformis

Binomial name
- Aphloia theiformis (Vahl) Benn.

Synonyms
- Lightfootia theiformis, Neumannia theiformis, Prockia theiformis; Prockia deltoides, A. deltoides; Neumannia heterophylla, Lightfootia integrifolia Vahl, Guya integrifolia, A. integrifolia; Lightfootia integrifolia Willd.; A. madagascariensis; A. mauretanica; A. sessiliflora; A. seychellensis; Neumannia myrtiflora, A. myrtiflora, A. myrtifolia

= Aphloia =

Monotypic genus of flowering plants

Aphloia is a genus of flowering plants that contains a single species, Aphloia theiformis, the sole species of the monogeneric family Aphloiaceae. It is a species of evergreen shrubs or small trees occurring in East Africa, Madagascar, the Mascarene Islands and the Seychelles.

== Taxonomy ==
The genus Aphloia was described by John Joseph Bennett in 1840 and included in Flacourtiaceae, where most authors continued to include it until Armen Takhtajan recognized its misplacement and created the new family Aphloiaceae in Violales to accommodate it. In 2003 the APG II system included Aphloiaceae in the Rosids without specifying an order. Matthews & Endress (2005) and Stevens (2006) include the family in an enlarged order Crossosomatales. The APG III system of 2009 followed suit and includes Aphloiaceae within the Crossosomatales.

== Description ==
Aphloia theiformis is an evergreen shrub or small tree reaching up to 10 m (33 ft) high. Young branches are hairless, brown in colour, have stripes along their length and wings extending from the nodes, narrowing downwards and carries alternately set leaves in two rows. The blades of the leaves are elliptic in shape, 3–8 cm (1.2–3.1 in) long, 1–3 cm (0.39–1.18 in) wide, with a pointy or rounded tip, a (broad) wedge-shaped foot and a saw-toothed edge, particularly in from below midlength to the tip. There are some ten pairs of inconspicuous, papery and hairless side veins. The leaf stalks (or petioles) are 2–4 mm (0.079–0.157 in) long. The flowers are with one, two or three together in the axils of the leaves on up to 2 cm (0.79 in) long greenish stalks (or pedicels), which also carry bracts of up to 1.8 mm (0.071 in) long that are split in three lobes. The individual flowers have an undifferentiated perianth that consists of four or five, rarely six, slightly leathery, white, later yellowish, oval to round, concave tepals of 2½-3½ mm (0.10–0.14 in) in diameter, interlocked with each other at their foot. The many stamens consist of 3 mm (0.12 in) long hairless filaments topped with round anthers of 0.7 mm (0.028 in) in diameter. The ovary consists of one carpel, is oval in shape and 3–4 mm (0.12–0.16 in) long, sits sometimes on a short stalk (a state called stipitate), and is topped by a shield-shaped stigma with a groove, set on a very short style. When ripe, the ovary develops into a fleshy white berry of about 8 mm (0.31 in) in diameter with the stigma still present, that contains about ten roundish, slightly compressed seeds of 2½–3 mm (0.10–0.14 in).
