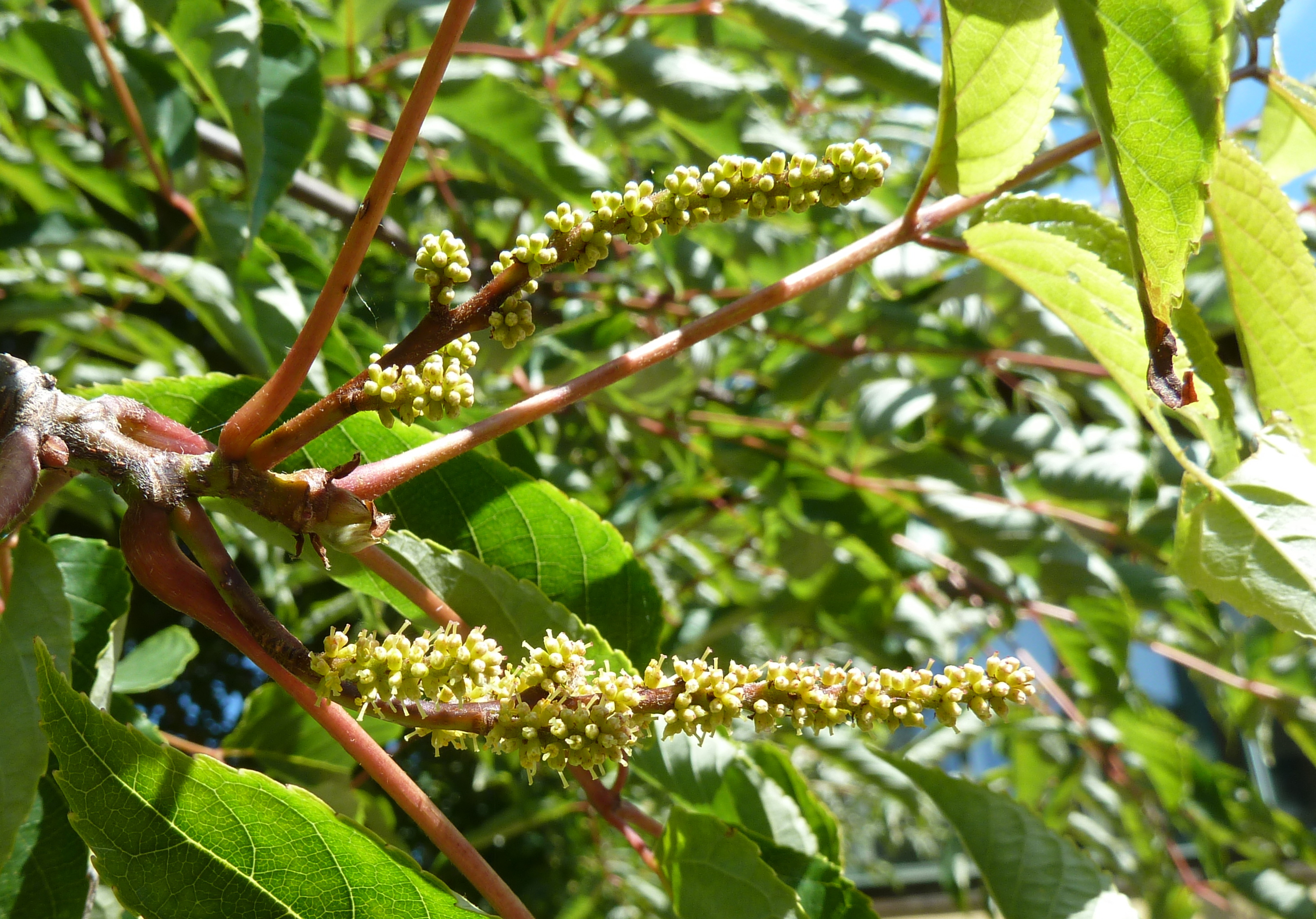
- Tapiscia sinensis

Scientific classification
- Kingdom: Plantae
- Clade: Tracheophytes
- Clade: Angiosperms
- Clade: Eudicots
- Clade: Rosids
- Order: Huerteales
- Family: Tapisciaceae; Takht.

Genera
- Tapiscia; Huertea

= Tapisciaceae =

Family of flowering plants

Tapisciaceae is a family of flowering plants. Until recently it had been abandoned by taxonomists, and it was not recognised in the APG II system of 2003. In the APG III system, however, it has been reinstated to encompass the two genera Tapiscia and Huertea, with a total of six known species.
