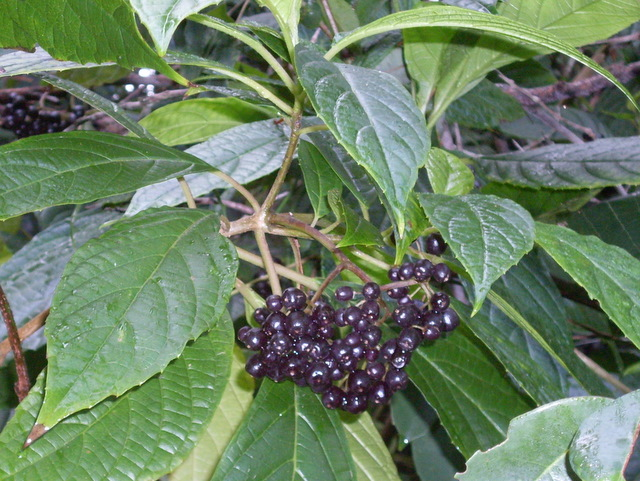
- Leaves and fruits of Abrophyllum ornans at Elvina Bay, Australia.

Scientific classification
- Kingdom: Plantae
- Clade: Tracheophytes
- Clade: Angiosperms
- Clade: Eudicots
- Clade: Asterids
- Order: Asterales
- Family: Rousseaceae
- Subfamily: Carpodetoideae
- Genus: Abrophyllum; Hook.f. ex Benth.
- Species: A. ornans

Binomial name
- Abrophyllum ornans Hook.f.

= Abrophyllum =

Genus of flowering plants

Abrophyllum (syn.: Brachynema F.Muell.) is a monotypic genus of flowering plants in the family Saxifragaceae sensu lato according to Engler, A. in Engler & Prantl and Schulze-Menz, G. K. in Melchior, 1964; placed in Subfamily Escallonioideae, Tribe Cuttsieae, it is closely related to Cuttsia. In the APG II system Abrophyllum is placed in family Rousseaceae.

The sole species is Abrophyllum ornans. Its common name is native hydrangea, but it does not have great affinity with the true hydrangea.

== Classification ==
It is also classified in Escalloniaceae (by Hutchinson 1967; Dahlgren; Thorne), Grossulariaceae (Cronquist 1988), Carpodetaceae (APG I 1998, Kubitzki 2007), Rousseaceae (APG II 2003, Shipunov 2005, Thorne & Reveal 2007 and Heywood et al. 2007), or even in its own family Abrophyllaceae Nakai (Reveal and Takhtajan 1997).

== Distribution ==
It is native to Australia (New South Wales and Queensland). Its habitat is warm-temperate and subtropical rainforest, especially along smaller watercourses or in gullies on poorer soils. The natural range of distribution is from the Illawarra region of New South Wales to the McIlwraith Range in far north Queensland.

== Description ==
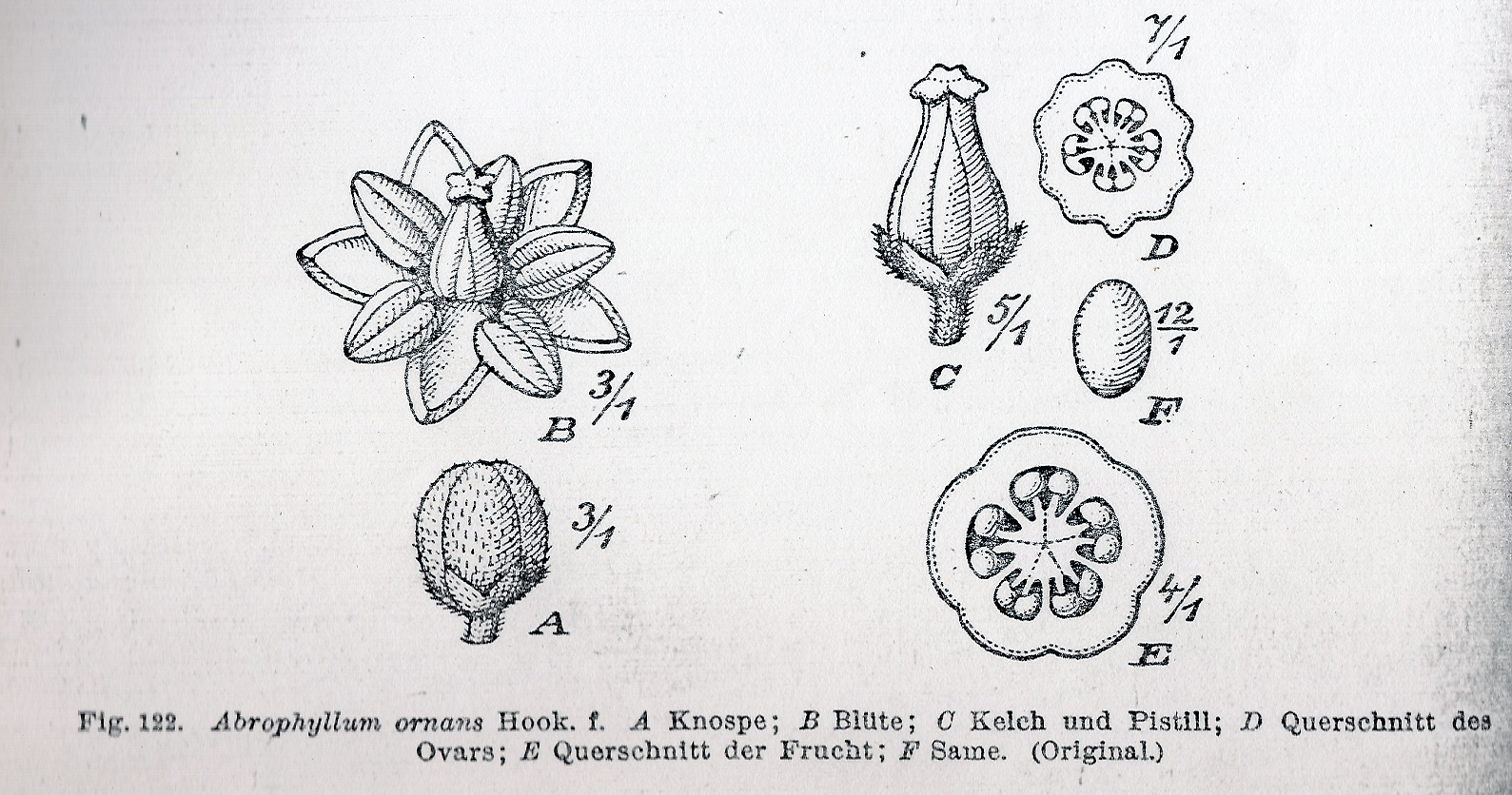
Abrophyllum ornans in Engler & Prantl

Shrubs or small trees to 8 m (26 ft) high; leaves simple, mostly 10–20 cm (3.9–7.9 in) long, 3–8 cm (1.2–3.1 in) wide, alternate, large, lanceolate, long-acuminate, subserrate; without stipules, petiole 20–40 mm (0.8–1.6 in) long. Flowers in terminal or axillary cymes, yellowish. Calyx is short (c. 2 mm (0.1 in) long.), tubular, lobes usually 5 or sometimes 6, deciduous. Petals 4–5 mm (0.2–0.2 in) long, usually 5 or sometimes 6, valvate, spreading, deciduous. Stamens usually 5 or sometimes 6, inserted on the margin of the inconspicuous nectary disk; anthers broad oblong; filaments very short. Gynoecium of 5 carpels, receptacle patelliform. Ovary superior, 5-locular, with numerous axile ovules, stigma sessile, 5-lobed. Fruit are oblong, black berries about 8–12 mm (0.3–0.5 in) long and 5–7 mm (0.20–0.28 in) wide, crowned by the stigma, many-seeded; seeds small, subglobose, testa deeply latticed; embryo very small; endosperm fleshy and oily.

== Uses ==
Sometimes (locally) cultivated for its ornamental foliage and fruits.

== Bibliography ==
- Bentham, G. & Hooker, J. D. (1862-1867). Genera Plantarum.Volume I, p. 647. Reeve, London
- Engler, A. (1930). Saxifragaceae. In Engler, A. & Prantl, K.:Die Natürlichen Pflanzenfamilien, 18a, 2nd Edition, p. 213. (In German)
- Schulze-Menz, G.K. (1964). Rosales. In H. Melchior (Editor). A. Engler's: Syllabus der Pflanzenfamilien, Volume II, 12th edition. Berlin: Gebrüder Borntraeger, pp. 193–242.
- Hutchinson, J.(1967):The Genera of Flowering Plants, Volume II, p. 30.
- Gustafsson, M. H. G. & Bremer, K. (1997). The circumscription and systematic position of Carpodetaceae.Australian Systematic Botany 10(6): 855–862. [It is proposed that the family Carpodetaceae be expanded to encompass Abrophyllum and Cuttsia.]
- Takhtajan, A. (1997). Diversity and classification of flowering plants, 370–373. ISBN 0-231-10098-1
- Hils, M. H. (1985). Comparative anatomy and systematics of twelve woody Australasian genera of the Saxifragaceae. Matthew Hils: Florida xvi, 239, [33]p. - illus. Icones, Anatomy and morphology. Thesis: University of Florida: PhD [including Abrophyllum]
