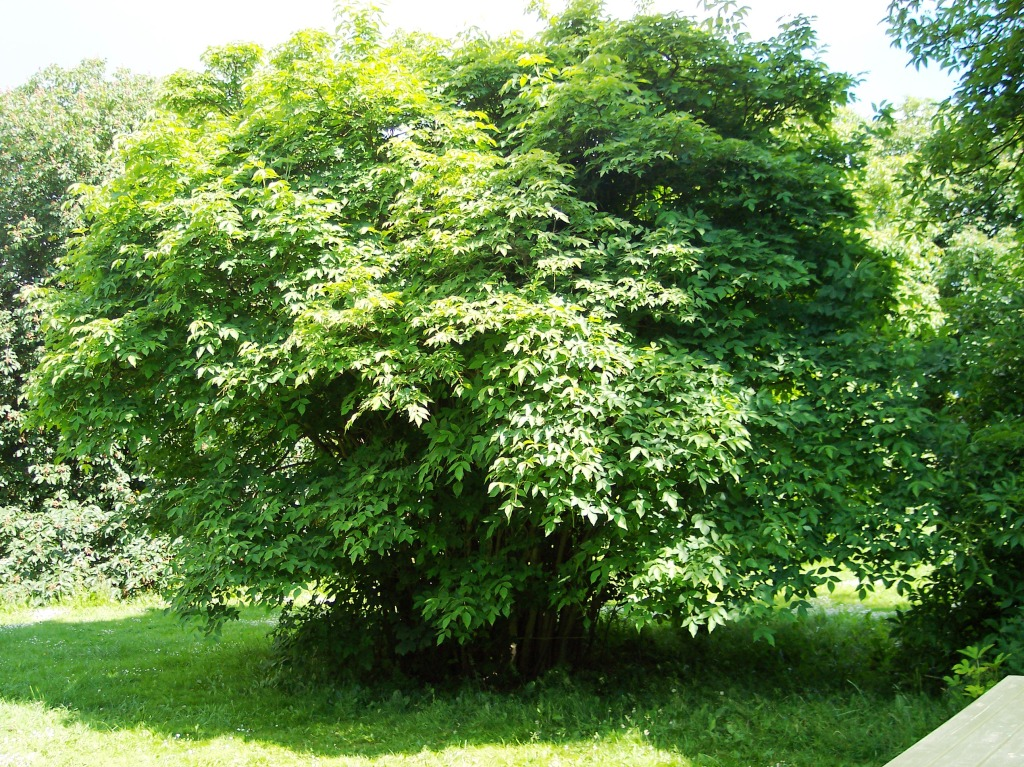
- Staphylea colchica

Scientific classification
- Kingdom: Plantae
- Clade: Tracheophytes
- Clade: Angiosperms
- Clade: Eudicots
- Clade: Rosids
- Order: Crossosomatales
- Family: Staphyleaceae; Martinov

= Staphyleaceae =

Family of flowering plants

Staphyleaceae is a small family of flowering plants in the order Crossosomatales, native to Europe, temperate and tropical Asia and the Americas. The largest genus Staphylea, which gives the family its name, contains the "bladdernut" trees. The family includes three genera with more than 40 known species.

== Genera ==
Plants of the World Online currently includes:

- Dalrympelea Roxb.
- Staphylea L. (includes Euscaphis)
- Turpinia Vent.

=== Excluded genera ===
These two genera, formerly placed here, are now included in the Tapisciaceae (Huerteales) as of the APG III system (2009).

- Huertea
- Tapiscia
