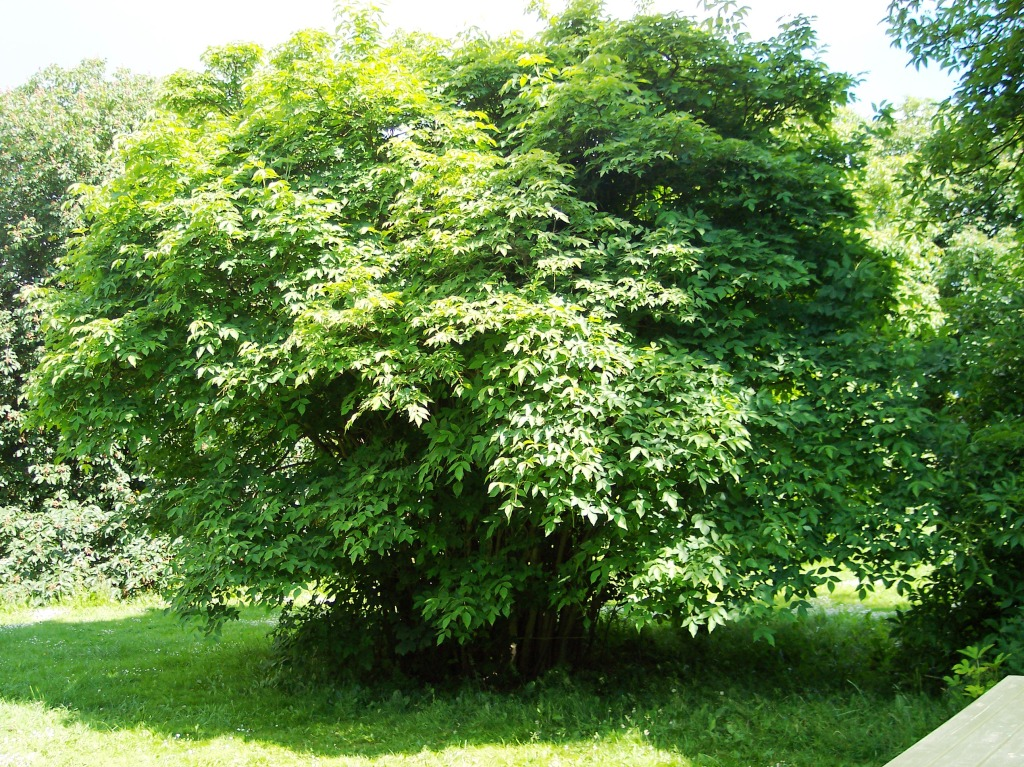
- Staphylea colchica

Scientific classification
- Kingdom: Plantae
- Clade: Tracheophytes
- Clade: Angiosperms
- Clade: Eudicots
- Clade: Rosids
- Clade: Malvids
- Order: Crossosomatales; Takht. ex Reveal

Families
- Aphloiaceae; Crossosomataceae; Geissolomataceae; Guamatelaceae; Stachyuraceae; Staphyleaceae; Strasburgeriaceae

= Crossosomatales =

Order of flowering plants

The Crossosomatales are an order, first recognized as such by APG II. They are flowering plants included within the Rosid eudicots.

== Description ==
Species assigned to the Crossosomatales have in common flowers that are positioned solitarily, with the base of the calyx, corolla, and stamens fused into a tube-shaped floral cup, sepals overlapping, the outermost smaller than the inner. Insides of the casings of pollen grains have horizontally extended thin regions (or endo-apertures). The gynoecium is placed on a short stalk, papillae on the stigma consist of two or more cells, ovary locules taper upwards, and the protective cell layer (or integument) surrounding the ovule leaves a zigzag opening (or micropyle). Some cell clusters have bundles of long yellow crystals, mucilage cells are present, and seeds have a smooth, woody coating.

== Taxonomy ==
The relationships between orders within the Malvid clade, according to the APG system, is represented by the following tree.

- Malvids
  - - Geraniales
    - Myrtales
  - - Crossosomatales
    - - Picramniales
      - - Sapindales
        - - Huerteales
          - - Brassicales
            - Malvales

Within the Crossosomatales, the APG III system of 2009 recognises families represented in the following tree.

- Crossosomatales
  - - - - Strasburgeriaceae
        - Geissolomataceae
    - Aphloiaceae
  - - Staphyleaceae
    - - Guamatelaceae
      - - Stachyuraceae
        - Crossosomataceae
