= Fernkloof Nature Reserve =

Nature reserve in South Africa

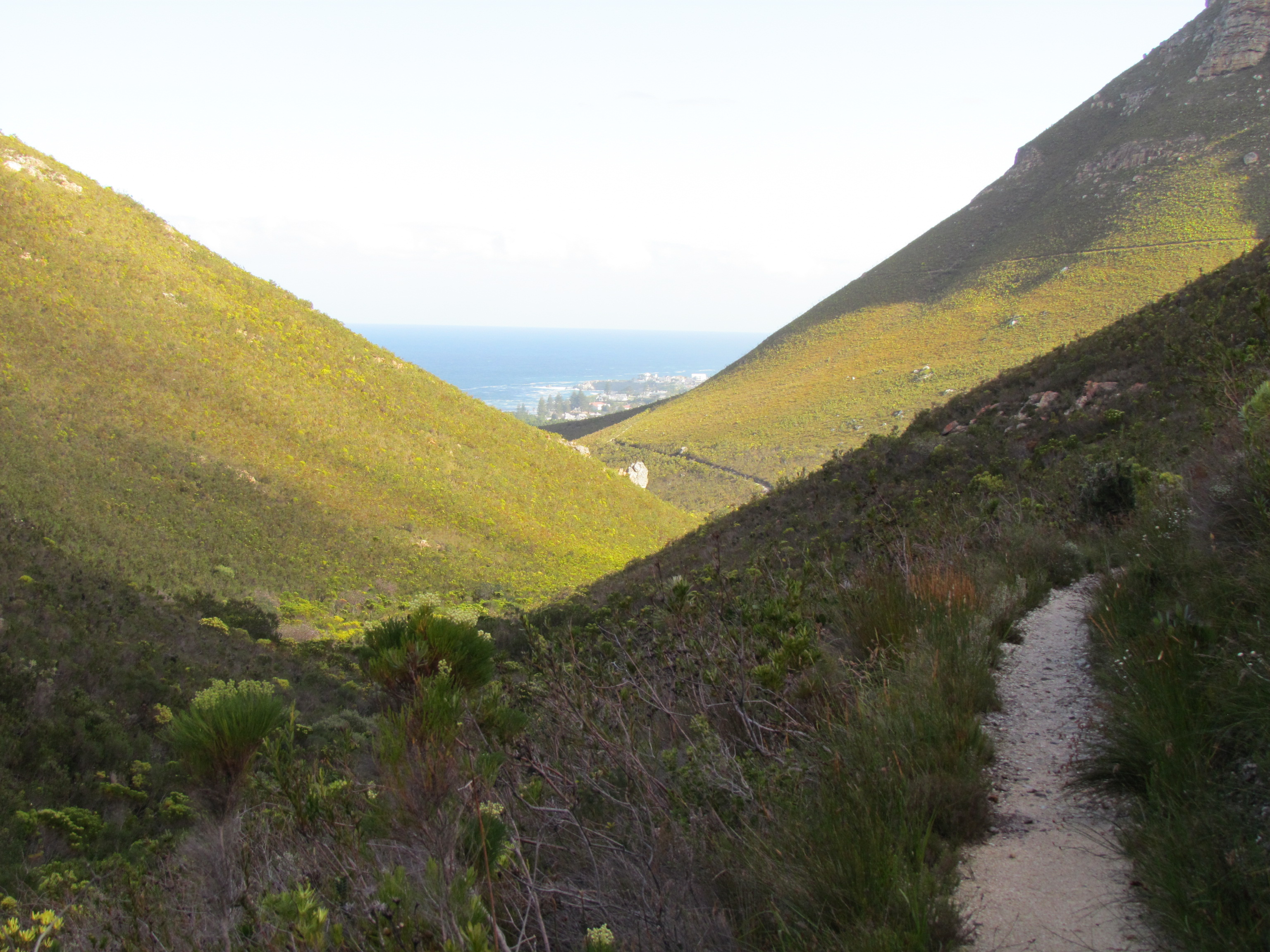
- Fernkloof in August

- Location within Western Cape
- Location: Hermanus
- Coordinates: 34°23′14.0″S 19°16′38.2″E
- Area: 1,800 ha (4,400 acres)
- Established: 1957

Fernkloof Nature Reserve is a nature reserve in the Kleinrivier Mountains above Hermanus, Western Cape Province, South Africa. It is 1,800 hectares (6.9 mi^{2}) in area and its altitude ranges from sea level to 842 metres (2,762 ft). The reserve harbours over 1300 species of plant.

Here is a complete list, many with photos, of all plant species found in Fernkloof Nature Reserve.

The Fernkloof Nature Reserve comprises 0.002% of the area of the Cape Floral Kingdom but contains 14% of its plant species in just 18 square kilometres. More info here

== Flora Gallery ==
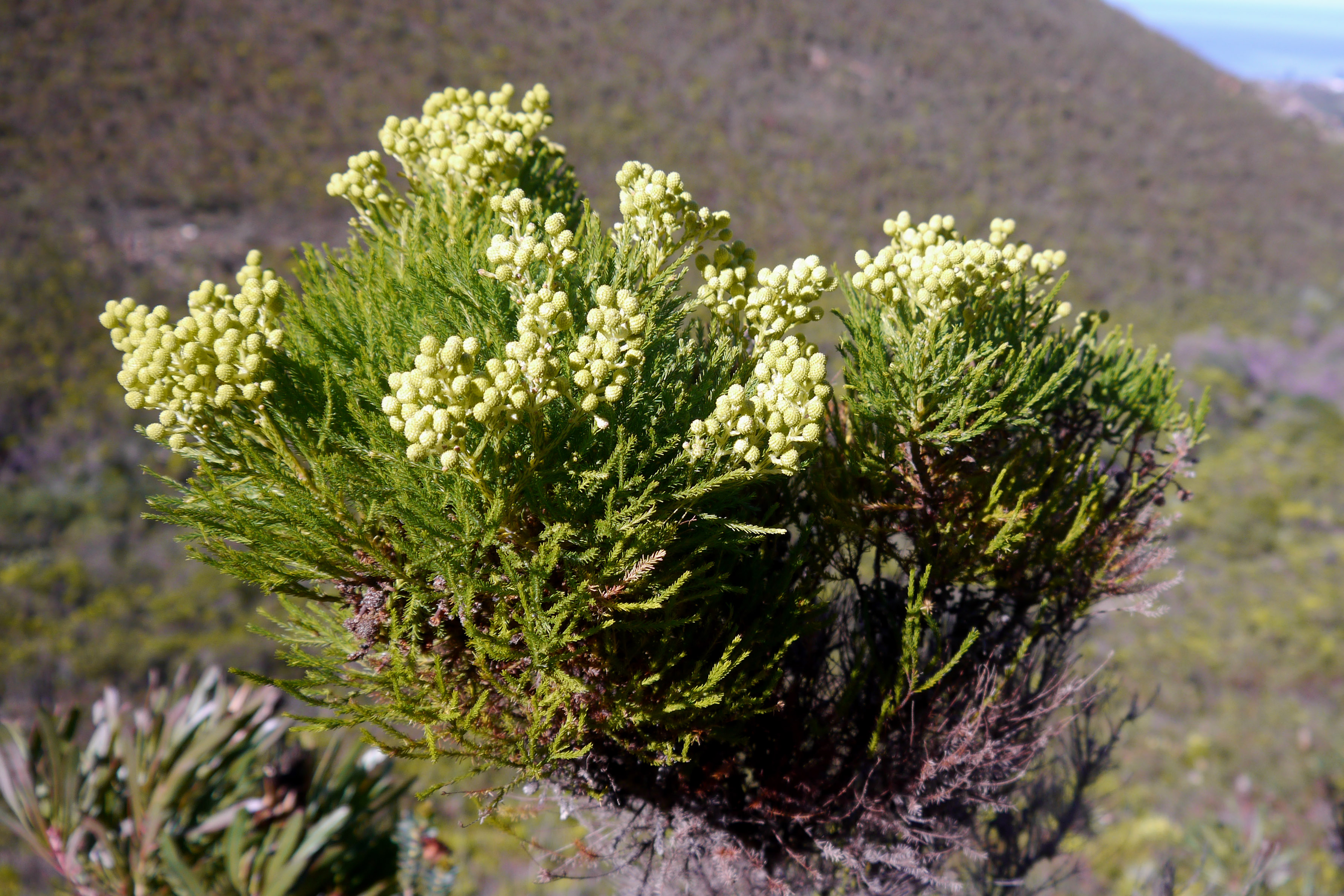
Berzelia lanuginosa

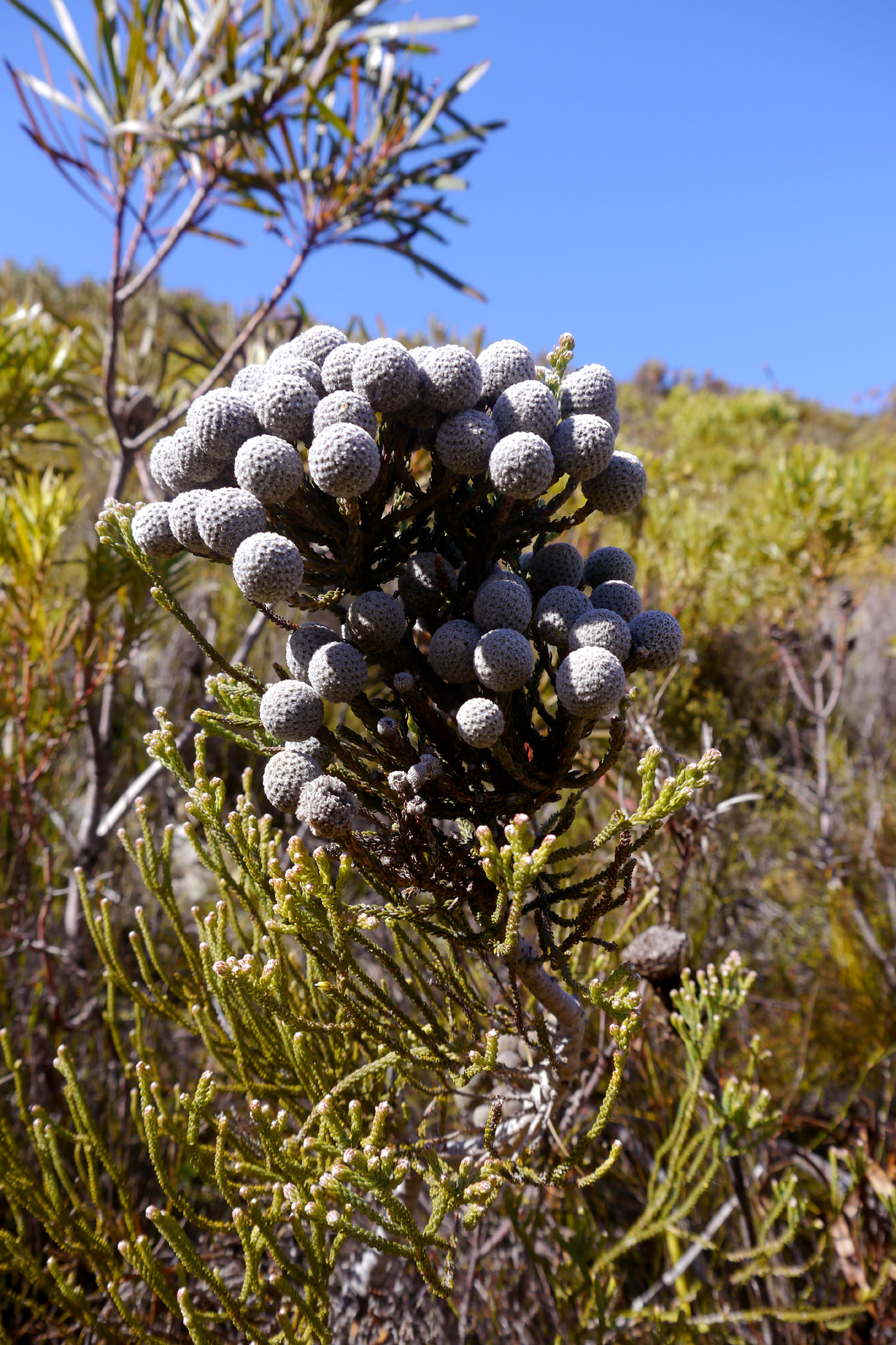
Brunia nodiflora

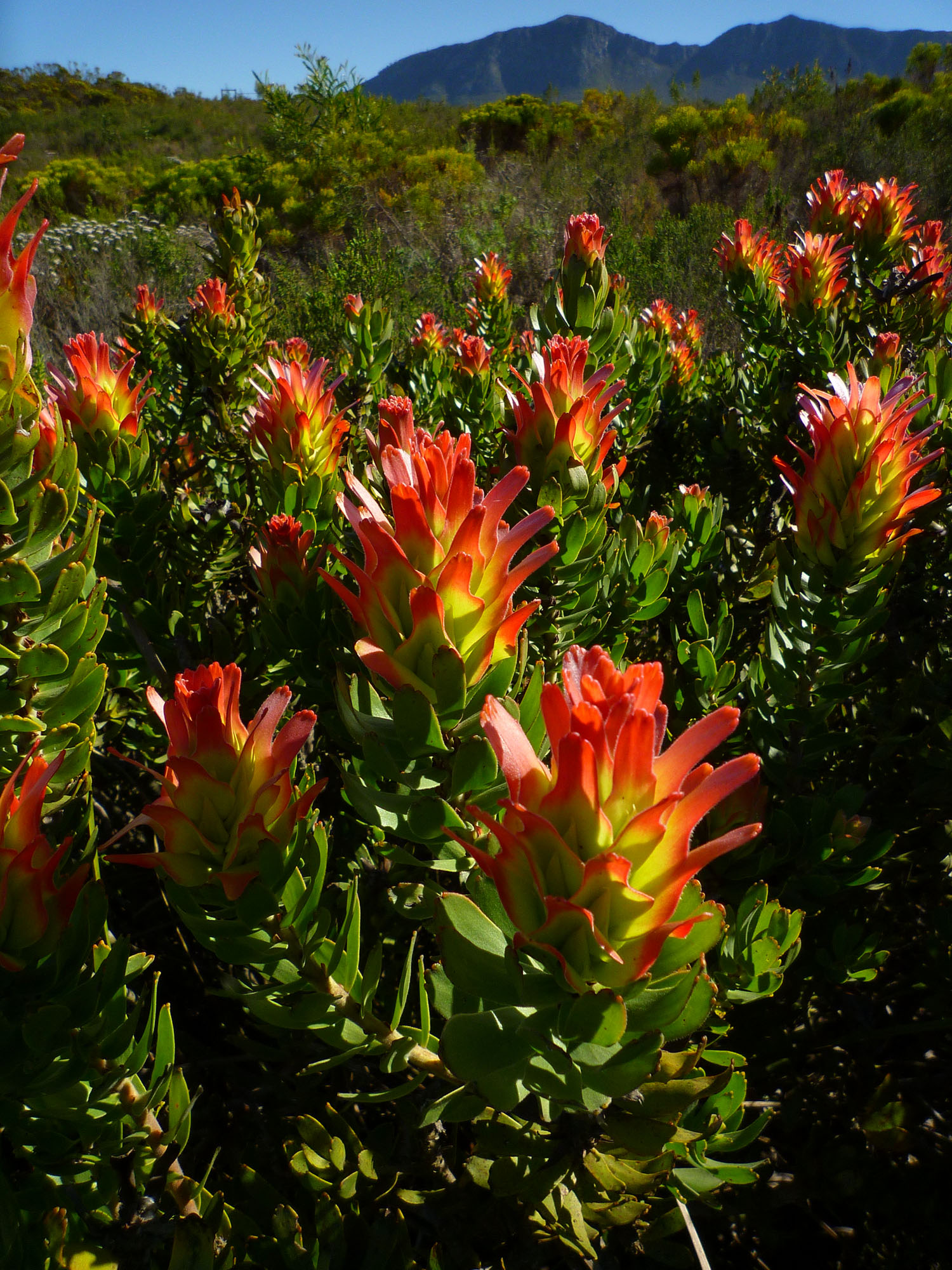
Mimetes cucullatus

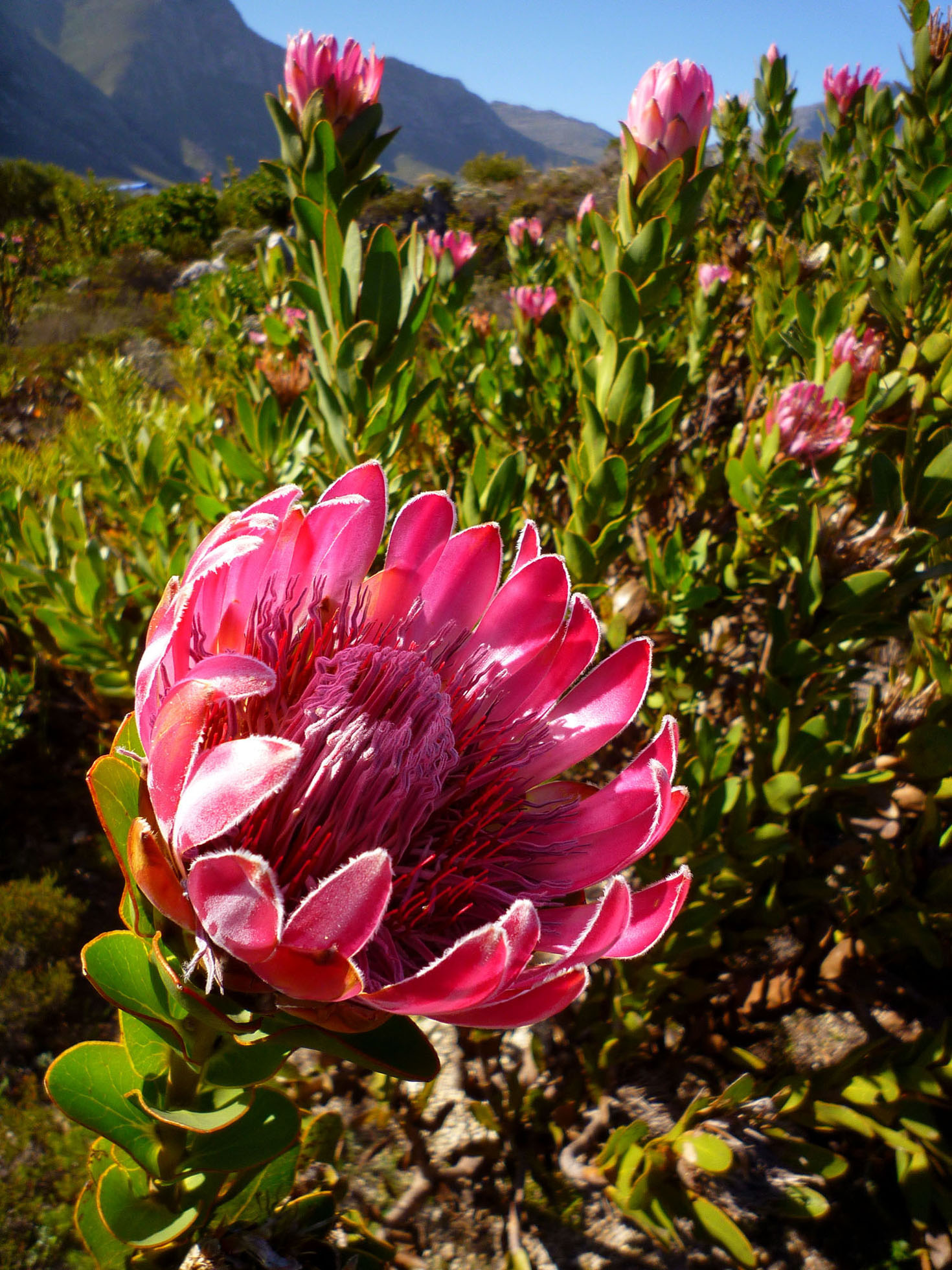
Protea compacta

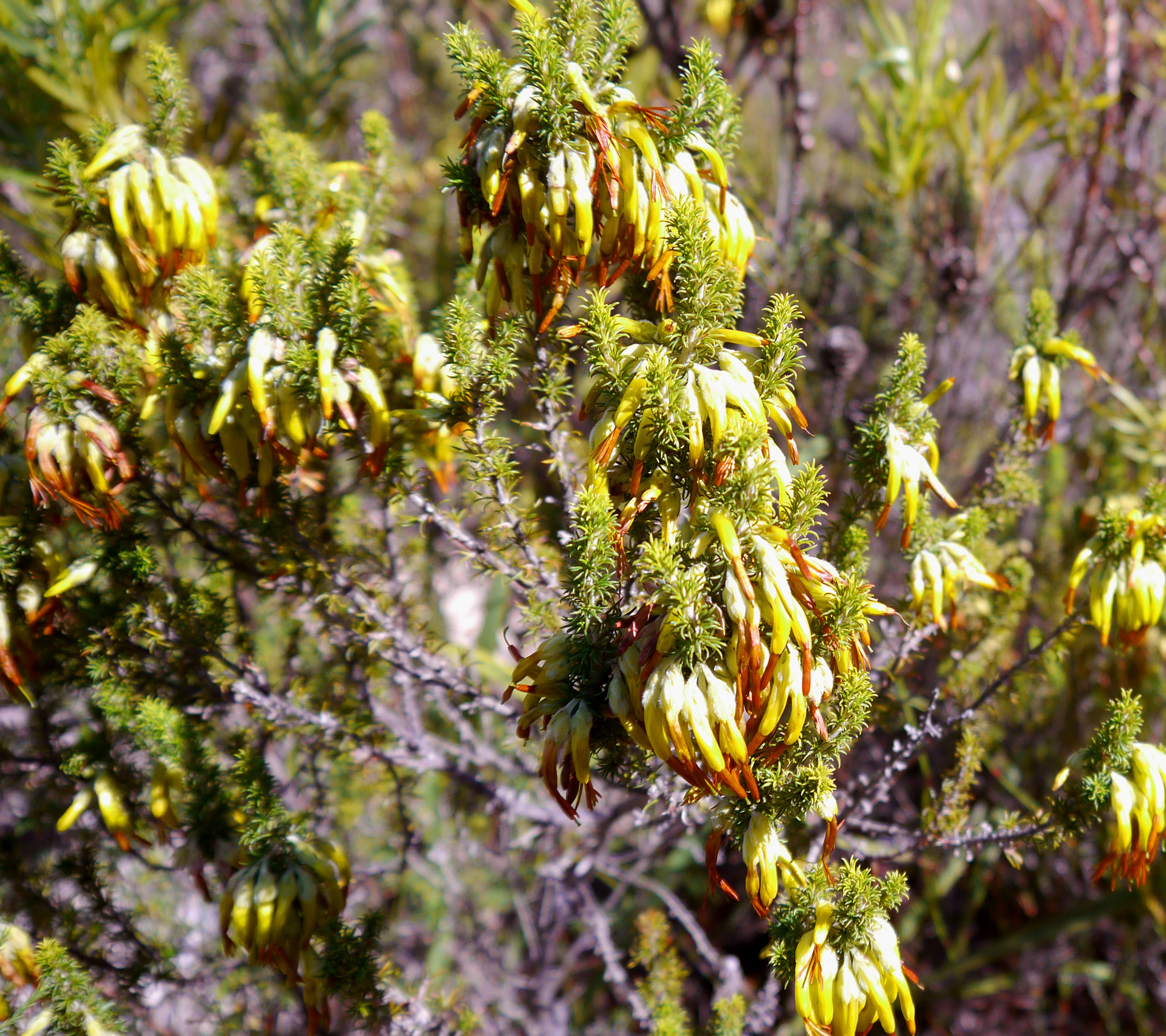
Erica coccinea

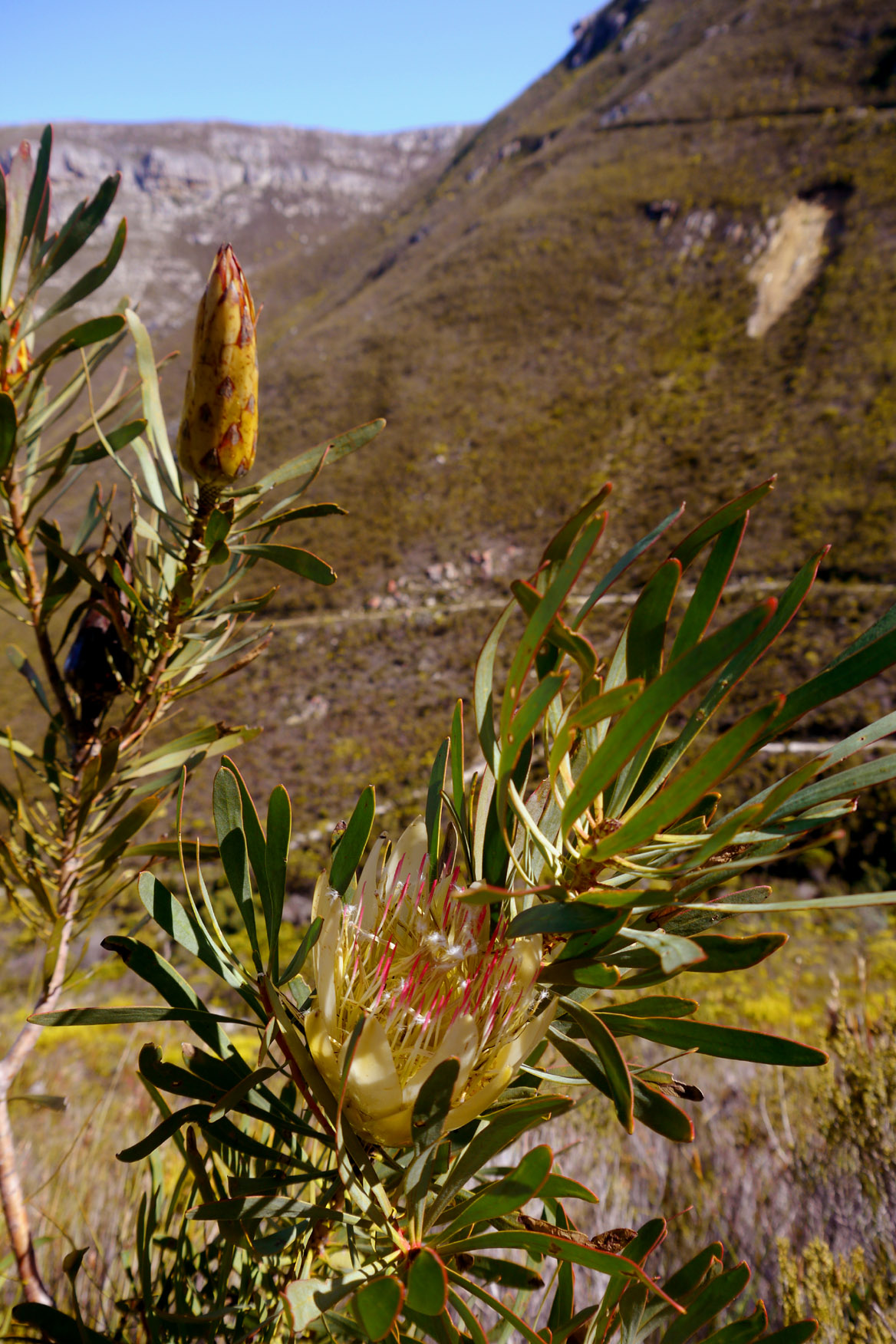
Protea repens

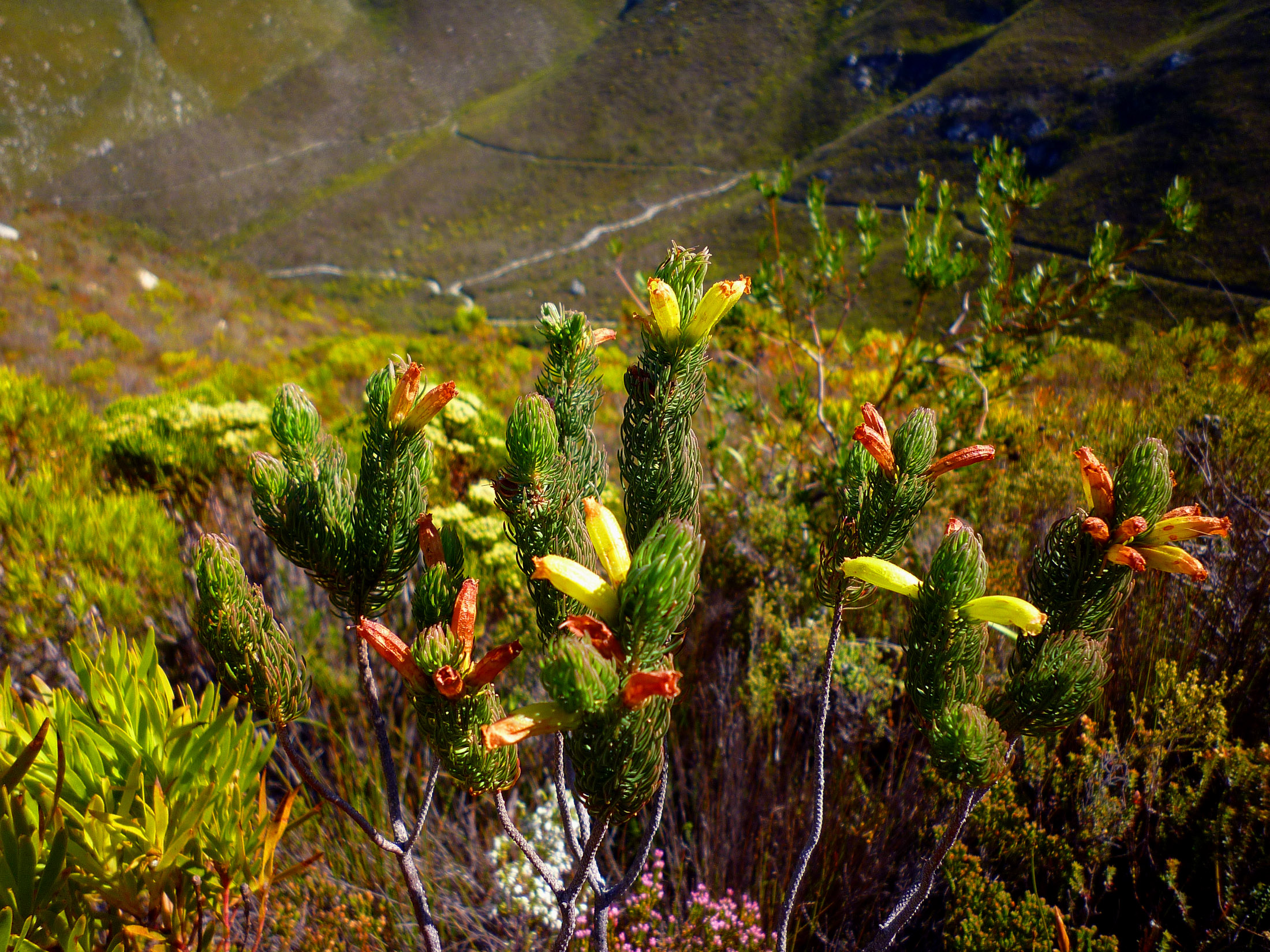
Erica viscaria

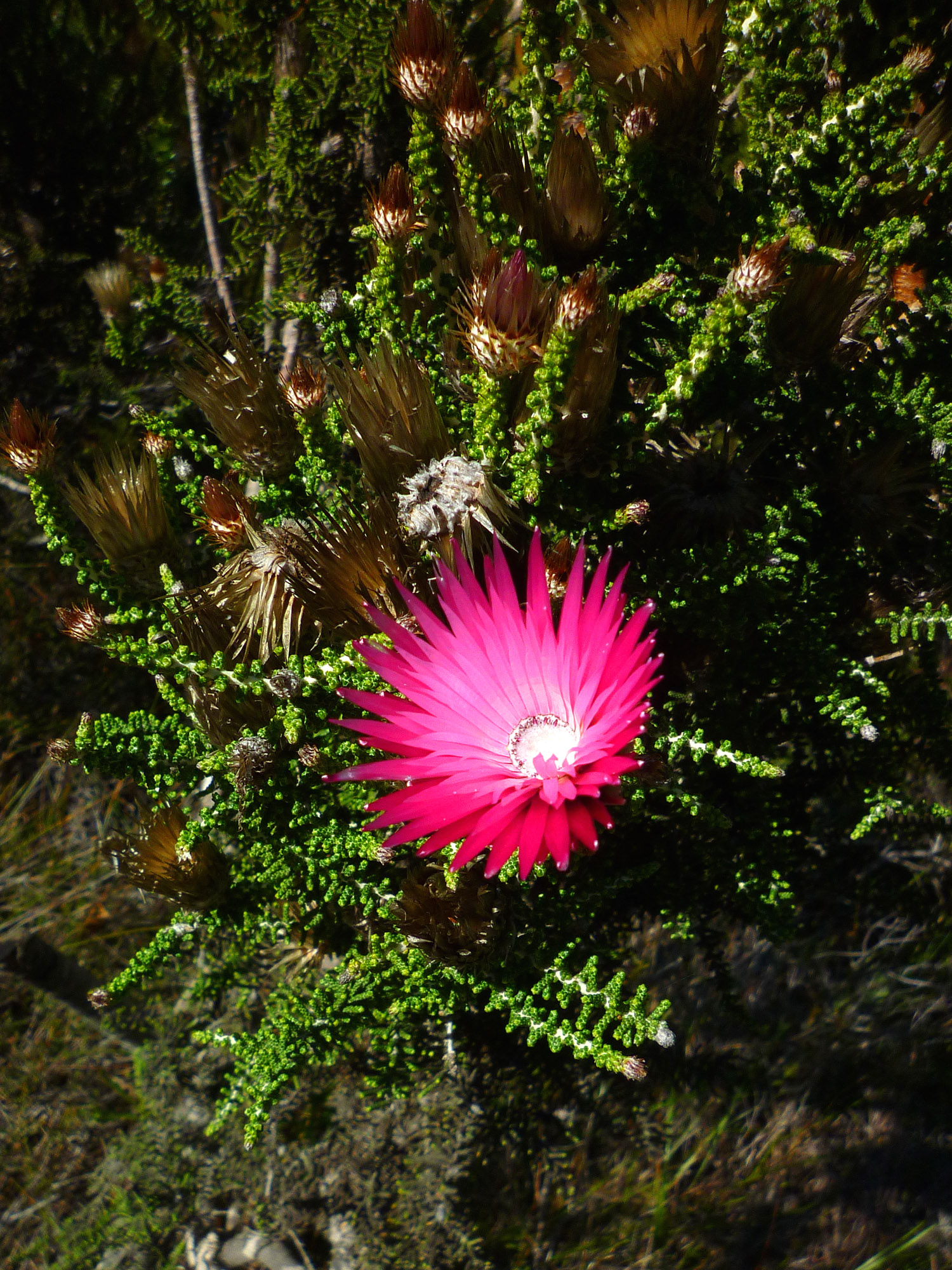
Phaenocoma prolifera

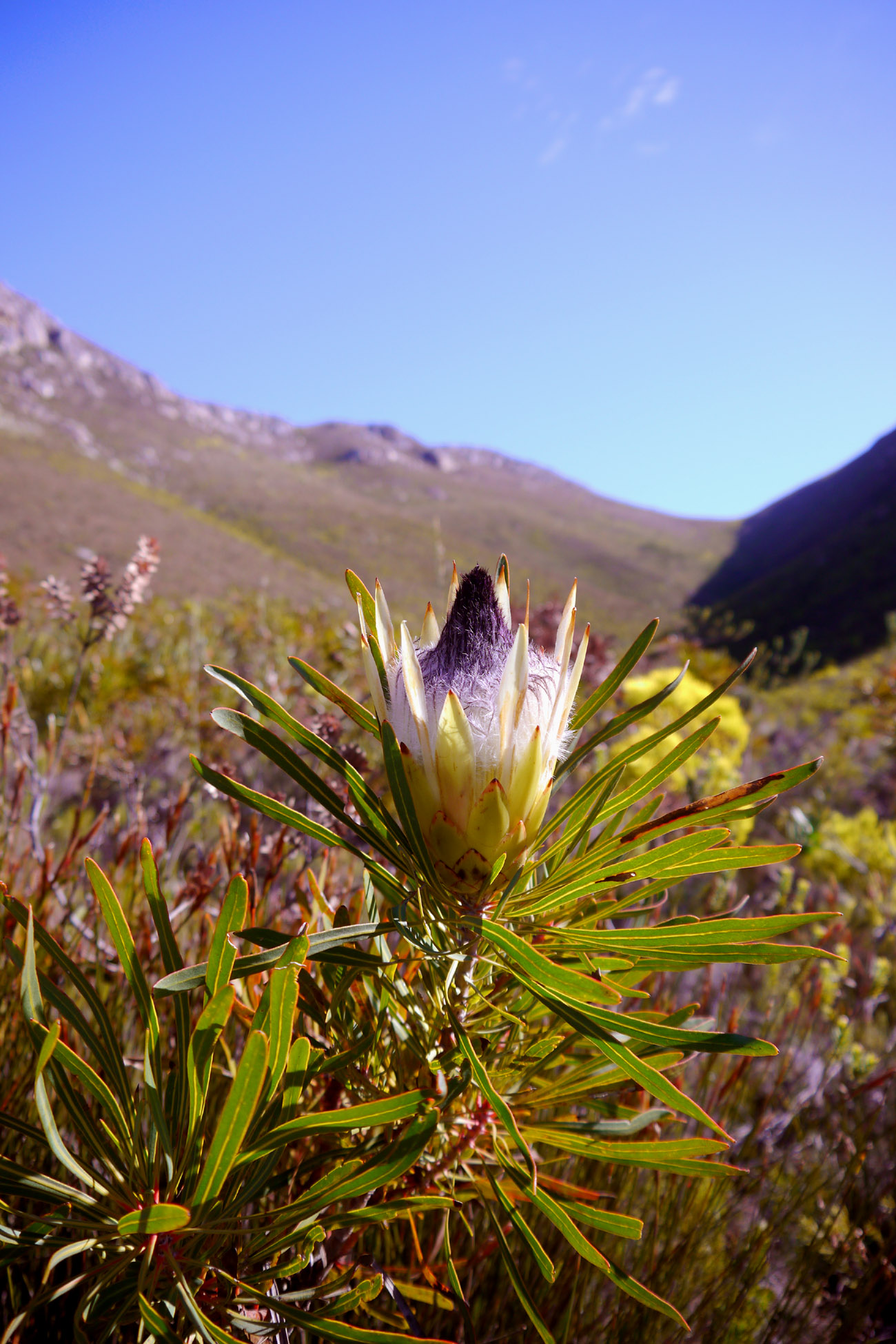
Protea longifolia

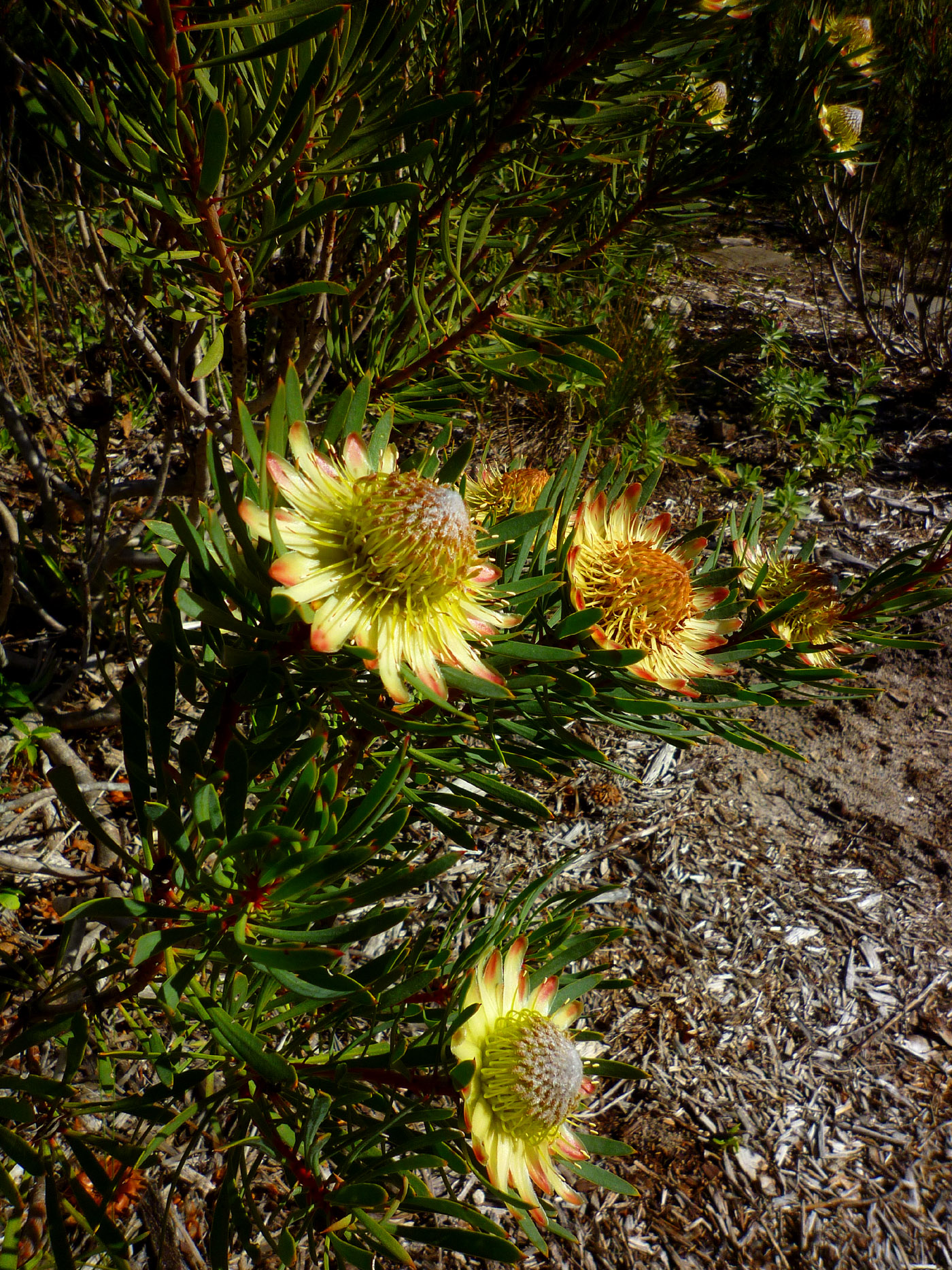
Protea scolymocephala

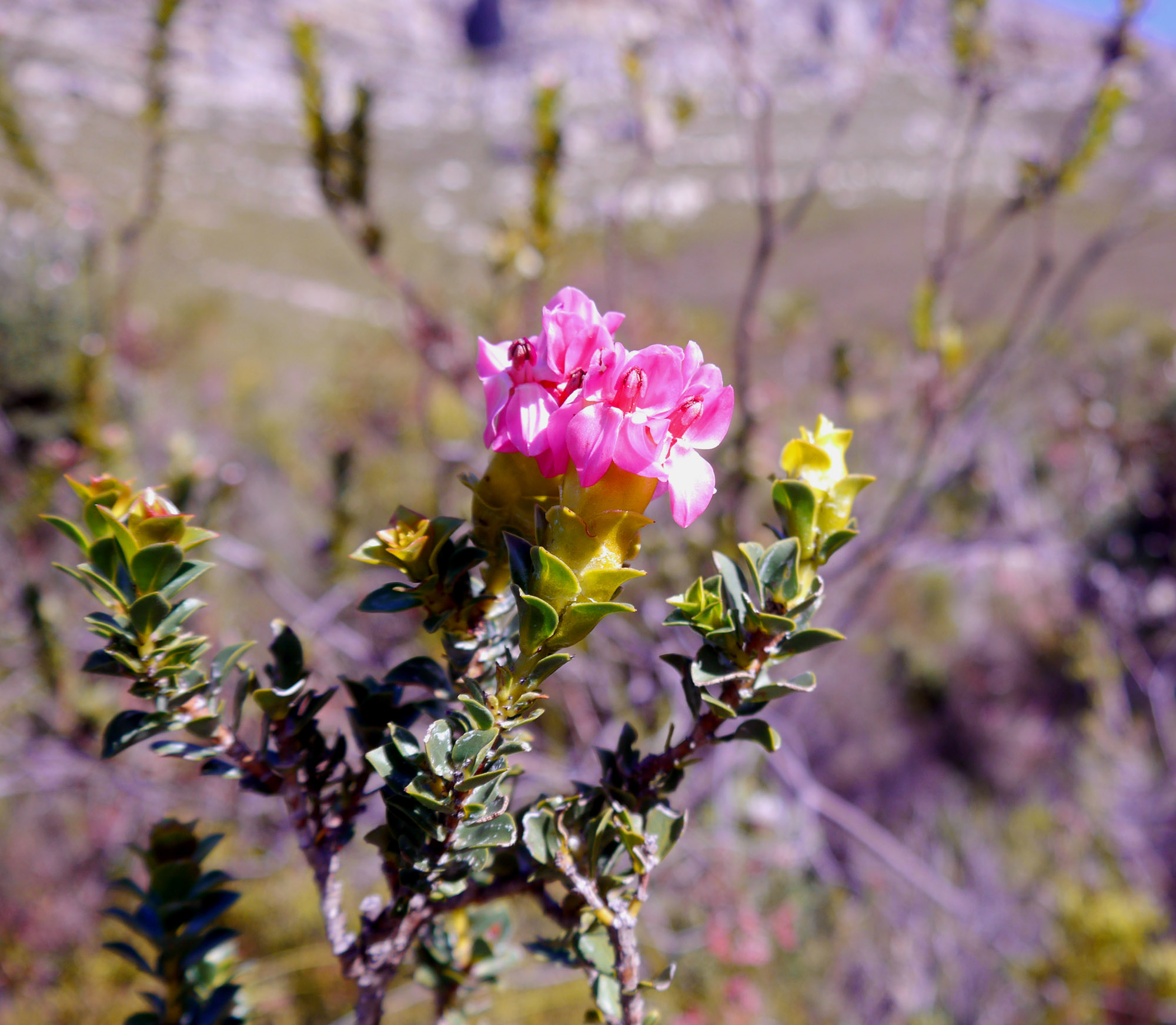
Saltera sarcocolla

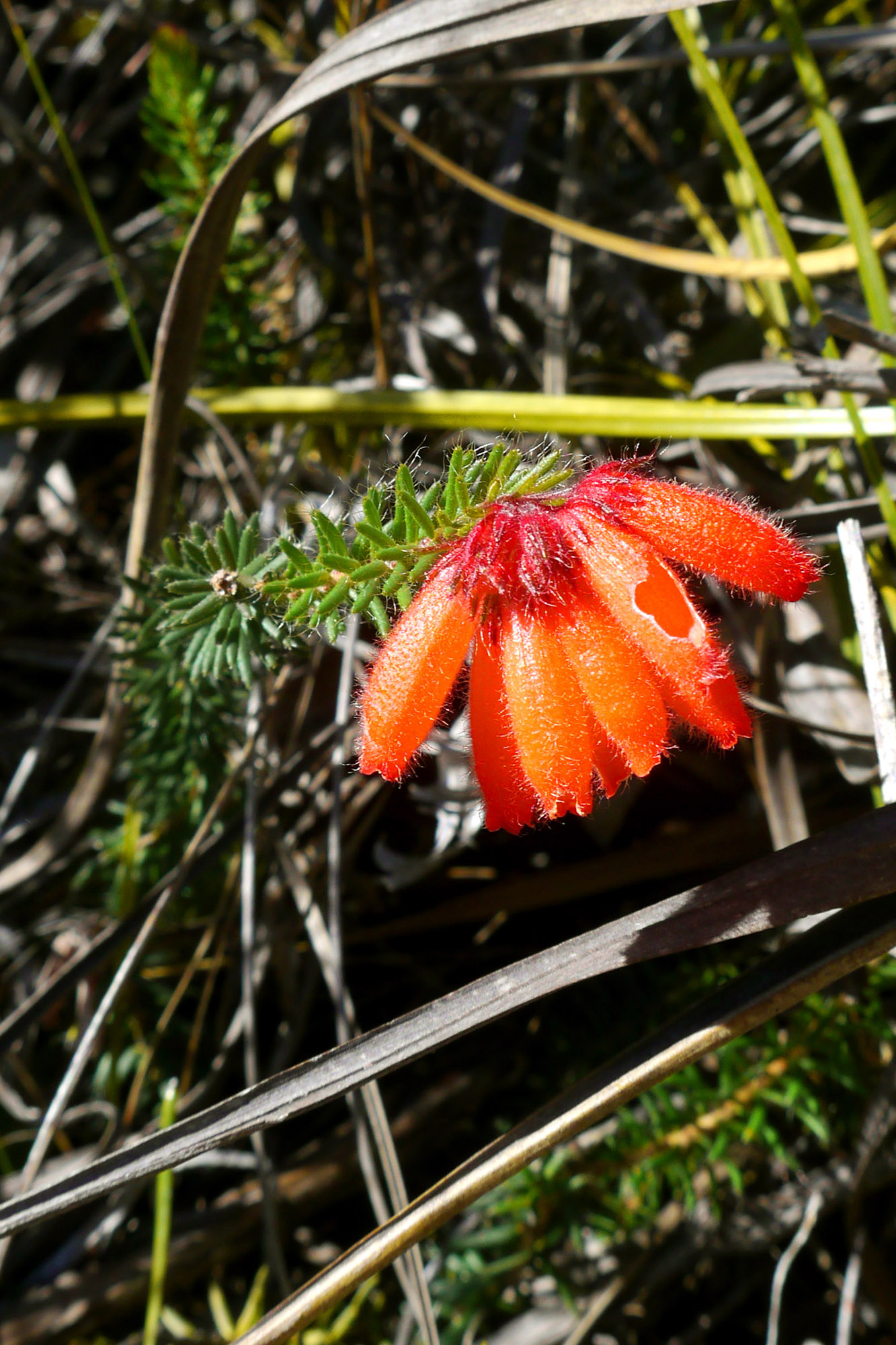
Erica cerinthoides

== Fauna Gallery ==
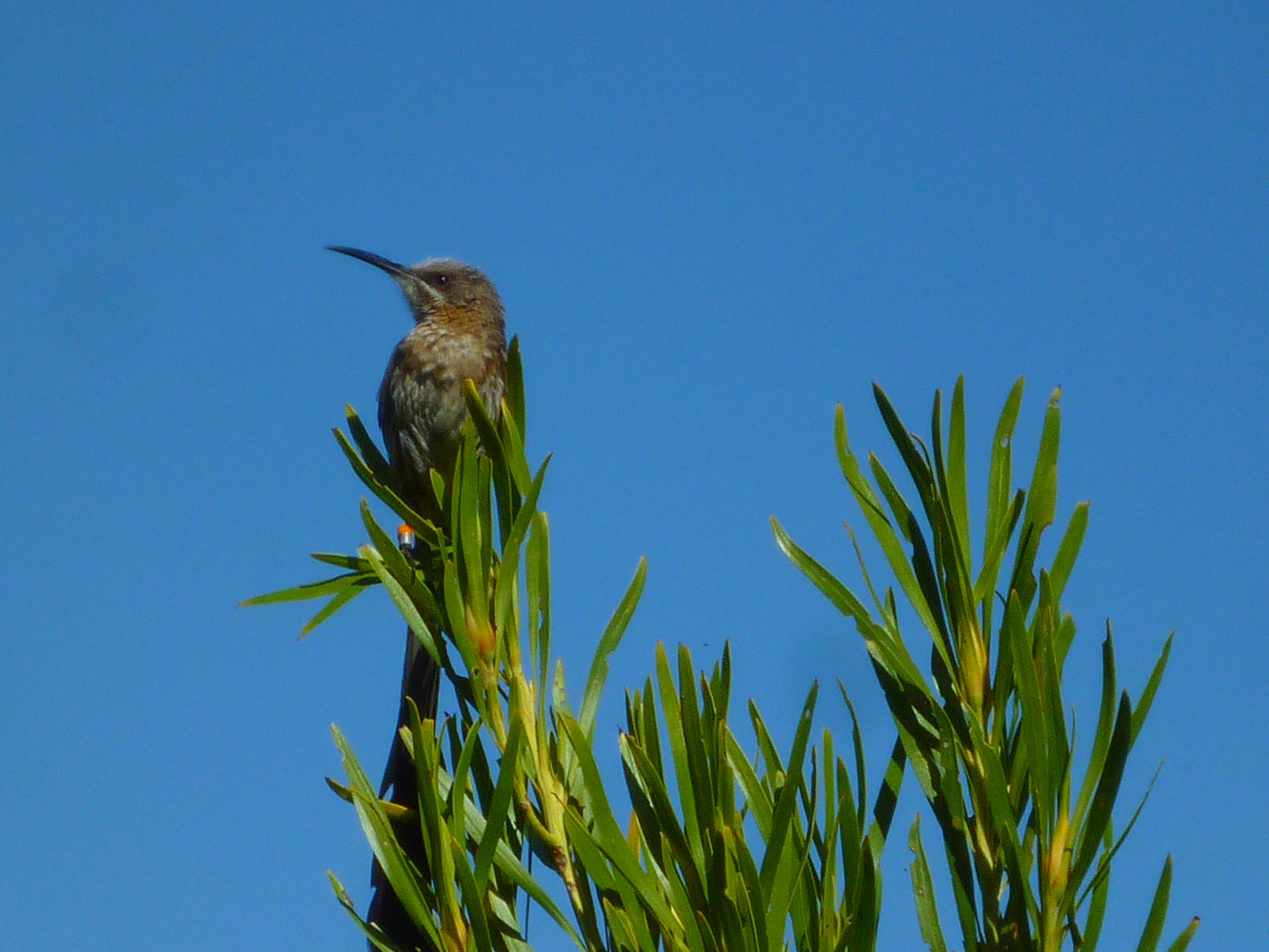
Promerops cafer

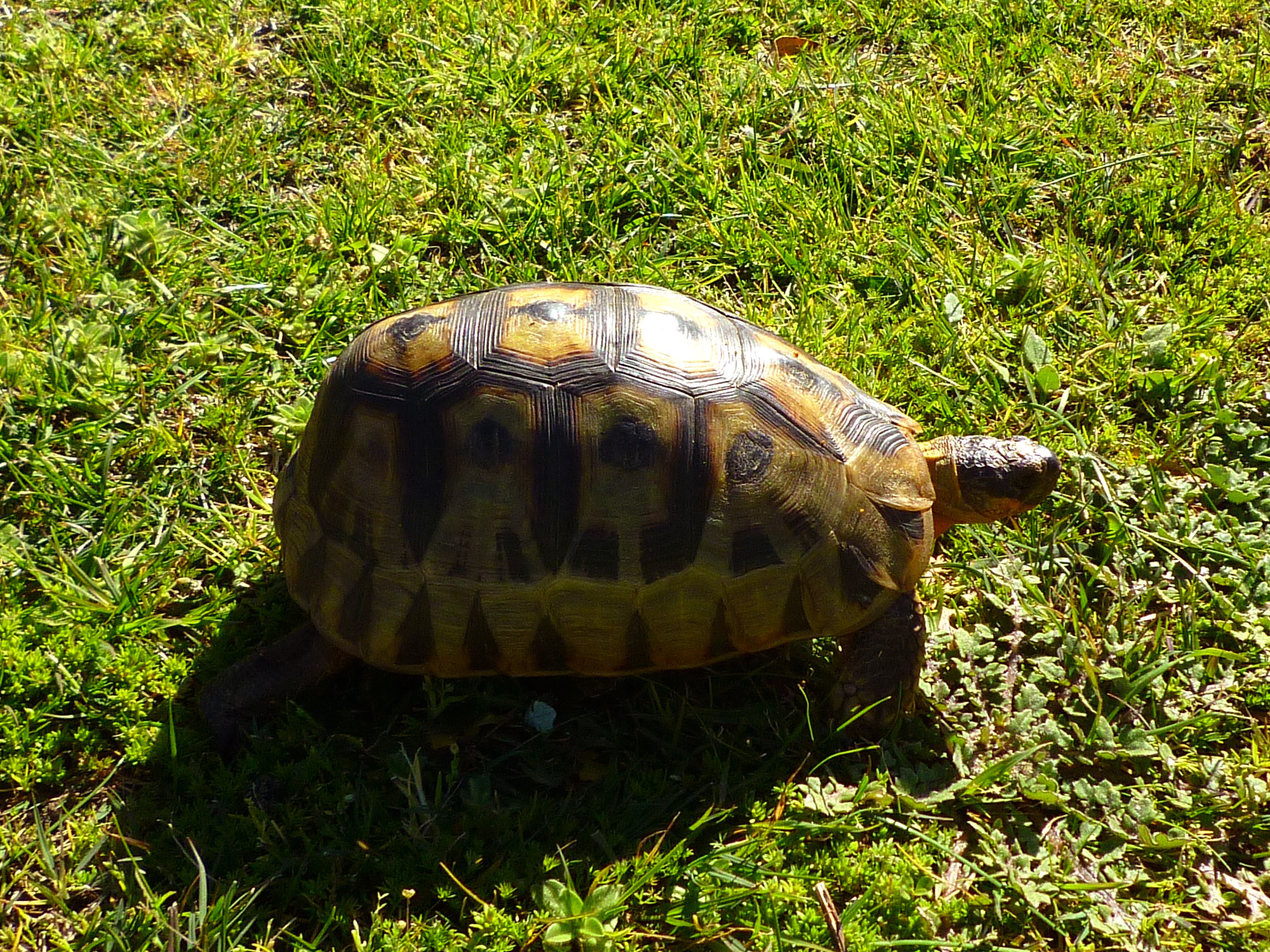
Chersina angulata
