= Penaea mucronata =

- Close-up of flowers
- Habit

Scientific classification
- Kingdom: Plantae
- Clade: Tracheophytes
- Clade: Angiosperms
- Clade: Eudicots
- Clade: Rosids
- Order: Myrtales
- Family: Penaeaceae
- Genus: Penaea
- Species: P. mucronata

Binomial name
- Penaea mucronata L.

Synonyms
- Penaea affinis Endl.; Penaea bolusii Gand.; Penaea dregei Endl.; Penaea macrosiphon Gand.

Species of plant

Penaea mucronata, called noughts-and-crosses or yellow brickleaf, is a widespread species of flowering plant in the family Penaeaceae. It is native to the southwestern Cape Provinces of South Africa. A tuberous subshrub 30 to 80 cm (12 to 31 in) tall, it is typically found growing on rocky or sandy sandstone slopes, and is fire-adapted.
