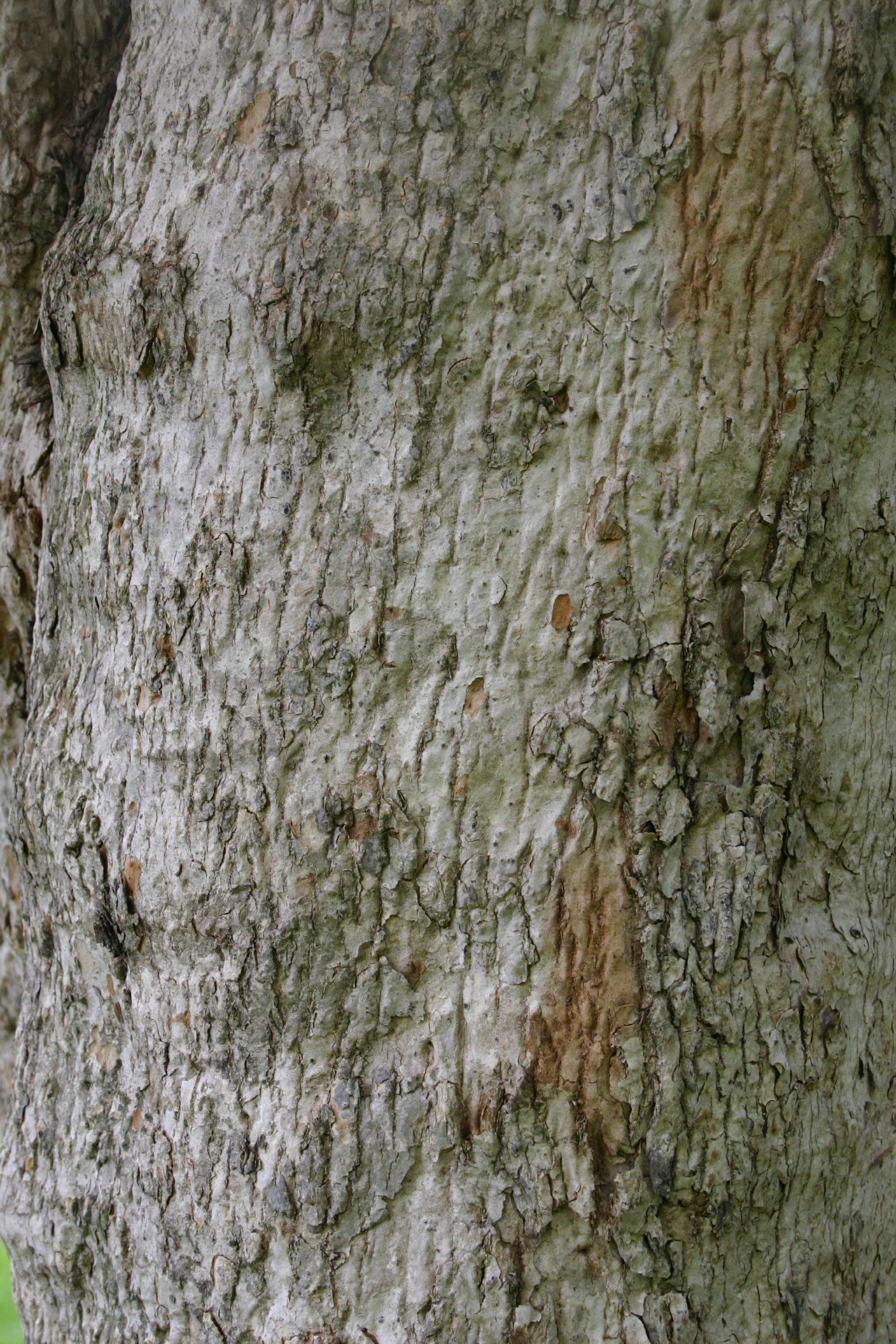
- Olinia emarginata bark

Conservation status
- Least Concern (IUCN 3.1)

Scientific classification
- Kingdom: Plantae
- Clade: Tracheophytes
- Clade: Angiosperms
- Clade: Eudicots
- Clade: Rosids
- Order: Myrtales
- Family: Penaeaceae
- Genus: Olinia
- Species: O. emarginata

Binomial name
- Olinia emarginata Burtt Davy

= Olinia emarginata =

Species of tree

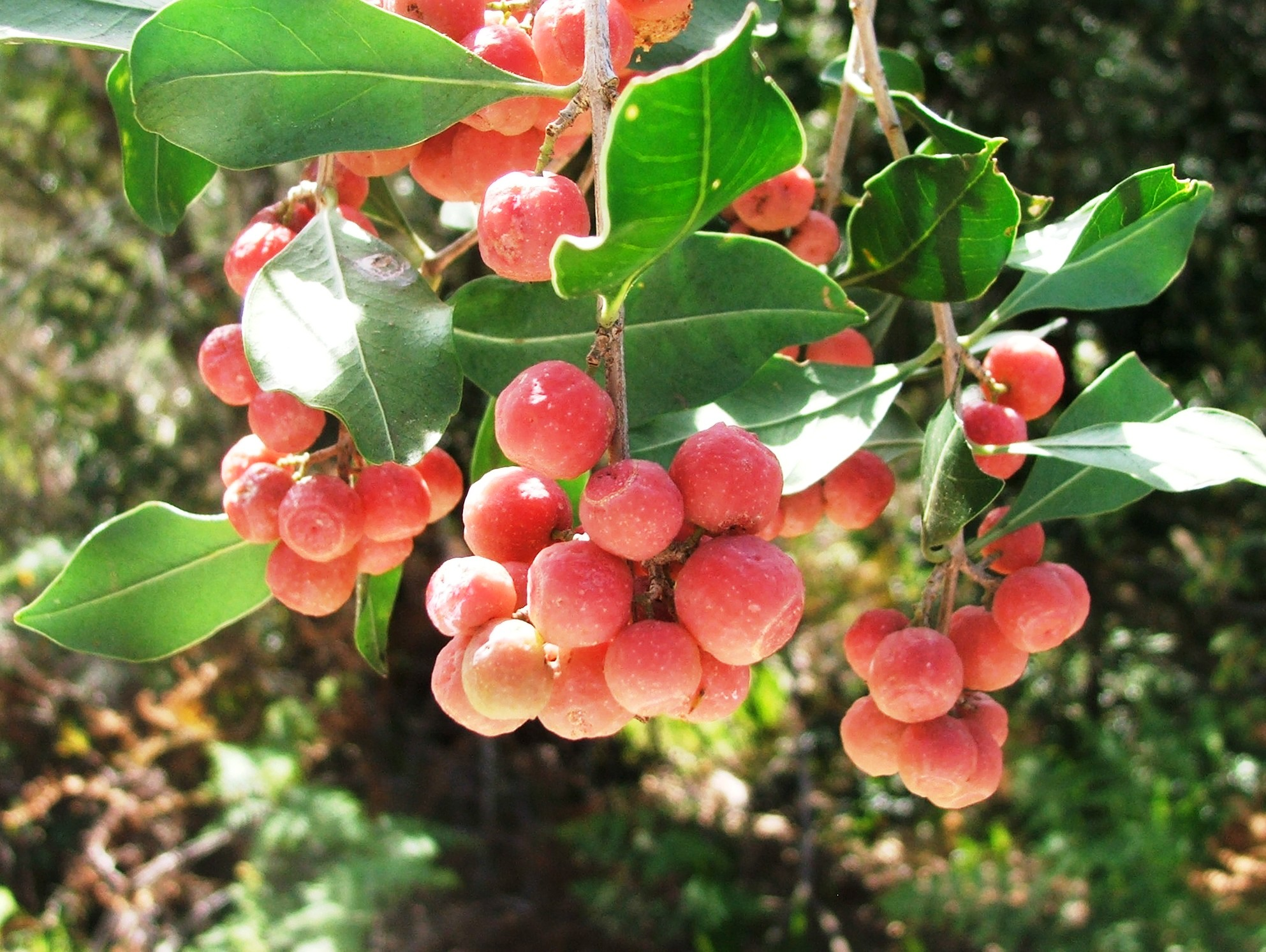
fruits

Olinia emarginata, the mountain hard pear or berghardepeer in Afrikaans language, is a tree species in the family Penaeaceae. It is native to South Africa and Lesotho.

Prunasin, a cyanogenic glucoside, can be found in the leaves of O. emarginata.

== See also ==
- List of Southern African indigenous trees and woody lianes
- Forests of KwaZulu-Natal
