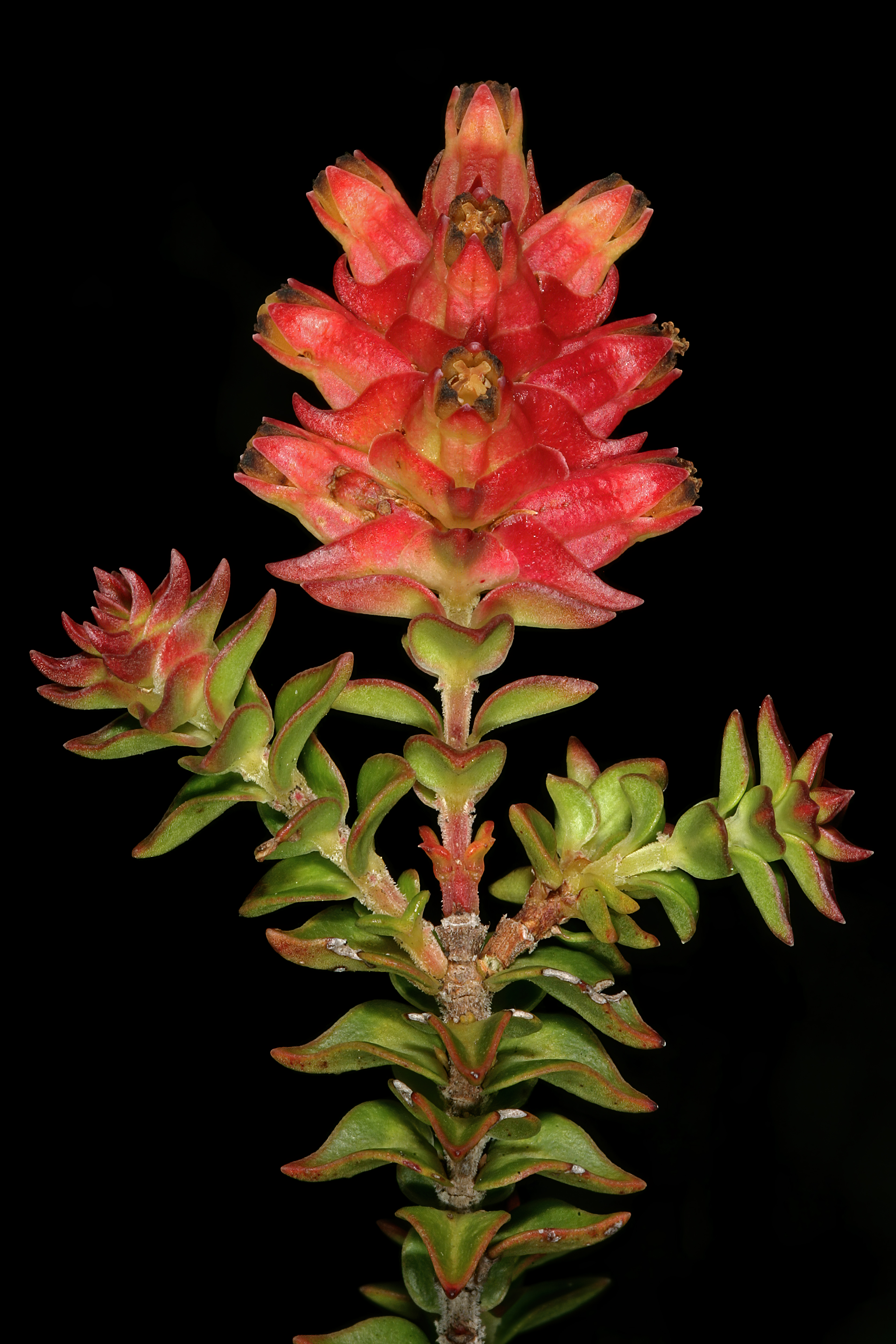
- Penaea mucronata

Scientific classification
- Kingdom: Plantae
- Clade: Tracheophytes
- Clade: Angiosperms
- Clade: Eudicots
- Clade: Rosids
- Order: Myrtales
- Family: Penaeaceae
- Genus: Penaea; L.

Species
- See text

Synonyms
- Brachysiphon A.Juss.; Endonema A.Juss.; Glischrocolla (Endl.) A.DC.; Saltera Bullock; Sarcocolla Boehm.; Sarcocolla Kunth; Sonderothamnus R.Dahlgren; Stylapterus A.Juss.

= Penaea =

Genus of flowering plants

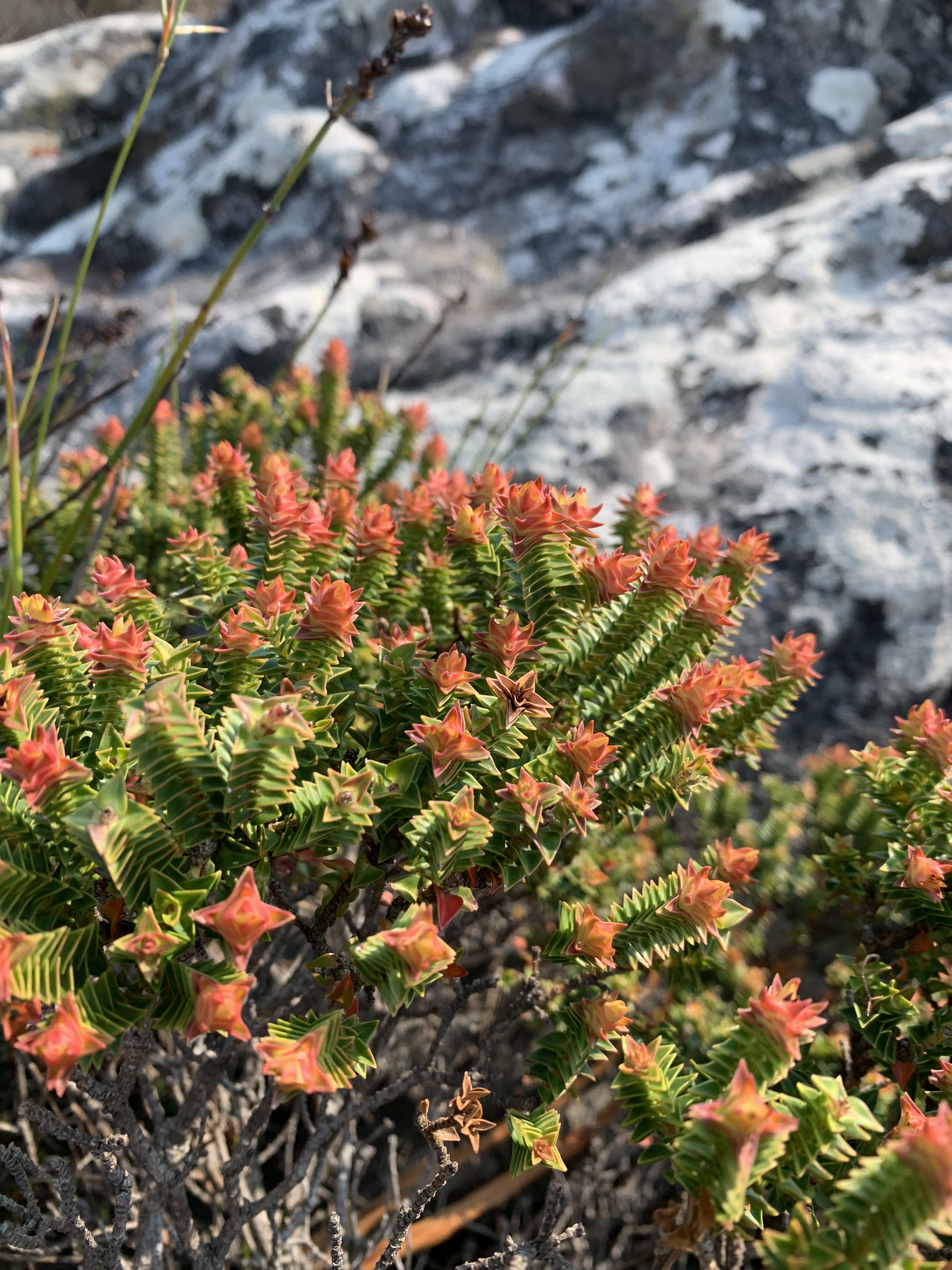
Penaea atop Table Mountain in Cape Town, South Africa

Penaea is a genus of flowering plants in the family Penaeaceae, found in southern South Africa. They have an unusual type of embryo sac development; after two rounds of mitosis, four nuclei are formed at each pole, leading to a mature embryo sac containing four polar groups each with three cells. When found in other taxa, these embryo sacs are termed Penaea-type.

== Species ==
Currently accepted species include:

- Penaea acuta Thunb.
- Penaea acutifolia A.Juss.
- Penaea candolleana Stephens
- Penaea cneorum Meerb.
- Penaea dahlgrenii Rourke
- Penaea dubia Stephens
- Penaea ericifolia (A.Juss.) Gilg
- Penaea ericoides (A.Juss.) Endl.
- Penaea formosa Thunb.
- Penaea fruticulosa L.f.
- Penaea fucata L.
- Penaea geneiophora Byng & Christenh.
- Penaea gigantea (R.Dahlgren) Byng & Christenh.
- Penaea lanceolata (R.Dahlgren) Byng & Christenh.
- Penaea lateriflora L.f.
- Penaea micrantha (R.Dahlgren) Byng & Christenh.
- Penaea microphylla (Rourke) Byng & Christenh.
- Penaea mucronata L.
- Penaea mundii (Sond.) Byng & Christenh.
- Penaea petraea (W.F.Barker) Byng & Christenh.
- Penaea retzioides (Sond.) Byng & Christenh.
- Penaea rupestris (Sond.) Byng & Christenh.
- Penaea ruscifolia (R.Dahlgren) Byng & Christenh.
- Penaea sarcocolla L.
- Penaea speciosa (Sond.) Byng & Christenh.
- Penaea sulcata (R.Dahlgren) Byng & Christenh.
