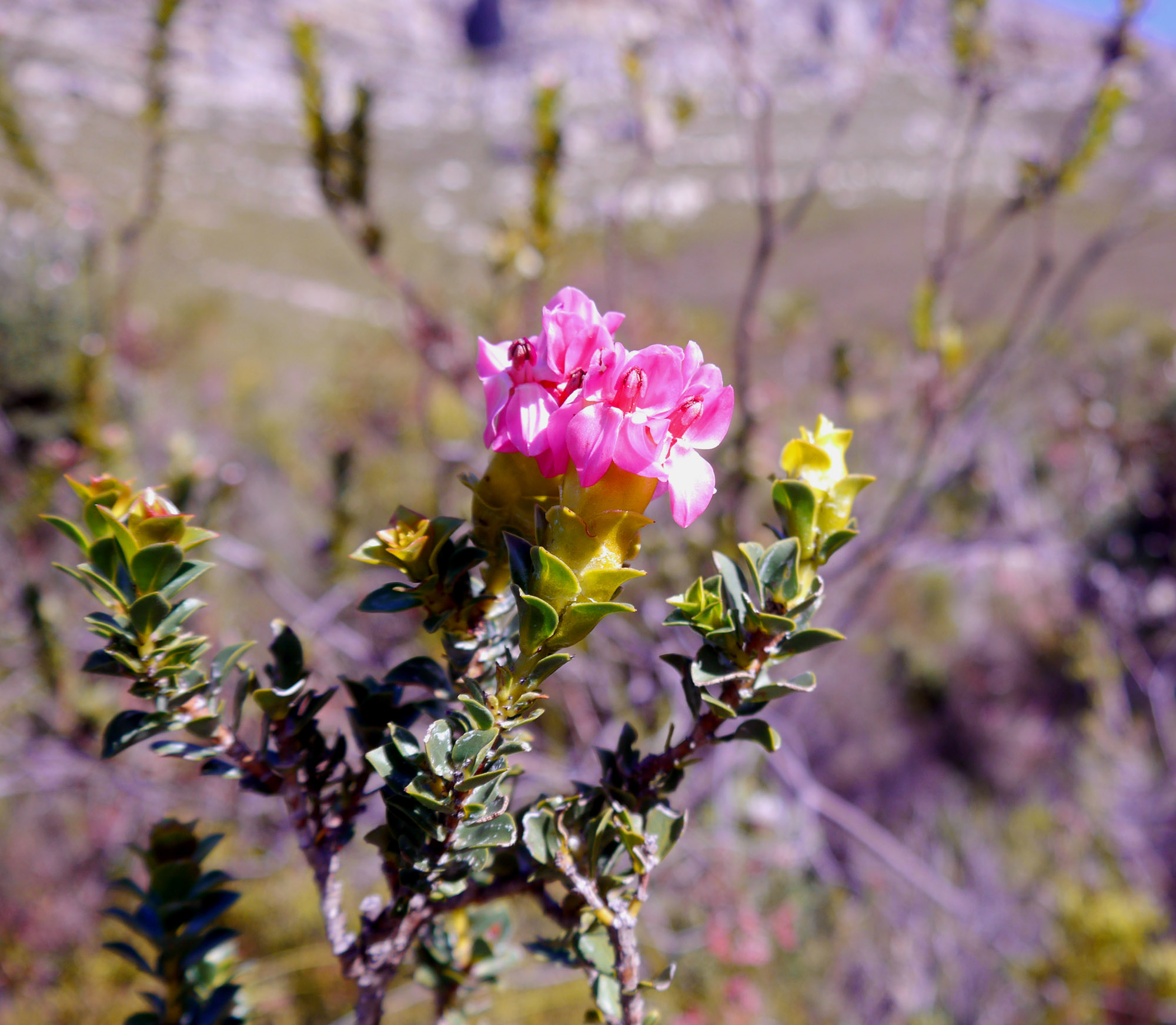

Conservation status
- Least Concern (SANBI Red List)

Scientific classification
- Kingdom: Plantae
- Clade: Tracheophytes
- Clade: Angiosperms
- Clade: Eudicots
- Clade: Rosids
- Order: Myrtales
- Family: Penaeaceae
- Genus: Penaea
- Species: P. sarcocolla

Binomial name
- Penaea sarcocolla L.

Synonyms
- Penaea longiflora Meerb.; Penaea squamosa L.; Penaea tetragona P.J.Bergius; Saltera sarcocolla (L.) Bullock; Sarcocolla linnaei A.Juss.; Sarcocolla longiflora Kunth; Sarcocolla minor A.DC.; Sarcocolla sarcocolla Kuntze; Sarcocolla squamosa (L.) Endl.; Sarcocolla tetragona (P.J.Bergius) T.M.Salter

= Penaea sarcocolla =

Species of shrub endemic to the Fybos region

Penaea sarcocolla is a species of shrub in the genus Penaea. It is endemic to the Western Cape, along the coast up to Cape Agulhas and extending inland to Franschhoek, Hottentots Holland Mountains, Villiersdorp and Genadendal. It is also known as the Cape fellwort.

It takes its name from a supposed resemblance to sarcocolla, the Asian source of Persian gum.
