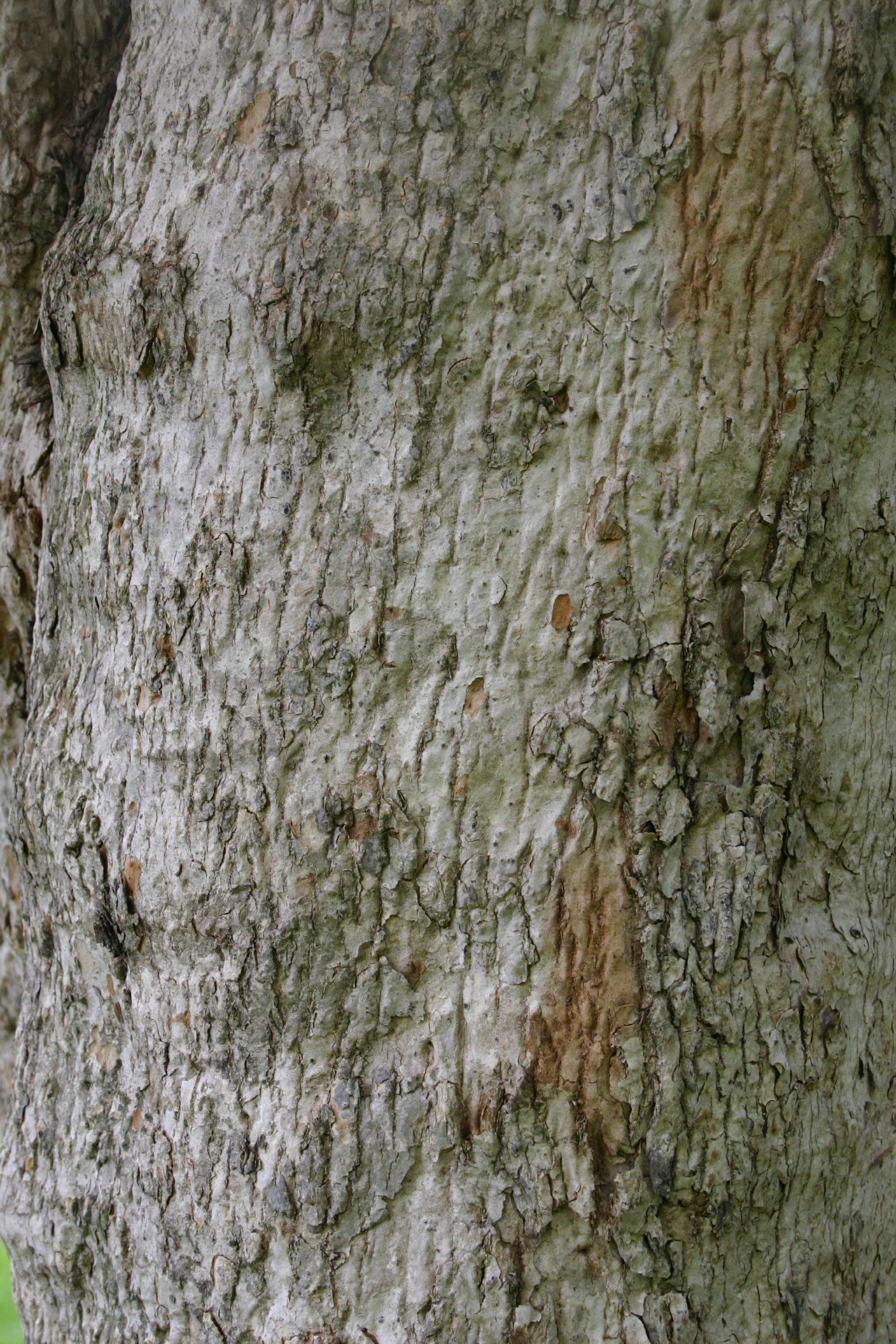
- Olinia emarginata

Scientific classification
- Kingdom: Plantae
- Clade: Tracheophytes
- Clade: Angiosperms
- Clade: Eudicots
- Clade: Rosids
- Order: Myrtales
- Family: Penaeaceae
- Genus: Olinia; Thunb.

Species
- Ten species, including: Olinia abyssinica Olinia accuminata Olinia capensis Olinia cymosa Olinia emarginata Olinia radiata Olinia rochetiana Olinia vanguerioides Olinia ventosa

= Olinia =

Genus of flowering plants

Olinia is a genus of small trees and shrubs with 10 species in the family Penaeaceae. The species of Olinia are native to Africa, ranging from west Africa to South Africa. It was previously regarded as the sole genus in the family Oliniaceae, but is now included in the expanded Penaeaceae along with Rhynchocalyx (formerly of the Rhynchocalycaceae) under the APG III system of classification.

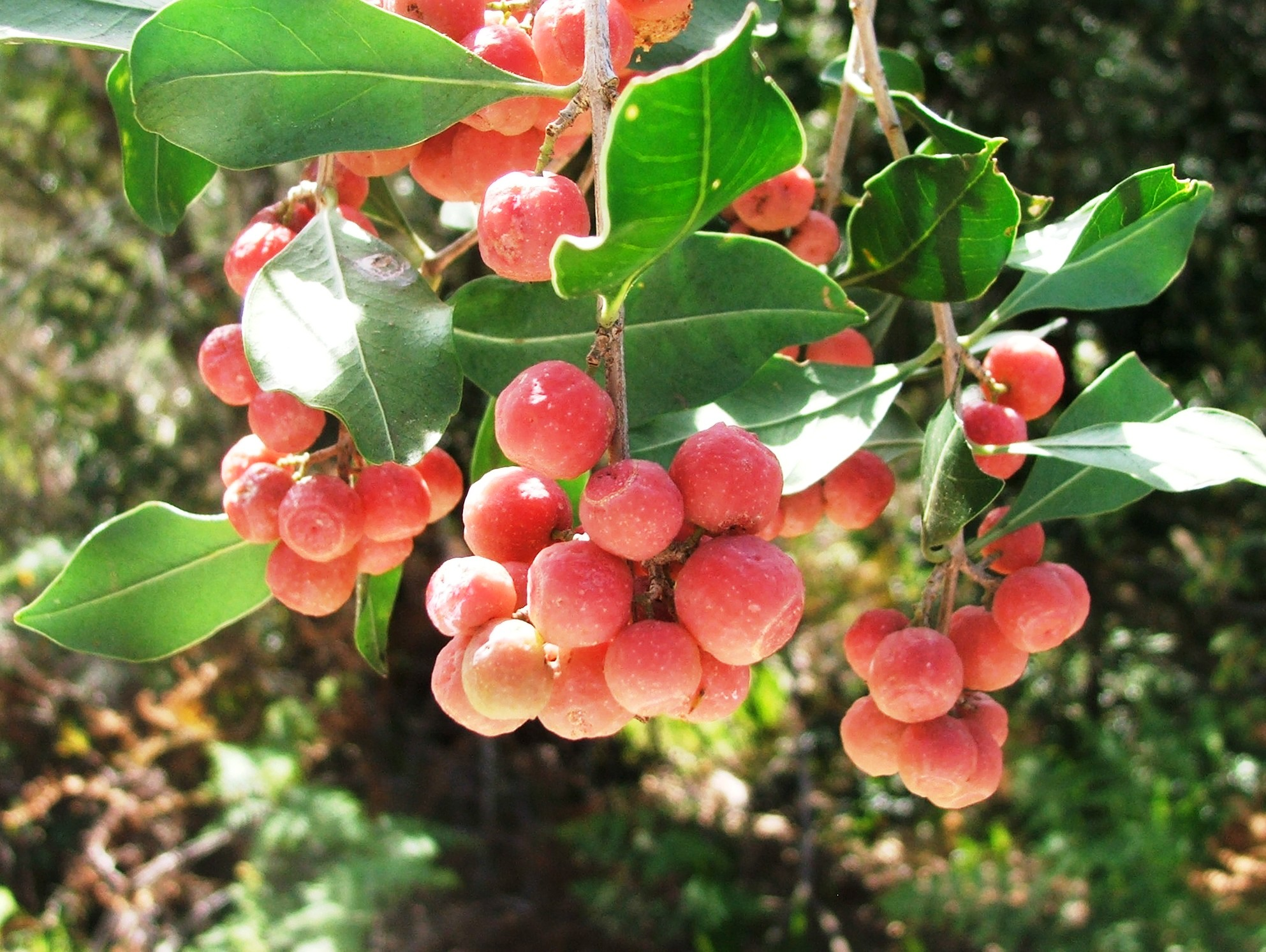
Olinia emarginata

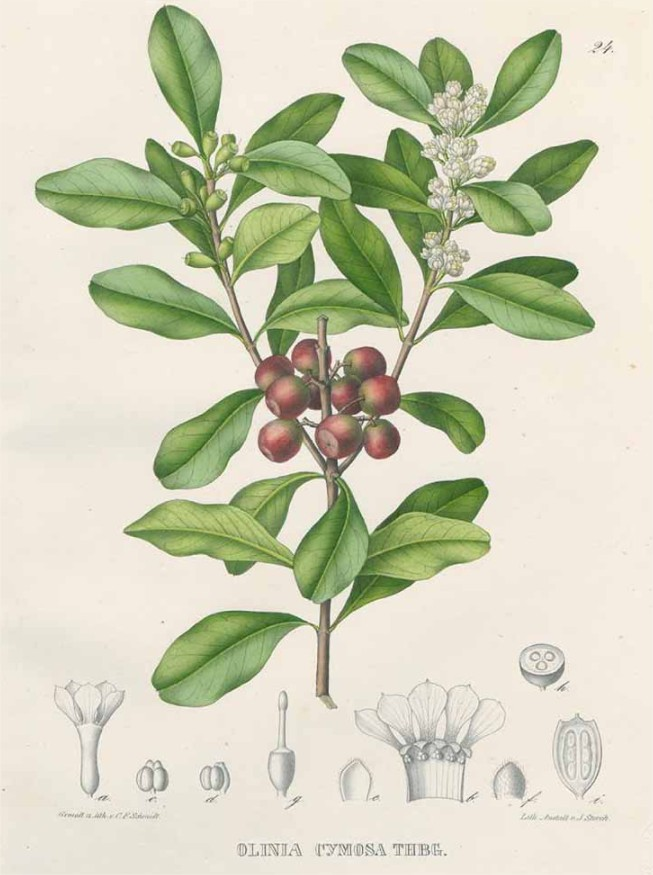
Olinia cymosa
