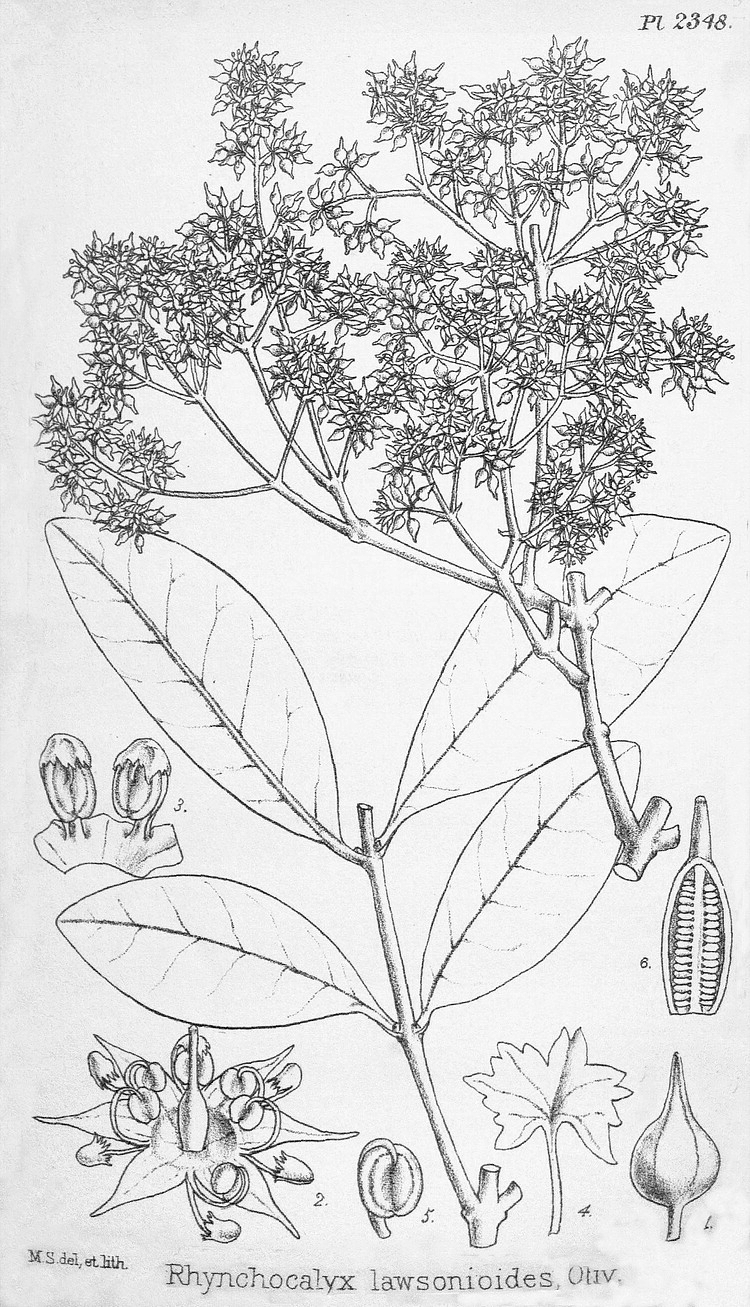
- by Matilda Smith

Conservation status
- Near Threatened (IUCN 3.1)

Scientific classification
- Kingdom: Plantae
- Clade: Tracheophytes
- Clade: Angiosperms
- Clade: Eudicots
- Clade: Rosids
- Order: Myrtales
- Family: Penaeaceae
- Genus: Rhynchocalyx; Oliv.
- Species: R. lawsonioides

Binomial name
- Rhynchocalyx lawsonioides Oliv.

= Rhynchocalyx =

Genus of trees

Rhynchocalyx lawsonioides, the false-waterberry, is a small flowering tree, the sole species of the genus Rhynchocalyx. It had also previously been regarded as the only species in the monogeneric family Rhynchocalycaceae but is now included in the expanded Penaeaceae along with Olinia (formerly of the Oliniaceae) under the APG III system of classification. Rhynchocalyx is endemic to the KwaZulu-Cape coastal forest mosaic ecoregion of the Natal and Eastern Cape provinces of South Africa.

== Distribution ==
Rhynchocalyx is found from Oribi Gorge to Port St. Johns, in Pondoland scarp forest habitat.
