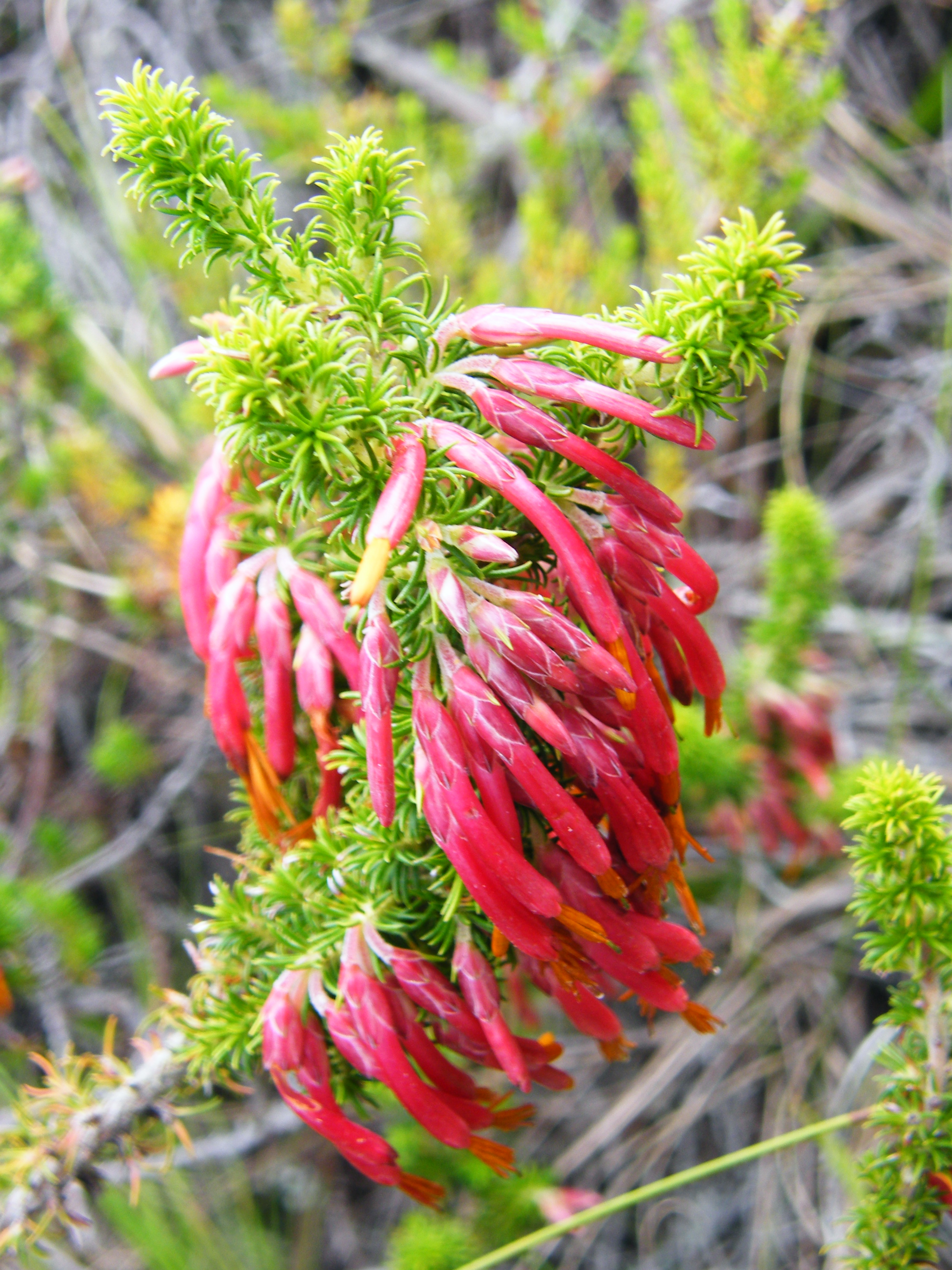

Scientific classification
- Kingdom: Plantae
- Clade: Tracheophytes
- Clade: Angiosperms
- Clade: Eudicots
- Clade: Asterids
- Order: Ericales
- Family: Ericaceae
- Genus: Erica
- Species: E. coccinea

Binomial name
- Erica coccinea L. (1753)

Synonyms
- Ericoides coccineum (L.) Kuntze

= Erica coccinea =

Species of flowering plant

Erica coccinea , the hanging heath, is a species of flowering plant in the genus Erica, part of the fynbos. The species is endemic to Western Cape in South Africa, with some found in Free State.
