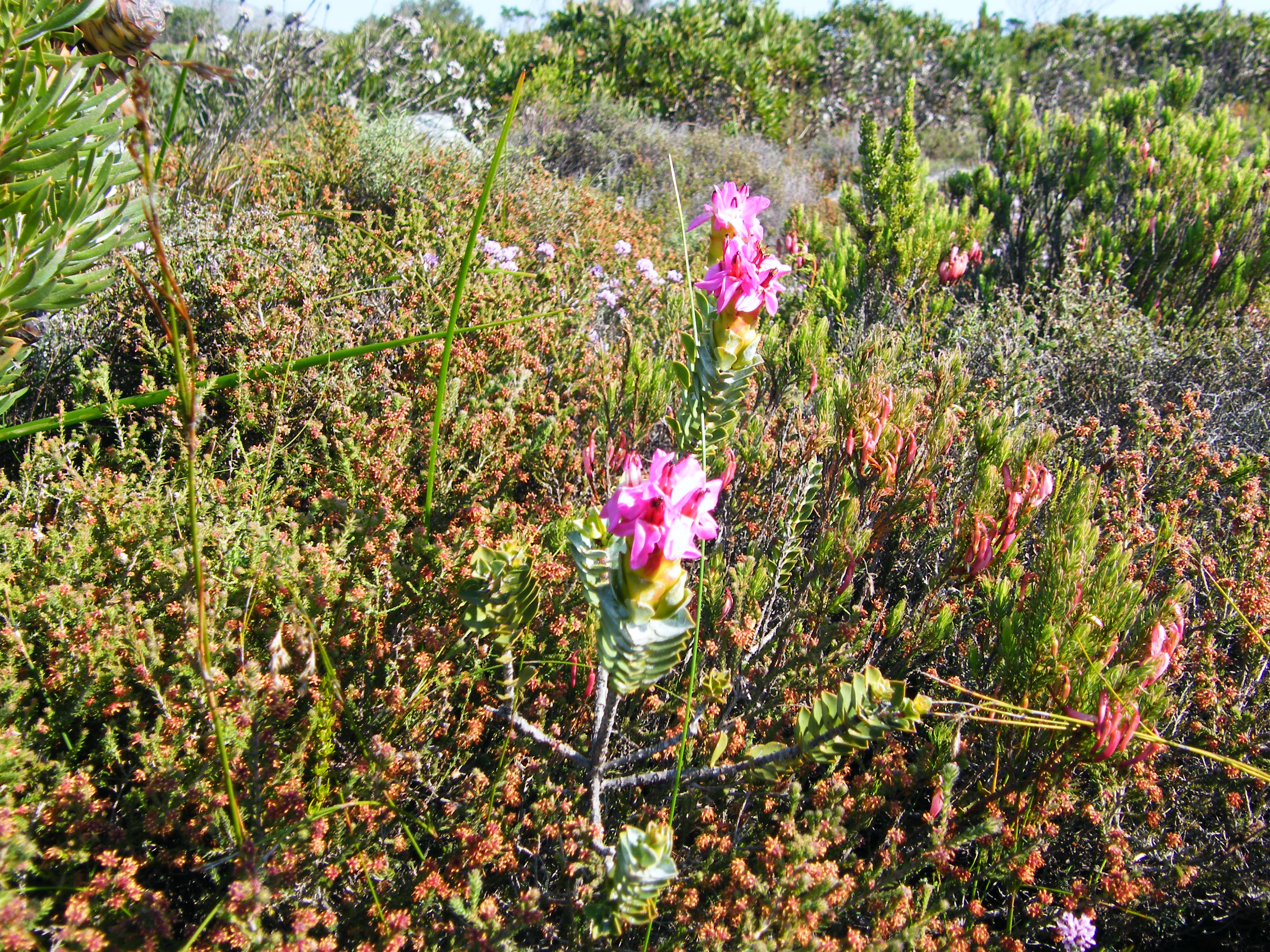
- Saltera sarcocolla

Scientific classification
- Kingdom: Plantae
- Clade: Tracheophytes
- Clade: Angiosperms
- Clade: Eudicots
- Clade: Rosids
- Order: Myrtales
- Family: Penaeaceae; Sweet ex Guill.

Genera
- Brachysiphon; Endonema; Glischrocolla; Olinia; Penaea; Rhynchocalyx; Saltera; Sonderothamnus; Stylapterus

= Penaeaceae =

Family of shrubs

The Penaeaceae are a family of evergreen, leathery-leaved shrubs and small trees, native to South Africa. The family has 29 species in 9 genera. The family Penaeaceae was expanded under the APG III system of classification with the inclusion of the genera Olinia (formerly in the monogeneric Oliniaceae) and the single species from the genus Rhynchocalyx (formerly in the monogeneric Rhynchocalycaceae).
