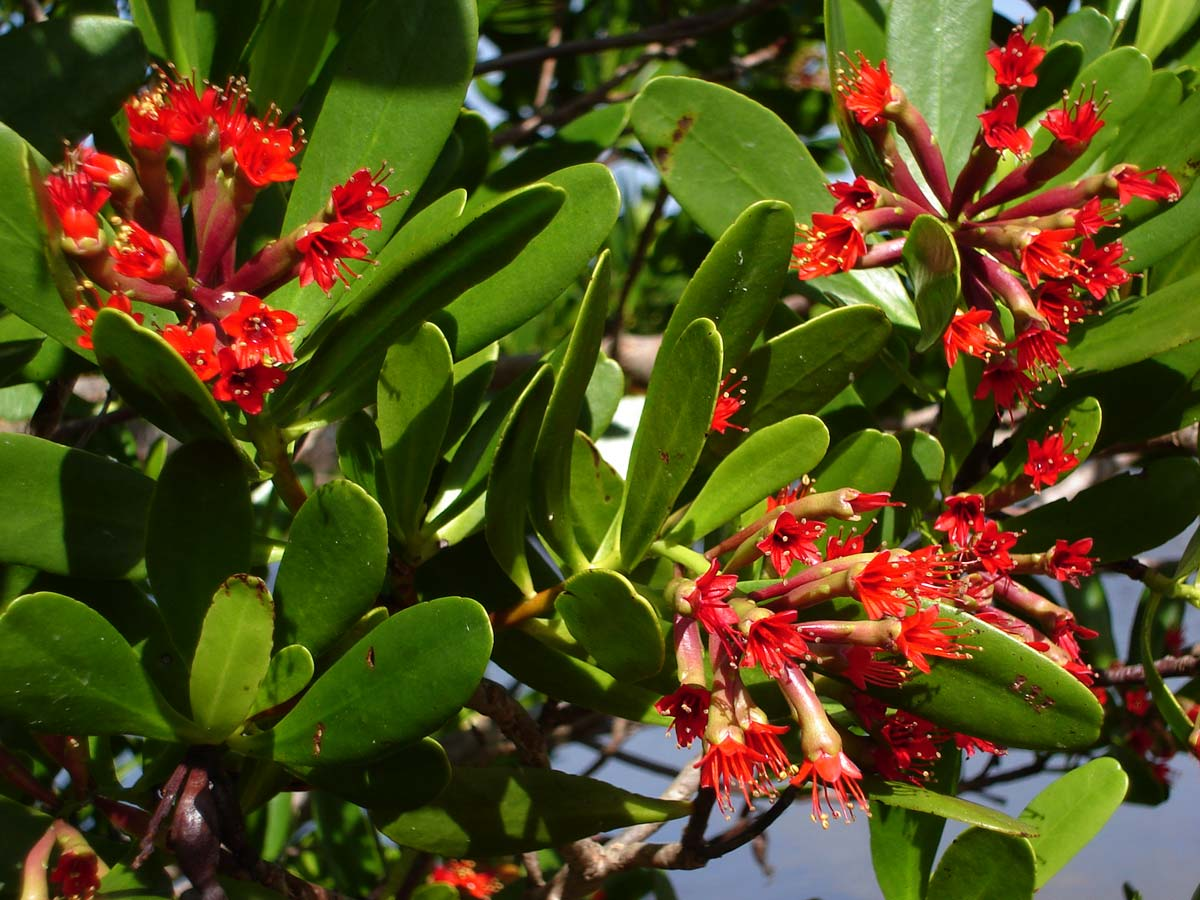
- Lumnitzera littorea

Scientific classification
- Kingdom: Plantae
- Clade: Tracheophytes
- Clade: Angiosperms
- Clade: Eudicots
- Clade: Rosids
- Clade: Malvids
- Order: Myrtales; Juss. ex Bercht. & J.Presl

Families
- Alzateaceae; Combretaceae; Crypteroniaceae; Lythraceae; Melastomataceae; Myrtaceae; Onagraceae; Penaeaceae; Vochysiaceae

= Myrtales =

Myrtales Temporal range: Turonian - recent

Order of flowering plants

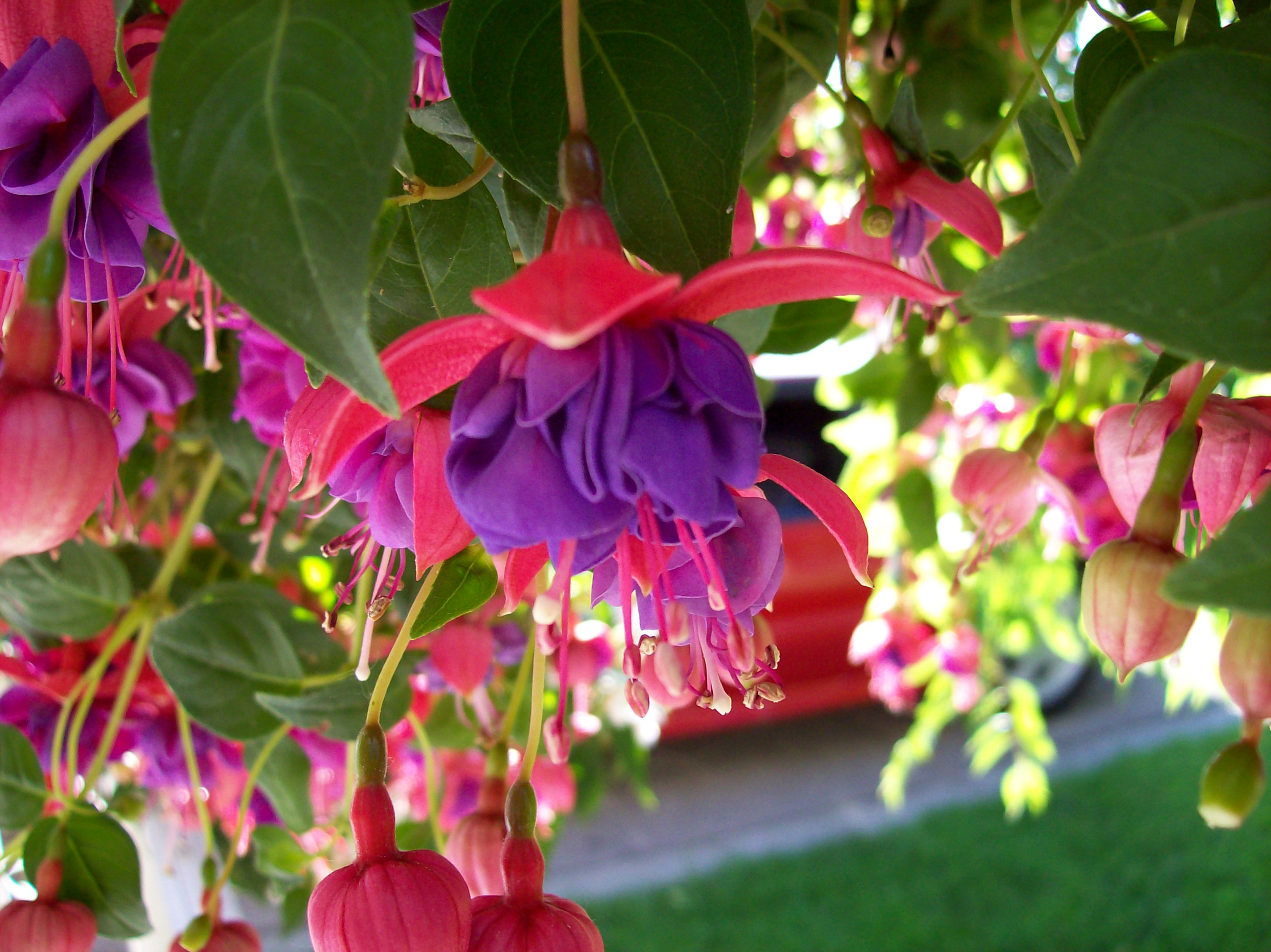
Fuchsia hybrid 'Blue Eyes' in bloom (order Myrtales, family Onagraceae).

The Myrtales are an order of flowering plants, in the malvid clade of the rosid group of dicotyledons. Well-known members of Myrtales include: myrtle, pōhutukawa, bay rum tree, clove, guava, acca (feijoa), allspice, eucalyptus, crape myrtles, henna tree, pomegranate, water caltrop, loosestrifes, cupheas (cigar plants), evening primroses, fuchsias, willowherbs, white mangrove, leadwood tree, African birch, Koster's curse, and velvet tree.

== Taxonomy ==
Myrtales include the following nine families, according to the APG III system of classification:

- Alzateaceae
- Combretaceae (leadwood family)
- Crypteroniaceae
- Lythraceae (loosestrife and pomegranate family)
- Melastomataceae (including Memecylaceae)
- Myrtaceae (myrtle family; including Heteropyxidaceae, Psiloxylaceae)
- Onagraceae (evening primrose and Fuchsia family)
- Penaeaceae (including Oliniaceae, Rhynchocalycaceae)
- Vochysiaceae

The APG III system places the order within the eurosids; this is corroborated by the placement of the Myrtales in the Malvid clade by the One Thousand Plant Transcriptomes Initiative.

Myrtales are placed as a sister to the eurosids II clade as of the publishing of the Eucalyptus grandis genome in June 2014.

The Cronquist system gives essentially the same composition, except the Vochysiaceae are removed to the order Polygalales, and the Thymelaeaceae are included. The families Sonneratiaceae, Trapaceae, and Punicaceae are removed from the Lythraceae. In the classification system of Dahlgren the Myrtales were in the superorder Myrtiflorae (also called Myrtanae). The APG III system agrees with the older Cronquist circumscriptions of treating Psiloxylaceae and Heteropyxidaceae within Myrtaceae, and Memecyclaceae within Melastomataceae.

Ellagitannins are reported in dicotyledoneous angiosperms, and notably in species in the order Myrtales.

== Origins ==
Myrtales is dated to around 89–99 million years ago (mya) in Australasia; however, there is some contention as to that date, which was obtained using nuclear DNA. When looking at chloroplast DNA, the myrtales' ancestor is, instead, considered to have evolved during the mid-Cretaceous period (100 mya) in Southeast Africa, rather than in Australasia. Although the APG system classifies myrtales as within the eurosids, the recently published genome of Eucalyptus grandis places the order myrtales as a sister to the eurosids rather than inside them. The discrepancy is thought to have arisen due to the difference between using numerous taxa versus using various genes for constructing a phylogeny.
