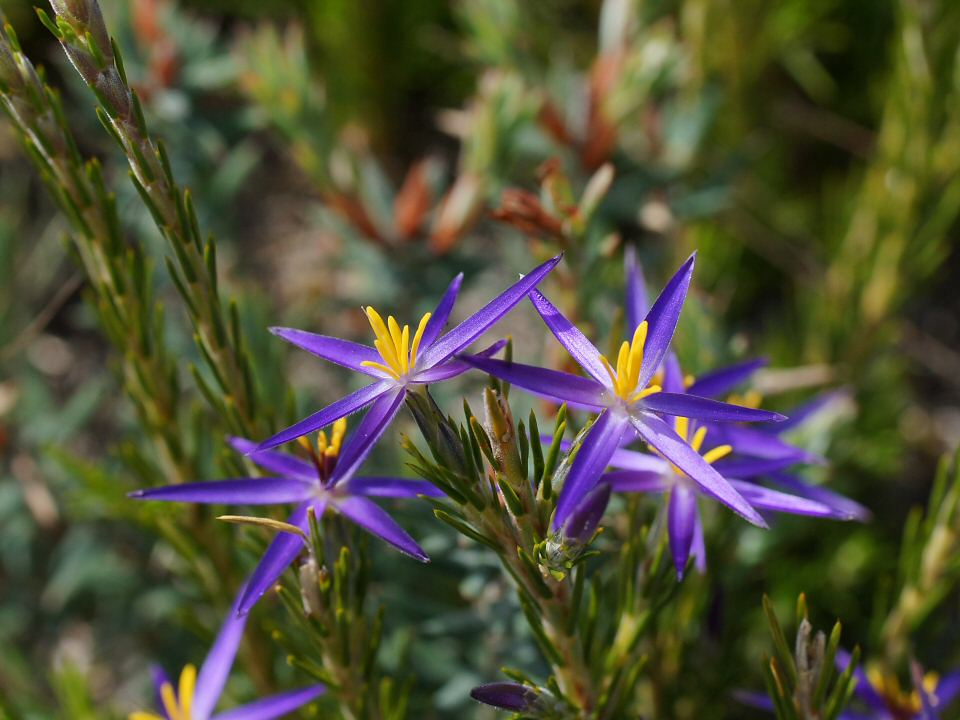
- Calectasia intermedia at Yallakar State Forest, near Edenhope western Victoria.

Scientific classification
- Kingdom: Plantae
- Clade: Tracheophytes
- Clade: Angiosperms
- Clade: Monocots
- Clade: Commelinids
- Order: Arecales
- Family: Dasypogonaceae
- Genus: Calectasia
- Species: C. intermedia

Binomial name
- Calectasia intermedia Sond.
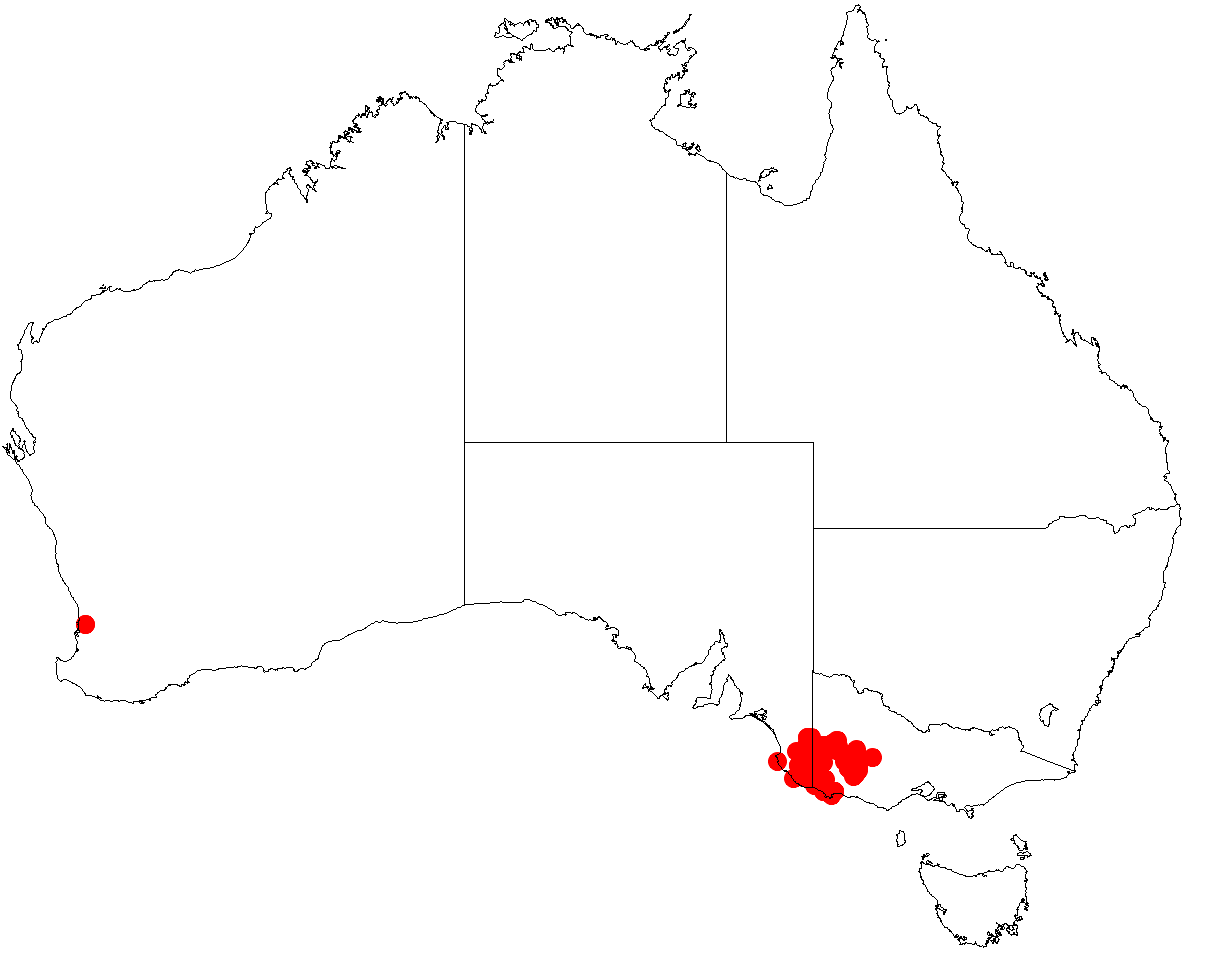
- Occurrence data from AVH

Synonyms
- C. cyanea var. intermedia (Sond.) Anway; Scaryomyrtus hexamera F.Muell.

= Calectasia intermedia =

Species of plant

Calectasia intermedia, commonly known as blue tinsel-lily or eastern tinsel lily is a species of flowering plant in the family Dasypogonaceae, endemic to the border areas of western Victoria and south-eastern South Australia and flowering in early spring. It is the only member of the genus Calectasia that is not endemic to Western Australia.

== Description ==
Calectasia intermedia is a rhizomatous perennial herb growing to a height of about 65 cm (25.5 in) as an undershrub. The rhizome is about 50 cm (19.5 in) long, horizontal and buried about 7–10 cm (3–4 in) deep and there are no stilt roots. The stems have many side branches and bear leaves with few hairs. Each leaf is about 5.7–16.8 x 0.5–0.8 mm (0.2–0.7 x 0.02–0.03 in) and tapers to a short, sharp point on the end. The base of the petals (strictly tepals) form a tube 10.5–11.6 mm (0.41–0.46 in) long, while the outer parts spread outwards to form a blue, papery star-like pattern which does not fade with age. In the centre of the star are six yellow stamens forming a tube which turns orange-brown with age. The thin style extends beyond the stamens. Flowers appear from September to October.

== Taxonomy and naming ==
Calectasia intermedia is one of eleven species in the genus Calectasia. It was formally described in 1856 by German botanist Otto Wilhelm Sonder, based on plant material collected by Ferdinand von Mueller in the Grampians in Victoria. The description was published in the journal Linnaea: ein Journal für die Botanik in ihrem ganzen Umfange, oder Beiträge zur Pflanzenkunde. The specific epithet (intermedia) is from the Latin intermedius "coming between", referring to its apparent intermediate appearance between C. cyanea and C. grandiflora, the only two other species recognised at the time.

== Distribution and habitat ==
C. intermedia occurs from Bordertown in the far south-eastern corner of South Australia including the Calectasia Conservation Park, east to the Grampians and Little Desert, south-western Victoria. It grows in open Eucalyptus woodland on sandy soil and in heath. Its distribution is sporadic, due to the clearing of its habitat but it is not considered to be at risk.
