= Calectasia palustris =

Conservation status
- Priority Two — Poorly Known Taxa (DEC)

Scientific classification
- Kingdom: Plantae
- Clade: Tracheophytes
- Clade: Angiosperms
- Clade: Monocots
- Clade: Commelinids
- Order: Arecales
- Family: Dasypogonaceae
- Genus: Calectasia
- Species: C. palustris

Binomial name
- Calectasia palustris R.L.Barrett & K.W.Dixon

Species of flowering plant

Calectasia palustris, commonly known as a blue tinsel lily or swamp tinsel lily is a plant in the family Dasypogonaceae growing as a perennial, tufted herb with stilt roots. It is an uncommon species, endemic and restricted to a few areas in the south-west of Western Australia. It is similar to the other species of Calectasia and has only been recognised as a separate species since a review of the genus in 2001.

== Description ==
Calectasia palustris is an undershrub with stilt roots 40–110 mm long but without a rhizome. It grows to a height of about 70 cm with many short side branches. Each leaf blade is 7–23 x 0.4–0.7 mm tapering to a short, sharp point on the end. The base of the petals (strictly tepals) form a tube 9.9–10.1 mm long, while the outer parts spread outwards to form a blue, papery star-like pattern fading to red with age. In the centre of the star are six yellow stamens forming a tube which does not turn orange-red with age. The thin style extends beyond the stamens. It is similar to the more common and widespread C. grandiflora except that it has stilt roots and no rhizome. It is also similar to C. obtusa except that there is a sharp point on the leaf tips, also possessed by most other members of the genus. Flowers appear from July to October.

== Taxonomy and naming ==
Calectasia palustris is one of eleven species in the genus Calectasia. It was described as a new species in 2001 by K.W. Dixon and R.L. Barrett from a specimen collected south-west of Badgingarra. The specific epithet (palustris) is derived from the Latin palustria, "swampy", referring to the unusual habitat preference for this species.

== Distribution and habitat ==
This species of tinsel lily is uncommon and found in only two, separate areas of the south-west of Western Australia 70 kilometres apart between Cervantes and Coorow. These are in the Geraldton Sandplains and Swan Coastal Plain biogeographic regions. It grows in seasonally inundated swamp and in grey sand.

== Conservation status ==
Calectasia palustris is classified as "Priority Two" by the Western Australian government department of parks and wildlife meaning that it is poorly known and known from only one or a few locations.
