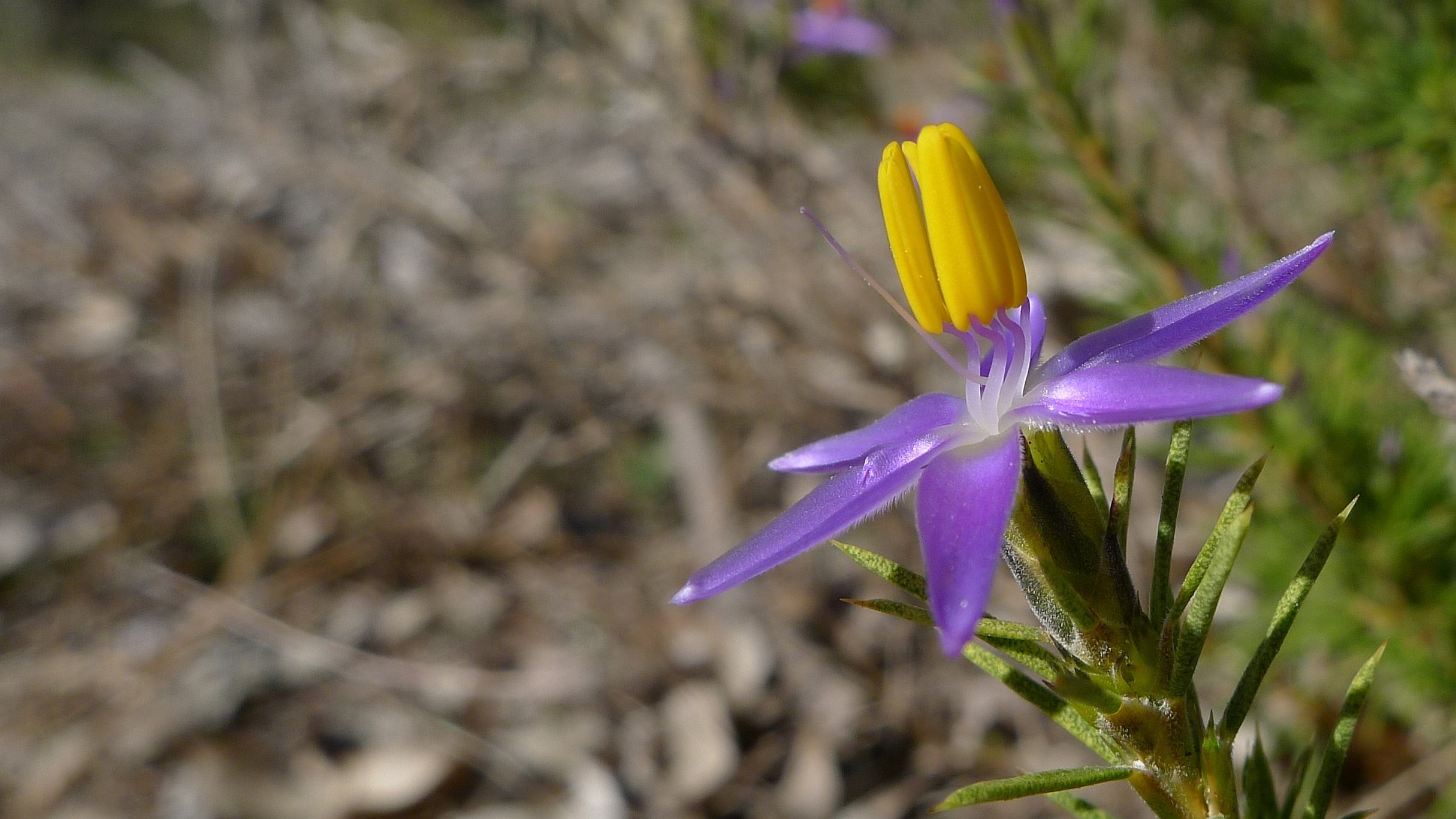
- Calectasia narragara young flower

Scientific classification
- Kingdom: Plantae
- Clade: Tracheophytes
- Clade: Angiosperms
- Clade: Monocots
- Clade: Commelinids
- Order: Arecales
- Family: Dasypogonaceae
- Genus: Calectasia
- Species: C. narragara

Binomial name
- Calectasia narragara R.L.Barrett & K.W.Dixon
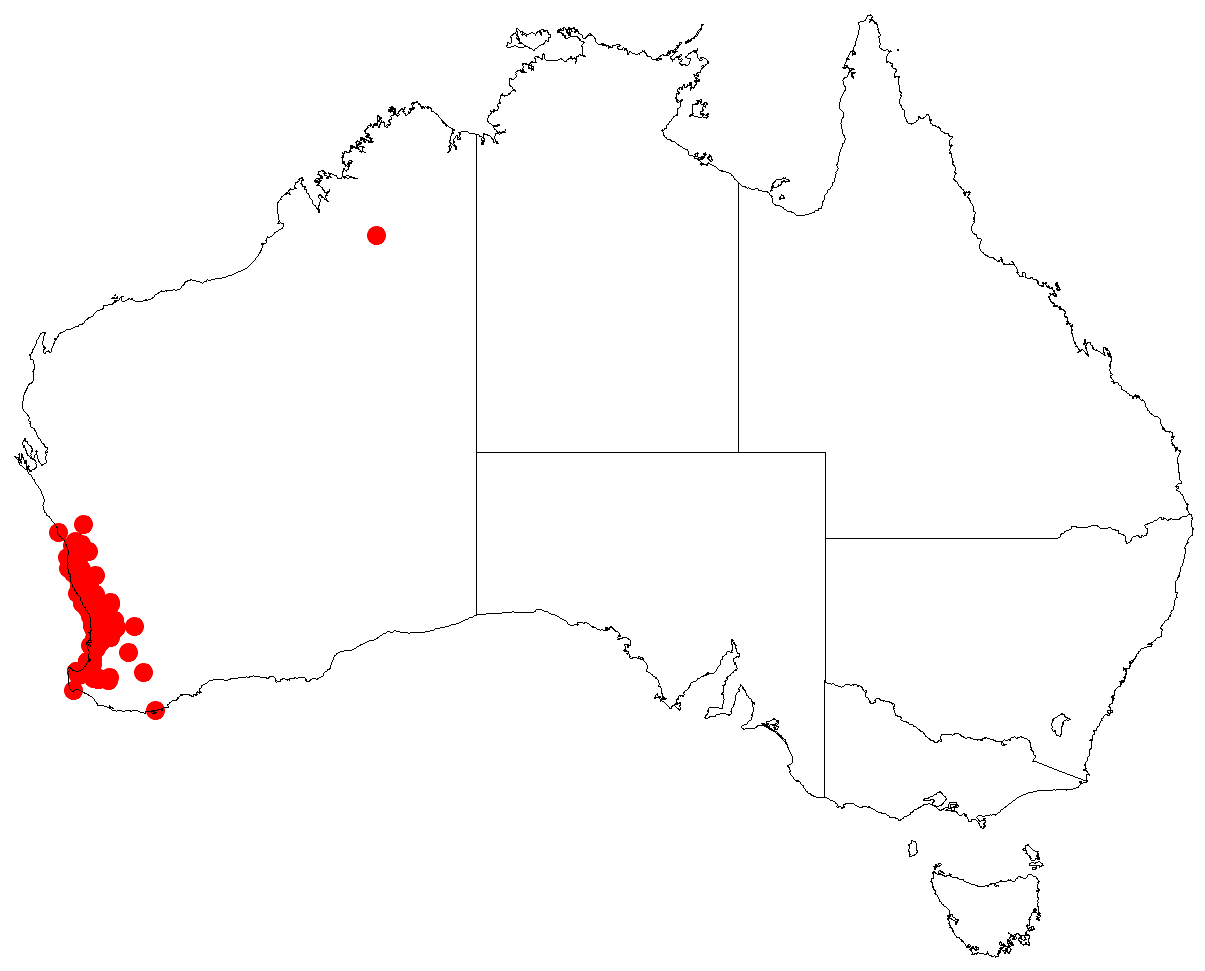
- Occurrence data from AVH

= Calectasia narragara =

Species of flowering plant

Calectasia narragara, commonly known as a blue tinsel lily or star of Bethlehem, is a plant in the family Dasypogonaceae growing as a tufted rhizomatous herb. It is endemic to the southwest of Western Australia and common in most of its range.

== Description ==
Calectasia narragara is an undershrub without stilt roots but with a short rhizome from which it can form clones. The roots are clustered, wiry and sand-binding. It grows to a height of about 50 centimetres (20 in) with many very short side branches. Each leaf blade is glabrous except sometimes at the margins, 4.2–14.5 millimetres (0.2–0.6 in) long, 0.4–1.0 millimetre (0.02–0.04 in) wide tapering to a short, sharp point on the end. The base of the petals (strictly tepals) form a tube 8.9–10.2 millimetres (0.35–0.40 in) long, which, unlike most others in the genus (but not C. hispida), is glabrous. The outer part of the petals is blue with bronze margins and spread outwards to form a papery, star-like pattern that fades to white with age. In the centre of the star are six yellow stamens forming a tube that turns orange-red with age. The thin style sometimes extends beyond the stamens. It is similar to the other species of Calectasia and is distinguished from them by a combination of the presence of a short, compact rhizome, lack of stilt leaves, the glabrousness of the leaf blades and the change in colour of the petals and stamens with age. Flowers mostly appear from June to September.

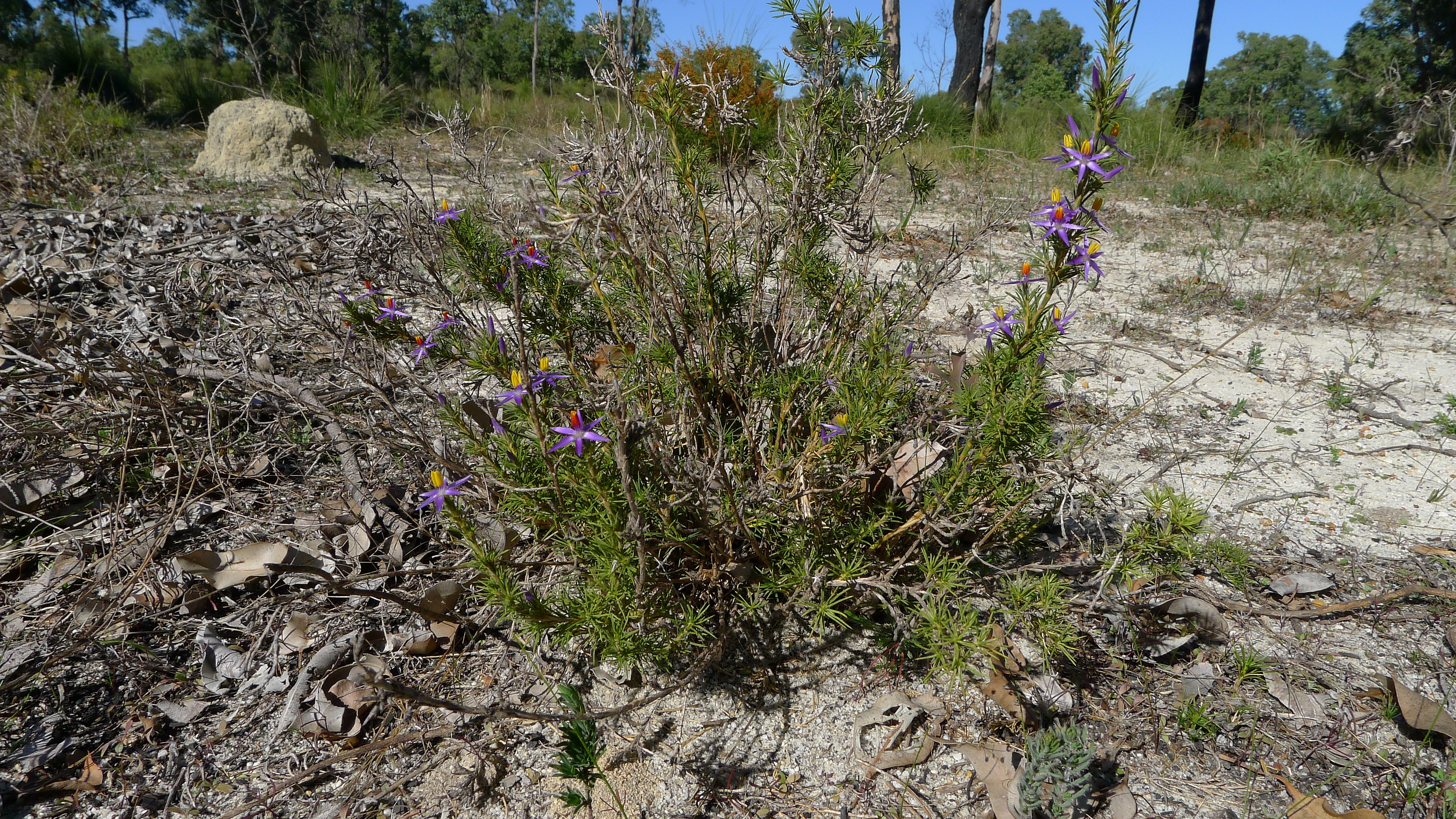
Calectasia narragara in Talbot Road Reserve, Swan View

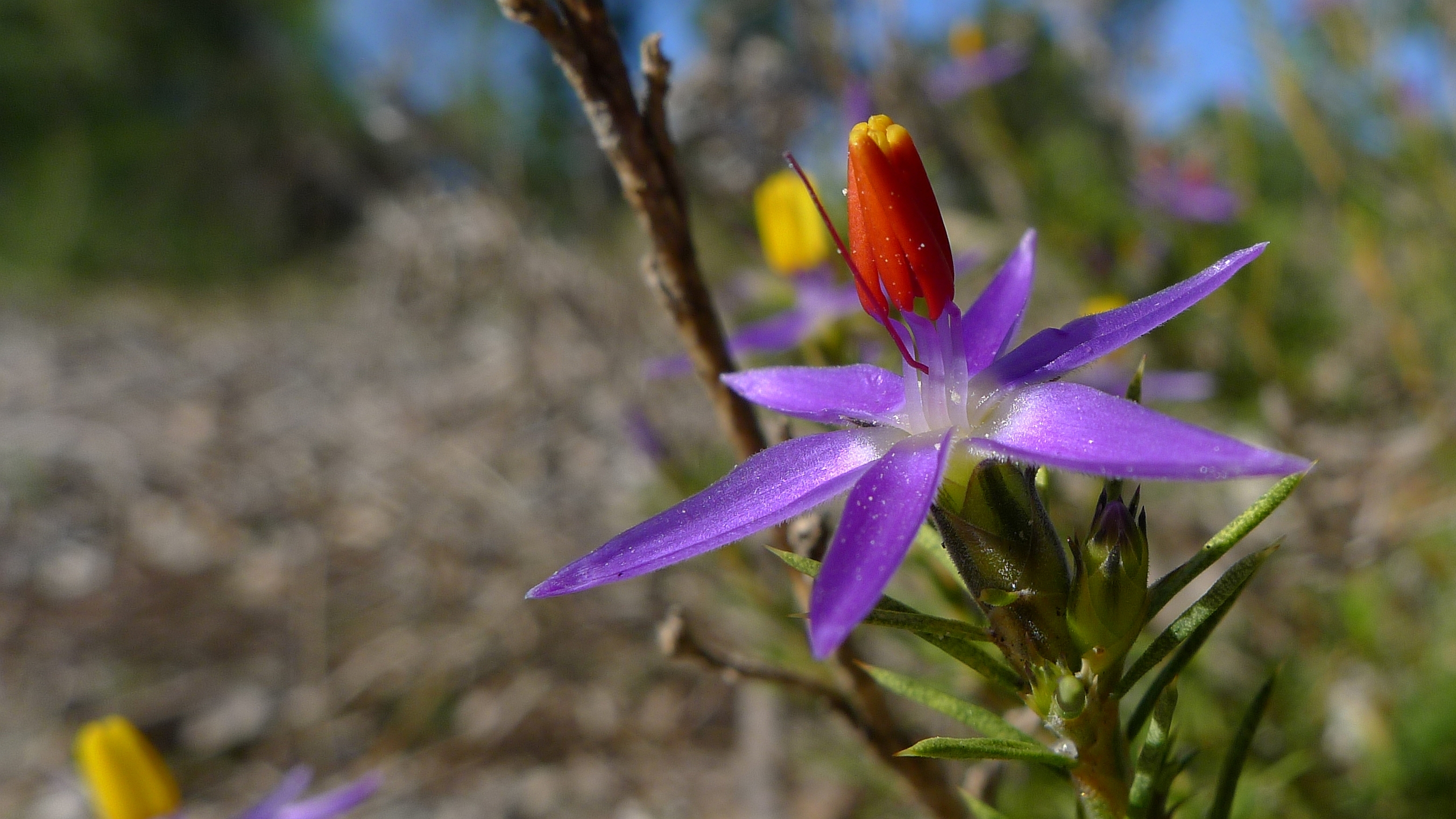
Calectasia narragara older flower with red stamens

== Taxonomy and naming ==
Calectasia narragara is one of eleven species in the genus Calectasia. It was described as a new species in 2001 by R.L. Barrett and K.W. Dixon from a specimen collected in Kings Park, near the nature trail, 0.5 km west of the Roe Memorial. (The Roe Memorial commemorates John Septimus Roe, Western Australia's first surveyor-general.)

The specific epithet (narragara) is a composite Nyoongar name for a star, chosen for the common name of "Star of Bethlehem" which has often been applied to this species.

== Distribution and habitat ==
This species of blue tinsel lily is widespread and common within 80 kilometres of the coast on the Swan Coastal Plain and Darling Scarp from Busselton north to Geraldton, in the South West Botanical Province. It usually grows in a wide range of vegetation associations and habitats, including kwongan, woodland on white, grey, or yellow sand, and occasionally in swampy areas.

== Conservation status ==
Calectasia narragara is classified as not threatened.
