= Calectasia pignattiana =

Stilted tinsel lily

Conservation status
- Vulnerable (EPBC Act)

Scientific classification
- Kingdom: Plantae
- Clade: Tracheophytes
- Clade: Angiosperms
- Clade: Monocots
- Clade: Commelinids
- Order: Arecales
- Family: Dasypogonaceae
- Genus: Calectasia
- Species: C. pignattiana

Binomial name
- Calectasia pignattiana K.W.Dixon & R.L.Barrett

Species of flowering plant

Calectasia pignattiana, commonly known as the stilted tinsel lily or Pignatti's star of Bethlehem, is a plant in the family Dasypogonaceae growing as a perennial herb and is endemic to the south–west of Western Australia. It is only known from ten locations, four of which are on road verges. The species is classified as vulnerable.

== Description ==
Calectasia pignattiana is a prickly, rhizomatous herb growing to a height of about 50 cm. Unlike some other members of the genus (such as C. grandiflora) this species lacks a rhizome but has stilt roots 10–60 mm long. The stems are up to 60 cm long and slender, with many lateral branches, occasionally with adventitious stilt roots up to 150 mm long protruding from the upper branches. The leaves are 5.2–11.5 x 0.9–1.4 mm and glabrous. The six petals are dark blue, gradually fading to white with age and the central anthers are yellow, turning orange-red with age. Flowers appear from June to September.

== Taxonomy and naming ==
Calectasia pignattiana is one of eleven species in the genus Calectasia. It was described as a new species in 2001 by R.L.Barrett & K.W.Dixon from a specimen collected near Quairading. The specific epithet (pignattiana) "honours Professors Erika and Alessandro Pignatti of Rome on the occasion of their seventieth birthdays. They have contributed greatly to our knowledge of south-west vegetation associations and have collected extensively, including many taxa new to science".

== Distribution and habitat ==
The stilted tinsel lily is considered vulnerable because four of the ten locations where it has been found are on road verges, one population is in danger from frequent fire events, another is thought to have been cleared, one site has only one plant, other two plants. It grows in yellow sand lenses, in kwongan dominated by Proteaceae - a relatively restricted soil type.

== Conservation status ==
Calectasia pignattiana is classified as vulnerable by the Australian Government Department of the Environment and Water Resources and the Department of the Environment, Canberra. It is vulnerable to, and threatened by the European rabbit.
