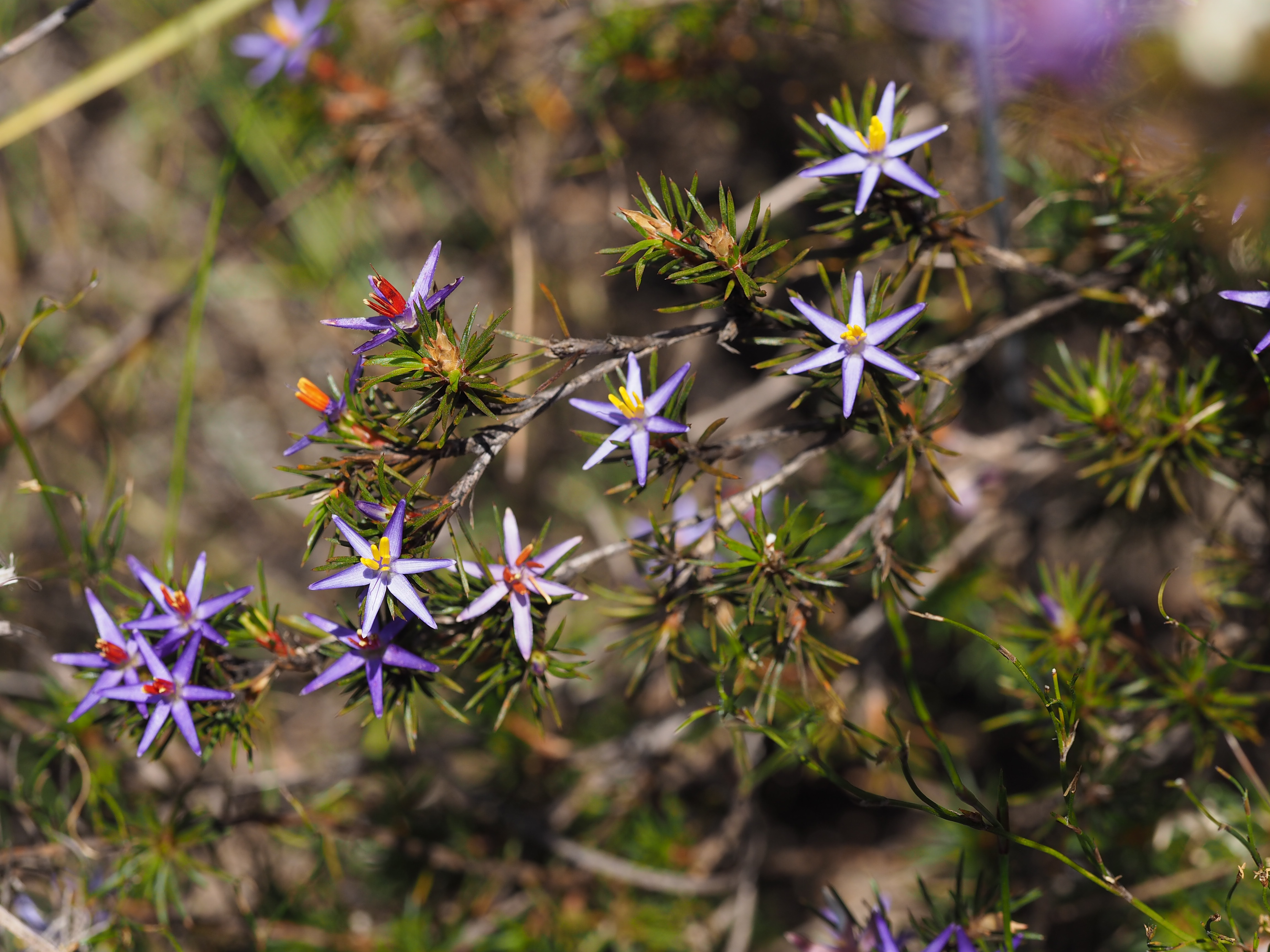
- Calectasia cyanea growing near Albany.

Conservation status
- Critically endangered (EPBC Act)

Scientific classification
- Kingdom: Plantae
- Clade: Tracheophytes
- Clade: Angiosperms
- Clade: Monocots
- Clade: Commelinids
- Order: Arecales
- Family: Dasypogonaceae
- Genus: Calectasia
- Species: C. cyanea

Binomial name
- Calectasia cyanea R.Br.

= Calectasia cyanea =

Star of Bethlehem

Species of plant

Calectasia cyanea, commonly known as the star of Bethlehem or blue tinsel lily, is a plant in the family Dasypogonaceae growing as a perennial herb and is endemic to the south–west of Western Australia. Restricted to a single population in Torndirrup National Park, it is critically endangered.

== Description ==
Calectasia cyanea is a clump forming woody perennial herb growing to a height of about 60 centimetres (20 in) and a width of 30 centimetres (10 in). Unlike some other members of the genus (such as C. grandiflora) this species lacks a rhizome, the stems have only a few short side branches and the leaves are 6.5–13.2 millimetres (0.3–0.5 in) long and 1.0–1.3 millimetres (0.04–0.05 in) wide. The six petals are dark blue, fading to white with age and the central anthers are yellow, turning orange-red with age. Flowers appear from June to October.

In 1840, Robert Marnock described this species as:

Undoubtedly one of the most beautiful of the floral productions of the South-Western Coast of Australia. Sir William Hooker says, 'We figure it on account of its great beauty, a beauty which is scarcely altered by drying, for the form and colour of both leaves and flowers is truly of that kind called everlasting; and partly with the hope that our cultivators may be induced to import this lovely plant as an ornament to our greenhouses. Nothing can exceed the richness of the bright purple perianths and the contrasting deep orange-coloured anthers. It grows in sandy soil among shrubs.

John Lindley also remarked on the beauty of this species: "In the first place there is that most beautiful plant Calectasia cyanea, R.Br., a bush like an Adansonia, with quantities of large blue flowers with deep orange-coloured anthers; this is the handsomest Endogen in the Colony."

== Taxonomy and naming ==
Calectasia cyanea is one of eleven species in the genus Calectasia. It was first described by Robert Brown in Prodromus Florae Novae Hollandiae in 1810. The specific epithet (cyanea) is from the Ancient Greek κύανος (kyanós) meaning "dark blue" referring to the flower colour. Common names include blue tinsel lily and star of Bethlehem.

== Distribution and habitat ==
The Star of Bethlehem has a very restricted distribution in the Torndirrup National Park and Albany regions of the South West Botanical Province. Old records show it as being common in the region of King George Sound but much of this area is now urbanised as the city of Albany or devoted to agriculture. It grows in yellow sand over laterite. The total population was estimated at around 70 plants in 2005 in an area around 0.02 square kilometres.

== Conservation status ==
Calectasia cyanea is classified as Critically endangered by the Department of the Environment and Water Resources and the Department of the Environment, Canberra. It is vulnerable to, and threatened by, dieback (Phytophthora cinnamomi) and grazing by the western grey kangaroo.
