= Dasypogon hookeri =

Scientific classification
- Kingdom: Plantae
- Clade: Tracheophytes
- Clade: Angiosperms
- Clade: Monocots
- Clade: Commelinids
- Order: Arecales
- Family: Dasypogonaceae
- Genus: Dasypogon
- Species: D. hookeri

Binomial name
- Dasypogon hookeri J.Drumm.

Species of flowering plant

Dasypogon hookeri, commonly known as pineapple bush, is a species of shrub in the family Dasypogonaceae native to Western Australia.
