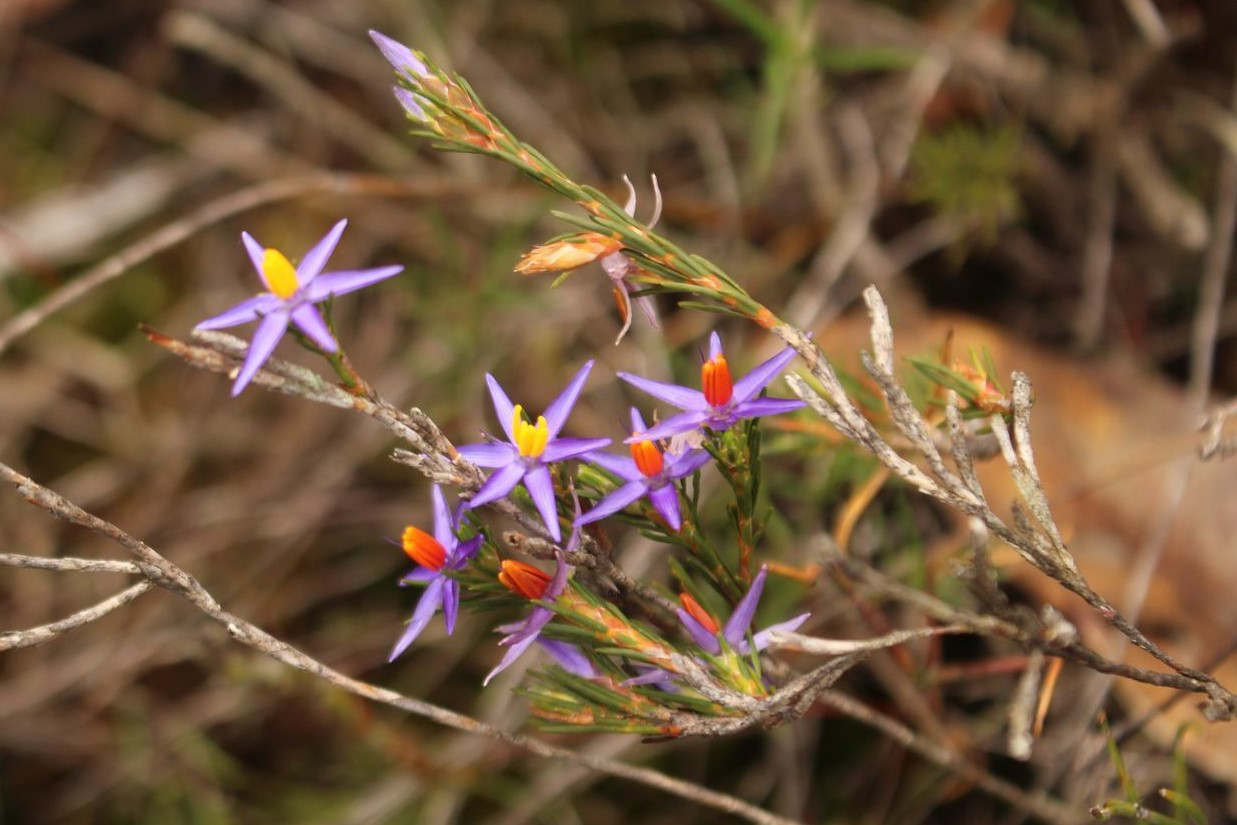

Scientific classification
- Kingdom: Plantae
- Clade: Tracheophytes
- Clade: Angiosperms
- Clade: Monocots
- Clade: Commelinids
- Order: Arecales
- Family: Dasypogonaceae
- Genus: Calectasia
- Species: C. gracilis

Binomial name
- Calectasia gracilis Keighery
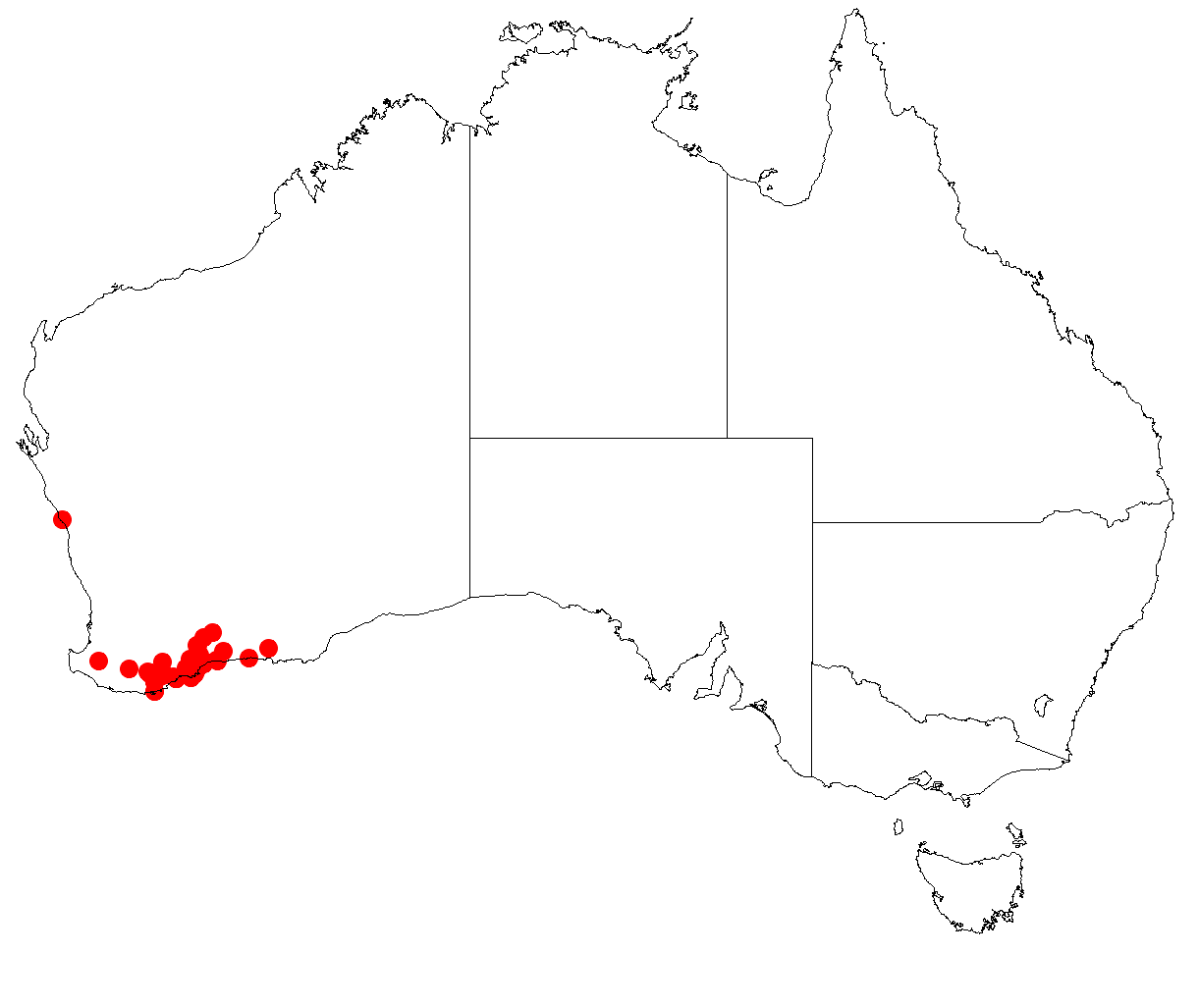
- Occurrence data from AVH

= Calectasia gracilis =

Species of flowering plant

Calectasia gracilis, commonly known as blue tinsel lily, is a species of plant in the family Dasypogonaceae and is endemic to the south-west of Western Australia. It is a spreading, tufted, woody, perennial herb with blue petals and six yellow stamens that turn orange-red as they age. It is similar to the other species of Calectasia and has only been recognised as a separate species since a review of the genus in 2001.

== Description ==
Calectasia gracilis is an undershrub with stilt roots but without a rhizome. It grows to a height of 20–45 cm (8–20 in) with a few short side branches. The leaves are glabrous, 5.4–7.2 mm (0.2–0.3 in) long and about 0.5 mm (0.02 in) with a short, sharp point on the end. The base of the petals (strictly tepals) forms a tube 5.7–6.9 mm (0.2–0.3 in) long with lobes 8–9.5 mm (0.3–0.4 in) long and 2–3 mm (0.08–0.1 in) wide forming a blue, papery star-like pattern which fades to pale blue with age. In the centre of the star are six yellow stamens which turn orange-red with age. The style is 6.2–7.2 mm (0.2–0.3 in) long and extends beyond the stamens. Flowers appear from August to October.

== Taxonomy and naming ==
Calectasia gracilis is one of eleven species in the genus Calectasia. It was first formally described in 2001 by Gregory John Keighery from a specimen collected near Cape Riche by Russell Barrett and Kingsley Dixon. The specific epithet (gracilis) is from the Latin gracilis meaning "slender".

== Distribution and habitat ==
This species of blue tinsel lily occurs from Albany and Stirling Range National Park east to Hopetoun. It is scattered in the Stirling Range, Fitzgerald River and Frank Hann national parks, growing on quartzite sands, in mallee woodland or heath often over laterite or granite.

== Conservation status ==
Calectasia gracilis is uncommon but widespread and is classified as not threatened by the Western Australian Government Department of Parks and Wildlife.
