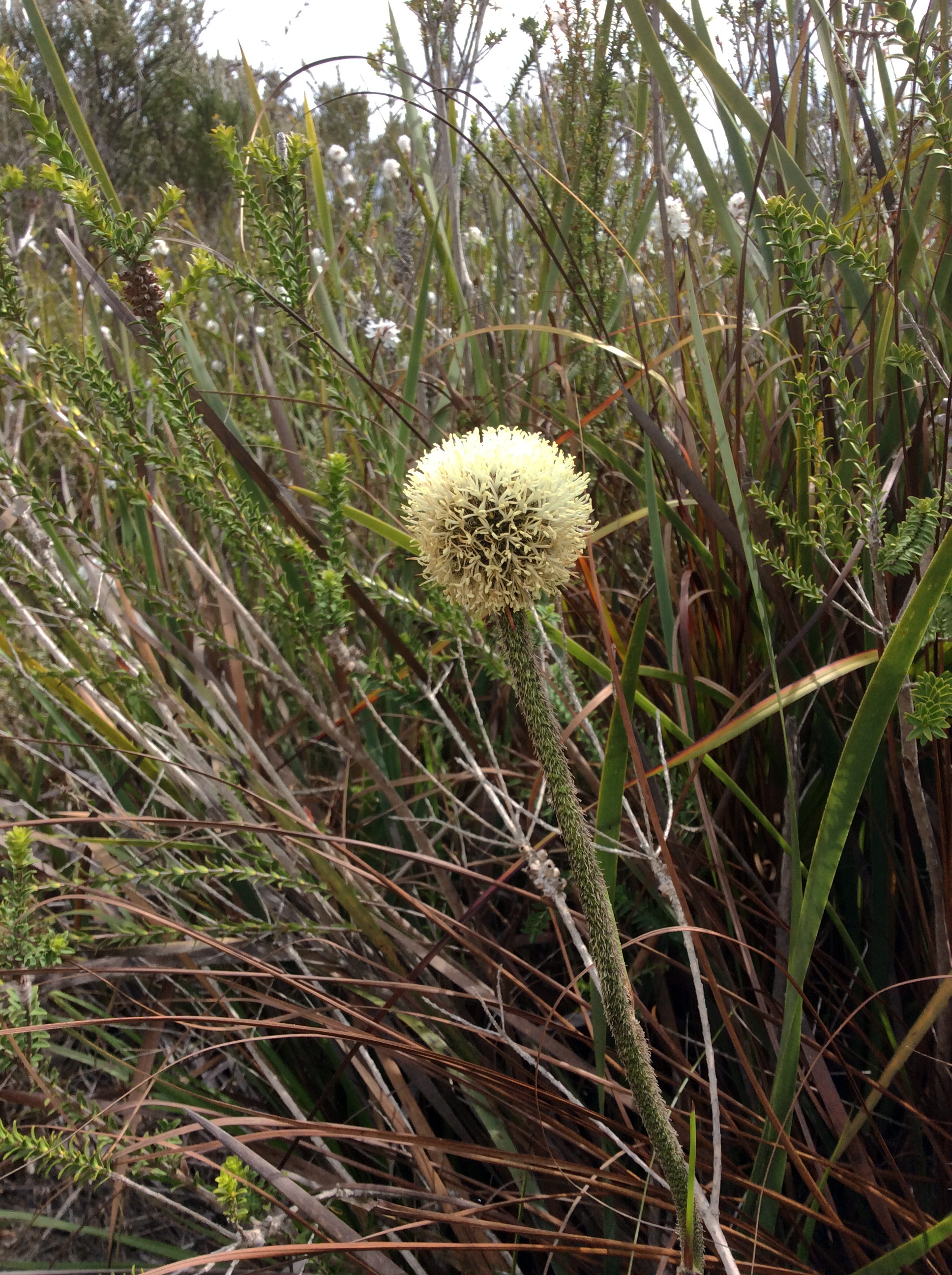

Scientific classification
- Kingdom: Plantae
- Clade: Tracheophytes
- Clade: Angiosperms
- Clade: Monocots
- Clade: Commelinids
- Order: Arecales
- Family: Dasypogonaceae
- Genus: Dasypogon
- Species: D. bromeliifolius

Binomial name
- Dasypogon bromeliifolius R.Br.
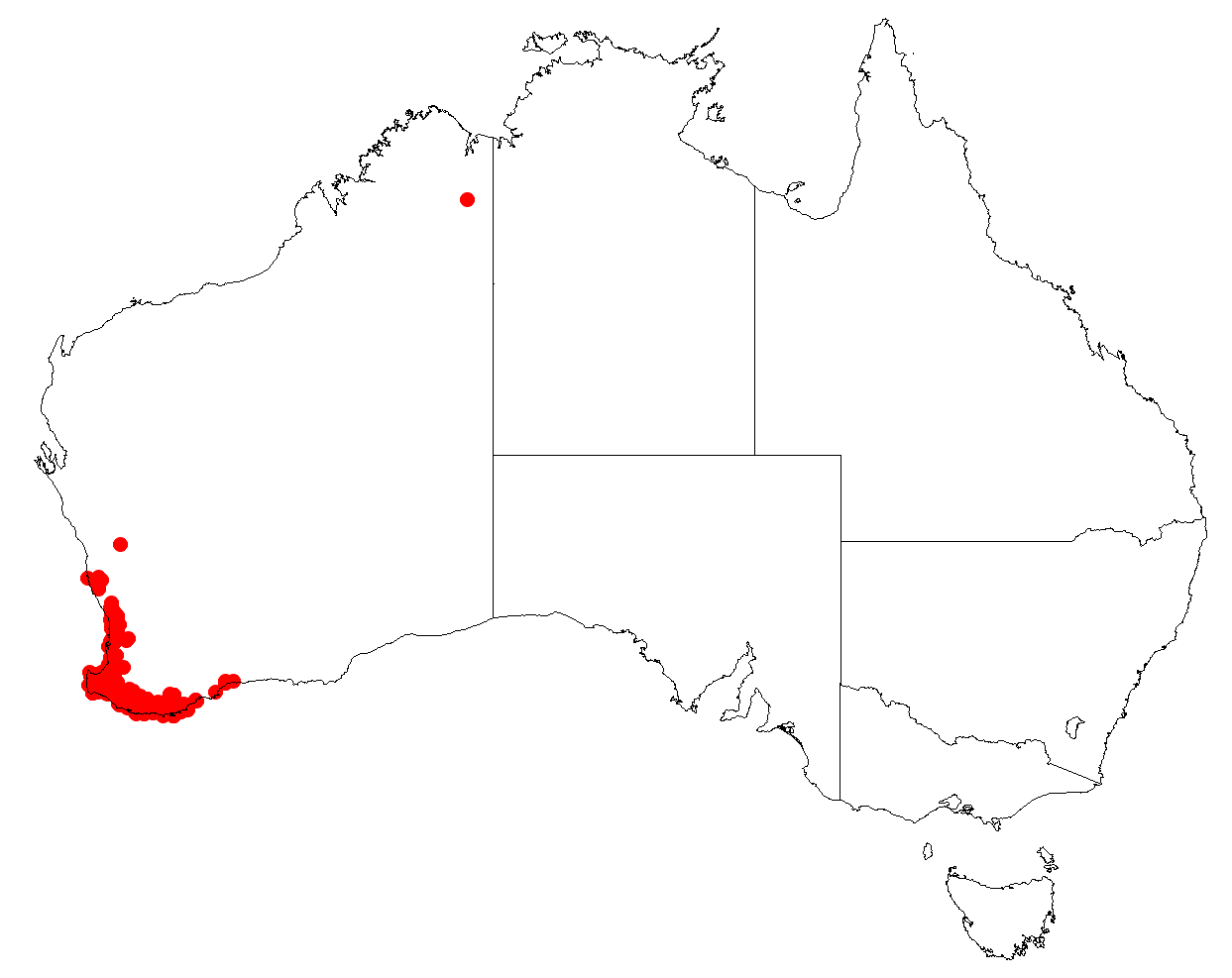
- Occurrence data from AVH

= Dasypogon bromeliifolius =

Species of flowering plant

Dasypogon bromeliifolius, commonly known as pineapple bush, is a species of shrub in the family Dasypogonaceae native to Western Australia.

== Taxonomy ==
D. bromeliifolius was first described by Robert Brown in 1810. The type specimen, BM000939359, was collected by Robert Brown in 1801/1802 at King George's Sound and is held at the British Museum.
