= Calectasia elegans =

Scientific classification
- Kingdom: Plantae
- Clade: Embryophytes
- Clade: Tracheophytes
- Clade: Spermatophytes
- Clade: Angiosperms
- Clade: Monocots
- Clade: Commelinids
- Order: Arecales
- Family: Dasypogonaceae
- Genus: Calectasia
- Species: C. elegans

Binomial name
- Calectasia elegans R.L.Barrett, 2015

Species of palm

Calectasia elegans, the elegant tinsel lily, is a species of flowering plants in the family Dasypogonaceae. It is found in Western Australia.
