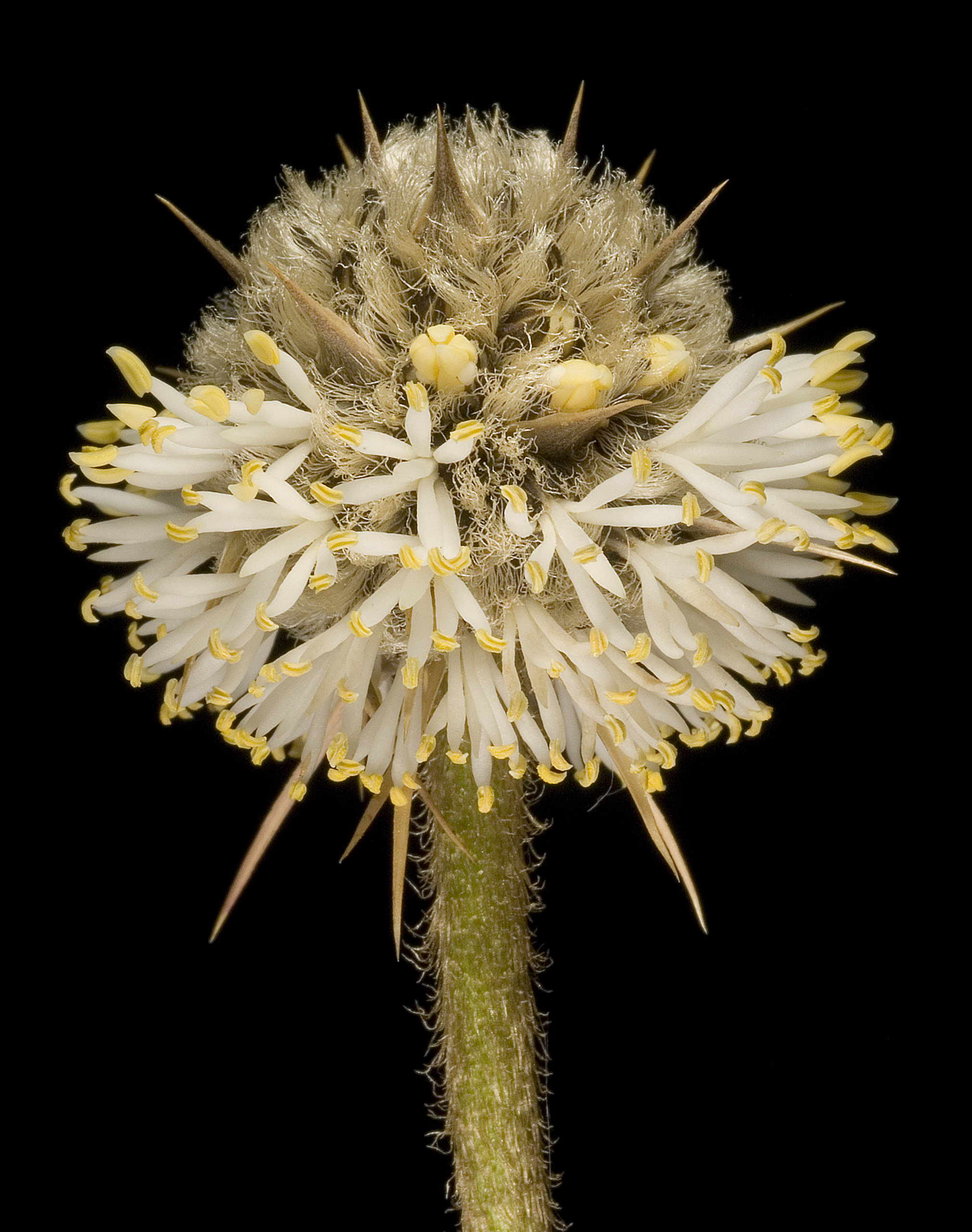

Scientific classification
- Kingdom: Plantae
- Clade: Tracheophytes
- Clade: Angiosperms
- Clade: Monocots
- Clade: Commelinids
- Order: Arecales
- Family: Dasypogonaceae
- Genus: Dasypogon
- Species: D. obliquifolius

Binomial name
- Dasypogon obliquifolius Nees

= Dasypogon obliquifolius =

Species of flowering plant

Dasypogon obliquifolius is a species of shrub in the family Dasypogonaceae native to Western Australia.
