= Calectasia keigheryi =

Conservation status
- Priority Two — Poorly Known Taxa (DEC)

Scientific classification
- Kingdom: Plantae
- Clade: Tracheophytes
- Clade: Angiosperms
- Clade: Monocots
- Clade: Commelinids
- Order: Arecales
- Family: Dasypogonaceae
- Genus: Calectasia
- Species: C. keigheryi

Binomial name
- Calectasia keigheryi R.L.Barrett & K.W.Dixon

Species of flowering plant

Calectasia keigheryi, commonly known as blue tinsel lily, is a plant in the family Dasypogonaceae growing as an erect, rhizomatous, perennial herb. It is an uncommon species, endemic and restricted to a few areas in the south-west of Western Australia. It is similar to the other species of Calectasia and has only been recognised as a separate species since a review of the genus in 2001. It is relatively easily distinguished from the others mainly by its smaller flowers, unusual anther shape, and hairs on the lower part of the petals.

== Description ==
Calectasia keigheryi is an undershrub without stilt roots but with a short rhizome from which clones are produced. It grows to a height of about 40 cm with a few short side branches. Each leaf blade is glabrous, 6.8–12.3 x 0.5–0.8 mm tapering to a short, sharp point on the end. The base of the petals (strictly tepals) form a tube 9.3–9.8 mm long. Unlike any of the other Western Australian Calectasia species, the lower third of this tube is gold-coloured and lined with soft, white-golden hairs. The upper part of the petals spread outwards to form a blue, papery star-like pattern fading to white or occasionally red with age. In the centre of the star are six yellow stamens forming a tube which does not change colour with age. The terminal part of the stamen, the anther, is unusual in the genus in having a short skirt. The thin style extends beyond the stamens. Flowers appear from July to September.

== Taxonomy and naming ==
Calectasia keigheryi is one of eleven species in the genus Calectasia. It was described as a new species in 2001 by R.L.Barrett & K.W.Dixon from a specimen collected on the eastern edge of Fitzgerald River National Park. The specific epithet (keigheryi) "honours botanist Greg Keighery who has made extensive contributions to the taxonomy, biology and conservation of the flora of Western Australia, including Calectasia''.

== Distribution and habitat ==
This species of blue tinsel lily is uncommon and known in only three locations in the Fitzgerald River National Park in the Esperance Plains biogeographic region of south-west Western Australia. It grows in grey sand or shallow sandy loam over laterite, in low heath.

== Conservation status ==
Calectasia keigheryi is classified "Priority Two" by the Western Australian government Department of Parks and Wildlife meaning that is poorly known and from one or a few locations.
