= Calectasia browneana =

Conservation status
- Priority Two — Poorly Known Taxa (DEC)

Scientific classification
- Kingdom: Plantae
- Clade: Tracheophytes
- Clade: Angiosperms
- Clade: Monocots
- Clade: Commelinids
- Order: Arecales
- Family: Dasypogonaceae
- Genus: Calectasia
- Species: C. browneana

Binomial name
- Calectasia browneana Keighery, K.W.Dixon & R.L.Barrett

Species of flowering plant

Calectasia browneana, commonly known as blue tinsel lily, is a plant in the family Dasypogonaceae growing as a spreading, perennial, tufted herb. It is an uncommon species, endemic and restricted to a few areas in the south-west of Western Australia. It is similar to the other species of Calectasia and has only been recognised as a separate species since a review of the genus in 2001. It is distinguished from the others mainly by the hairiness of its leaves and lack of a rhizome.

== Description ==
Calectasia browneana is an undershrub with stilt roots but without a rhizome. It grows to a height of about 60 cm with many very short side branches. Each leaf blade is 8.3–15.2 x 0.2–0.4 mm tapering to a short, sharp point on the end and densely covered with fine hairs. The base of the petals (strictly tepals) form a tube 7.2–8.0 mm long, while the outer parts spread outwards to form a pale blue-pink, papery star-like pattern. In the centre of the star are six yellow stamens forming a tube which turns orange-red with age. The thin style extends beyond the stamens. Flowers appear from June to August.

== Taxonomy and naming ==
Calectasia browneana is one of eleven species in the genus Calectasia. It was described as a new species in 2001 by K.W. Dixon and R.L. Barrett from a specimen collected on the Coorow-Greenhead Road. The specific epithet (browneana) refers to the owners of a property where the species is found and "who have endeavoured to conserve high conservation value kwongan vegetation on their land".

== Distribution and habitat ==
This species of blue tinsel lily is uncommon and found in only two, separate areas of the south-west of Western Australia - the Coorow-Eneabba region and near Kalbarri. It grows in white-grey sand over laterite in kwongan vegetation.

== Conservation status ==
Calectasia browneana is classified as "Priority Two" by the Western Australian government Department of Parks and Wildlife meaning that is poorly known and from one or a few locations.
