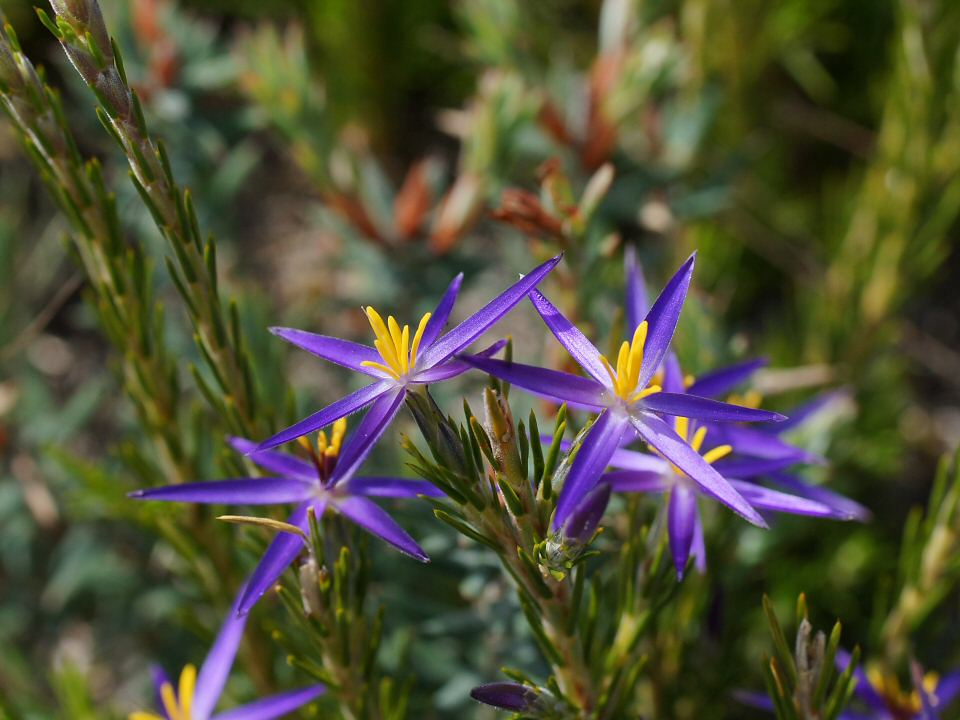
- Calectasia intermedia

Scientific classification
- Kingdom: Plantae
- Clade: Tracheophytes
- Clade: Angiosperms
- Clade: Monocots
- Clade: Commelinids
- Order: Arecales
- Family: Dasypogonaceae
- Genus: Calectasia; R.Br.

Synonyms
- Scaryomyrtus F.Muell.

= Calectasia =

Genus of flowering plants

Calectasia is a genus of about fifteen species of flowering plants in the family Dasypogonaceae and is endemic to south-western Australia. Plants is this genus are small, erect shrubs with branched stems covered by leaf sheaths. The flowers are star-shaped, lilac-blue to purple and arranged singly on the ends of short branchlets.

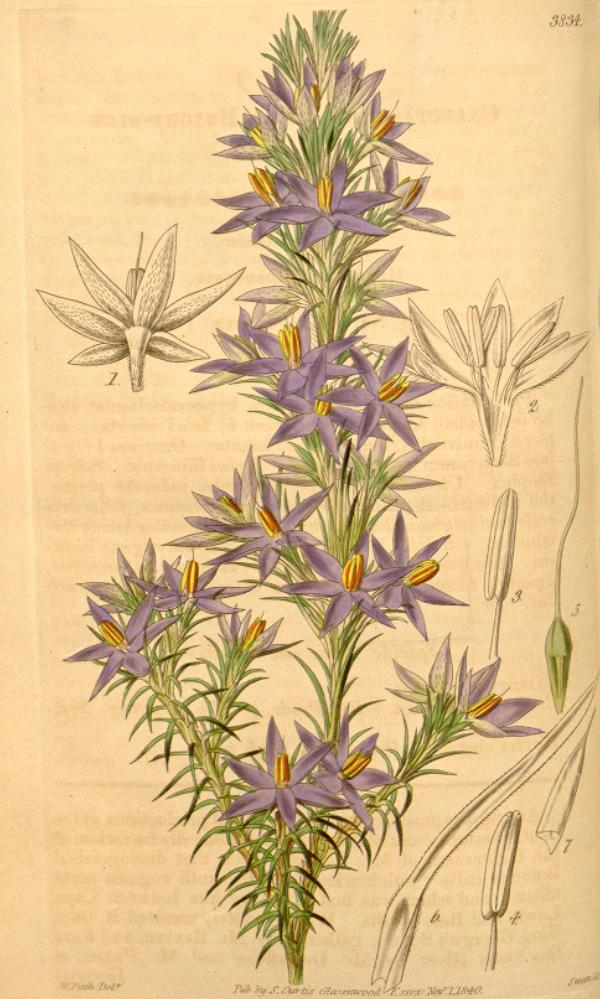
Illustration of Calectasia cyanea from Curtis's Botanical Magazine

== Description ==
Plants in the genus Calectasia are small, often rhizome-forming shrubs with erect, branched stems with sessile leaves arranged alternately along the stems, 5–17 mm (0.20–0.67 in) long and about 0.5 mm (0.020 in) wide, the base held closely against the stem and the tip pointed. The flowers are arranged singly on the ends of branchlets and are bisexual, the three sepals and three petals are similar to each other, and joined at the base forming a short tube but spreading, forming a star-like pattern with a metallic sheen. Six bright yellow or orange stamens form a tube in the centre of the flower with a thin style extending beyond the centre of the tube.

== Taxonomy ==
The genus Calectasia was first formally described in 1810 by Robert Brown in his Prodromus Florae Novae Hollandiae et Insulae Van Diemen and the first species to be named was Calectasia cyanea. The name is derived from the Ancient Greek words kalos " beautiful" and ektasis "development", alluding to the blue spreading perianth-tubes.

Ludwig Preiss described C. grandiflora in 1846 and Otto Wilhelm Sonder added C. intermedia in 1856. In 2001, Barrett and Dixon reviewed the genus and added eight new species and in 2015 four more species were added making a total of 15.

== Distribution and habitat ==
Calectasia species occur in the south-west of Western Australia and in the border areas between South Australia and Victoria. C. intermedia is only found in the latter region and the remaining species only in Western Australia. They occupy a variety of habitats, occasionally in seasonally swampy areas, but more usually in low heath or woodland on sand, or over laterite or granite.

== Ecology ==
There is evidence that all Calectasia species have sand-binding roots and flowers that are buzz pollinated. It is possible that the similarity in appearance of Calectasia and Thelymitra variegata flowers indicate an example of Dodsonian mimicry. Calectasia grandiflora and Thelymitra variegata often occur in the same area. Individual Calectasia plants are often parasitised by a dodder-like plant in the genus Cassytha.

Some species of Calectasia form specialised roots called stilt roots and can only regenerate from seed whilst others have tubers and can resprout from these. All stilt-rooted species are thought to be killed by fire and need up to five years without fire to flower and set seed.

== Species list ==
The following is a list of Calectasia species accepted by the Australian Plant Census as of October 2021:

- Calectasia browneana Keighery, K.W.Dixon & R.L.Barrett – blue tinsel lily (W.A.)
- Calectasia cyanea R.Br. – Star of Bethlehem (W.A.)
- Calectasia demarzii R.L.Barrett – Demarz's tinsel lily (W.A.)
- Calectasia elegans R.L.Barrett – elegant tinsel lily (W.A.)
- Calectasia gracilis Keighery (W.A.)
- Calectasia grandiflora L.Preiss – blue tinsel lily (W.A.)
- Calectasia hispida R.L.Barrett & K.W.Dixon (W.A.)
- Calectasia intermedia Sond. – blue tinsel-lily, eastern tinsel lily (Vic., S.A.)
- Calectasia jubilaea R.L.Barrett – jubilee tinsel lily (W.A.)
- Calectasia keigheryi R.L.Barrett & K.W.Dixon (W.A.)
- Calectasia narragara R.L.Barrett & K.W.Dixon (W.A.)
- Calectasia obtusa R.L.Barrett & K.W.Dixon – blue tinsel lily, blunt-leaved tinsel lily (W.A.)
- Calectasia palustris R.L.Barrett & K.W.Dixon – blue tinsel lily, swamp tinsel lily (W.A.)
- Calectasia pignattiana K.W.Dixon & R.L.Barrett – stilted tinsel lily, Pignatti's star of Bethlehem (W.A.)
- Calectasia valida R.L.Barrett – robust tinsel lily (W.A.)

== See also ==
- List of plants known as lily
