= Calectasia hispida =

Scientific classification
- Kingdom: Plantae
- Clade: Tracheophytes
- Clade: Angiosperms
- Clade: Monocots
- Clade: Commelinids
- Order: Arecales
- Family: Dasypogonaceae
- Genus: Calectasia
- Species: C. hispida

Binomial name
- Calectasia hispida R.L.Barrett & K.W.Dixon
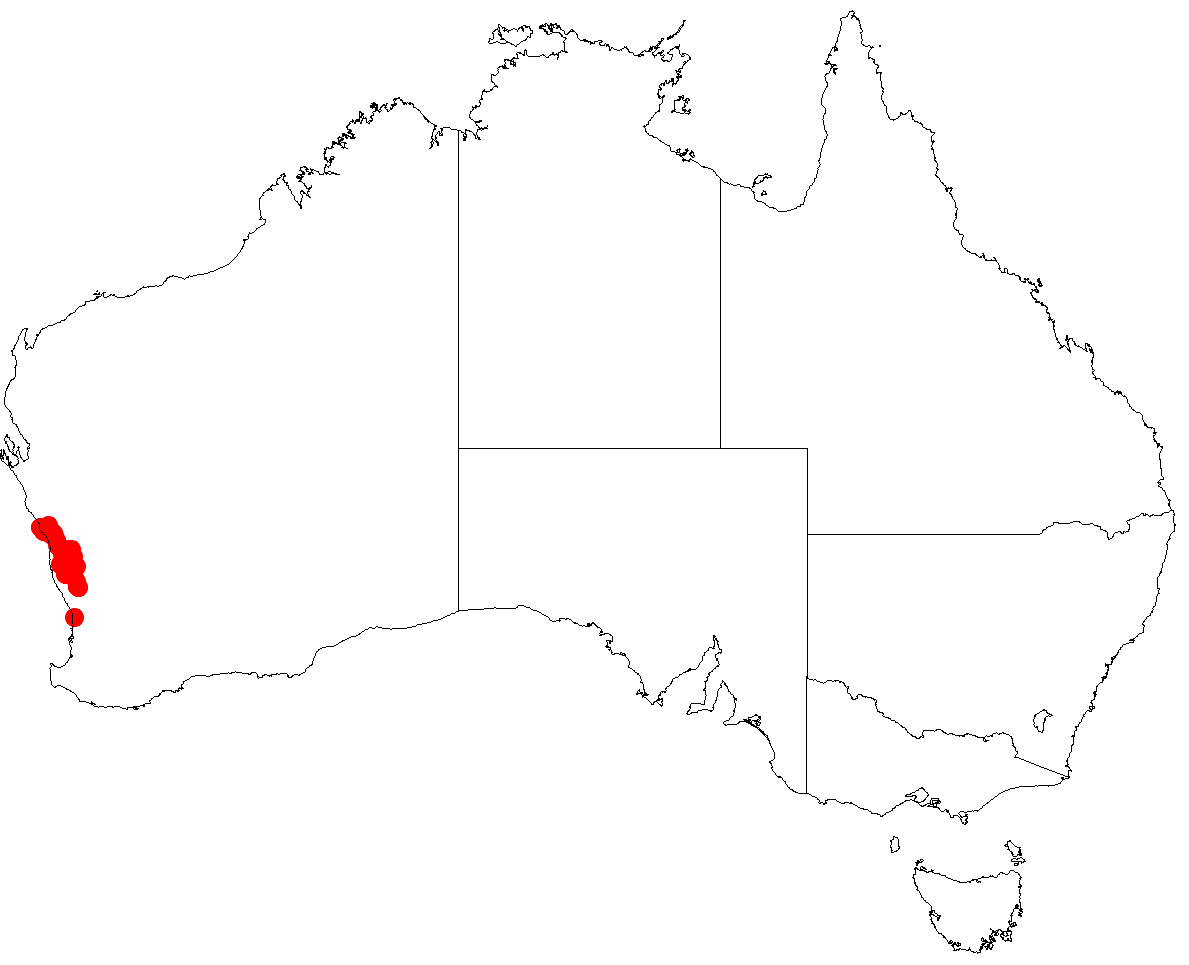
- Occurrence data from AVH

Species of flowering plant

Calectasia hispida, commonly known as blue tinsel lily or hispid tinsel lily, is a plant in the family Dasypogonaceae growing as a rhizomatous, erect, clumping perennial herb. It is endemic to the south-west of Western Australia and is common in most of its range. It is similar to the other species of Calectasia and is distinguished from them mainly by the hairiness of its leaves and the glabrousness of the throat of the flowers.

== Description ==
Calectasia hispida is an undershrub without stilt roots but with a short rhizome from which it is able to form clones. It grows to a height of about 45 cm with many very short side branches. Each leaf blade is 3.9–10.3 x 0.4–0.7 mm tapering to a short, sharp point on the end and hispid (that is, covered with rigid, bristly hairs). The base of the petals (strictly tepals) form a tube 6.8–9.0 mm long, which, unlike most others in the genus, is glabrous. The outer part of the petals spread outwards to form a blue, papery, star-like pattern which fades to pale blue with age. In the centre of the star are six yellow stamens forming a tube which turns orange-red with age. The thin style extends beyond the stamens. Flowers appear from May to June or September.

== Taxonomy and naming ==
Calectasia hispida is one of eleven species in the genus Calectasia. It was described as a new species in 2001 by R.L. Barrett and K.W. Dixon from a specimen collected on Coalara Road, 28.8 kilometres north of Watheroo Road in the Watheroo National Park. The specific epithet (hispida) refers to the hairy covering of the leaf blades.

== Distribution and habitat ==
This species of blue tinsel lily is relatively common between Gillingarra (near New Norcia) and Eneabba and common in Watheroo and Alexander Morrison national parks. It usually grows in shallow white or grey sand over laterite on kwongan slopes.

== Conservation status ==
Calectasia hispida is classified as not threatened,
