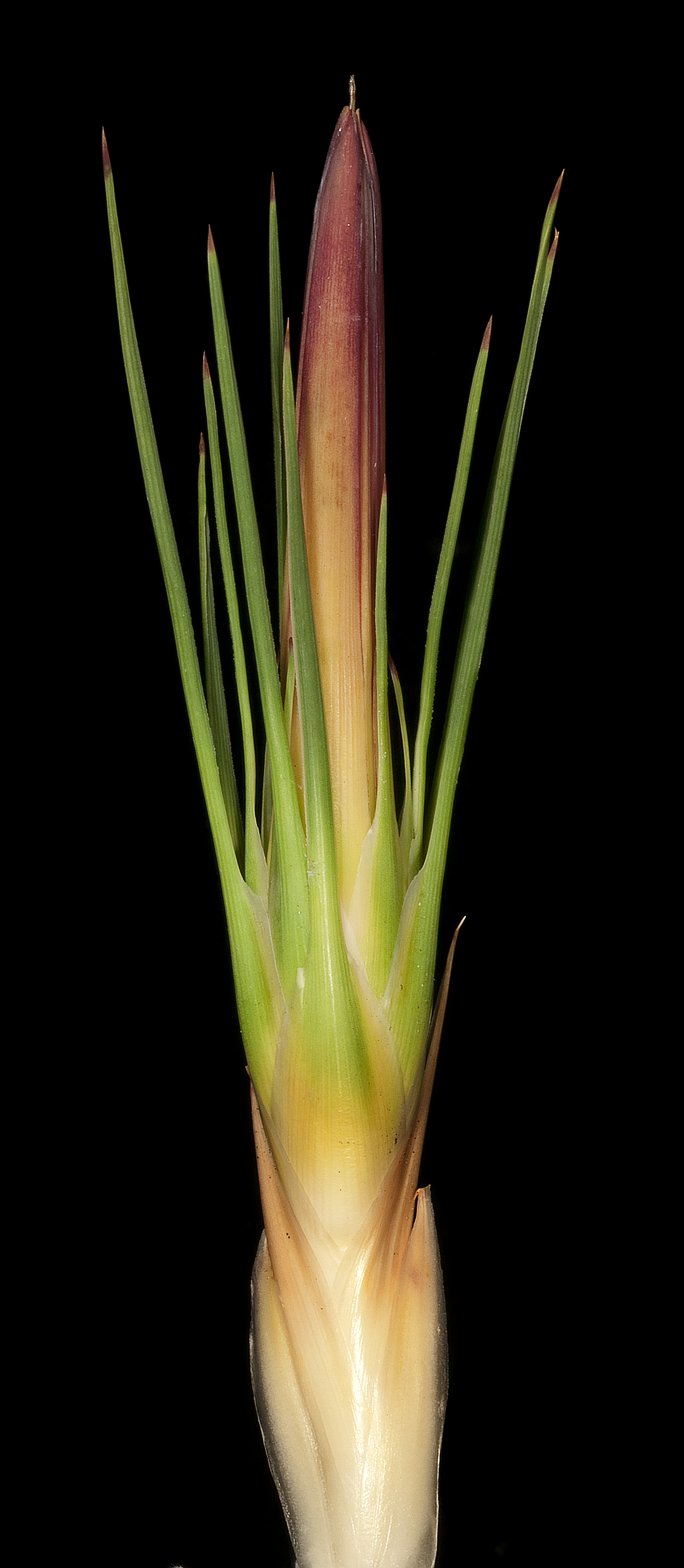
- At Gull Rock National Park

Scientific classification
- Kingdom: Plantae
- Clade: Tracheophytes
- Clade: Angiosperms
- Clade: Monocots
- Clade: Commelinids
- Order: Arecales
- Family: Dasypogonaceae
- Genus: Baxteria; R.Br. ex Hook.
- Species: B. australis

Binomial name
- Baxteria australis R.Br. ex Hook.

= Baxteria =

Genus of flowering plants

Baxteria is a genus of flowering plant in the Dasypogonaceae described as a genus in 1843. There is only one known species, Baxteria australis, found only in the southwestern part of Western Australia.
