= Sandro Pignatti =

Italian botanist (1930–2025)

Alessandro "Sandro" Pignatti (28 September 1930 – 13 June 2025) was an Italian botanist specialising in pteridophytes and spermatophytes. The Australian plant species Calectasia pignattiana was named after him. On 31 May 1991, Pignatti received an honorary doctorate from the Faculty of Mathematics and Science at Uppsala University, Sweden. He was an Honorary Member of the International Association for Vegetation Science (1997).

The specific epithet of the Western Australian plant species, Calectasia pignattiana honoured "Professors Erika and Alessandro Pignatti of Rome on the occasion of their seventieth birthdays".

Pignatti died on 13 June 2025, at the age of 94.
