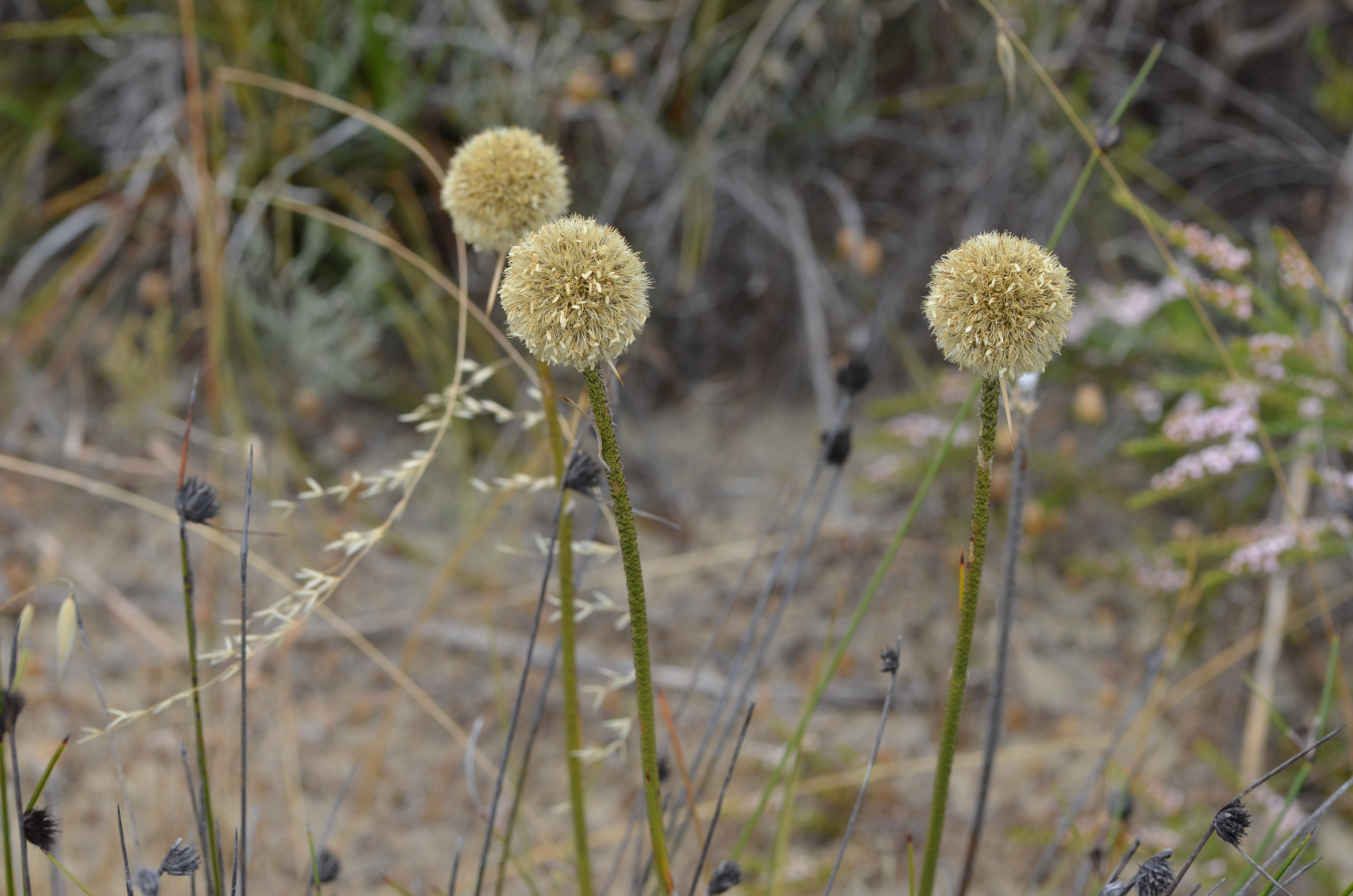
- Dasypogon bromeliifolius

Scientific classification
- Kingdom: Plantae
- Clade: Embryophytes
- Clade: Tracheophytes
- Clade: Spermatophytes
- Clade: Angiosperms
- Clade: Monocots
- Clade: Commelinids
- Order: Arecales
- Family: Dasypogonaceae
- Genus: Dasypogon; R.Br.

Species
- Dasypogon bromeliifolius R.Br. Dasypogon hookeri J.Drumm. Dasypogon obliquifolius Lehm. ex Nees

= Dasypogon =

Genus of flowering plants

Dasypogon is a genus of flowering plants in the family Dasypogonaceae. It includes three species, all endemic to Western Australia.

== Etymology ==
The name literally translates to "shaggy beard", from Ancient Greek δασύς (dasús, "hairy, shaggy, rough") + πώγων (pṓgōn, "beard").
