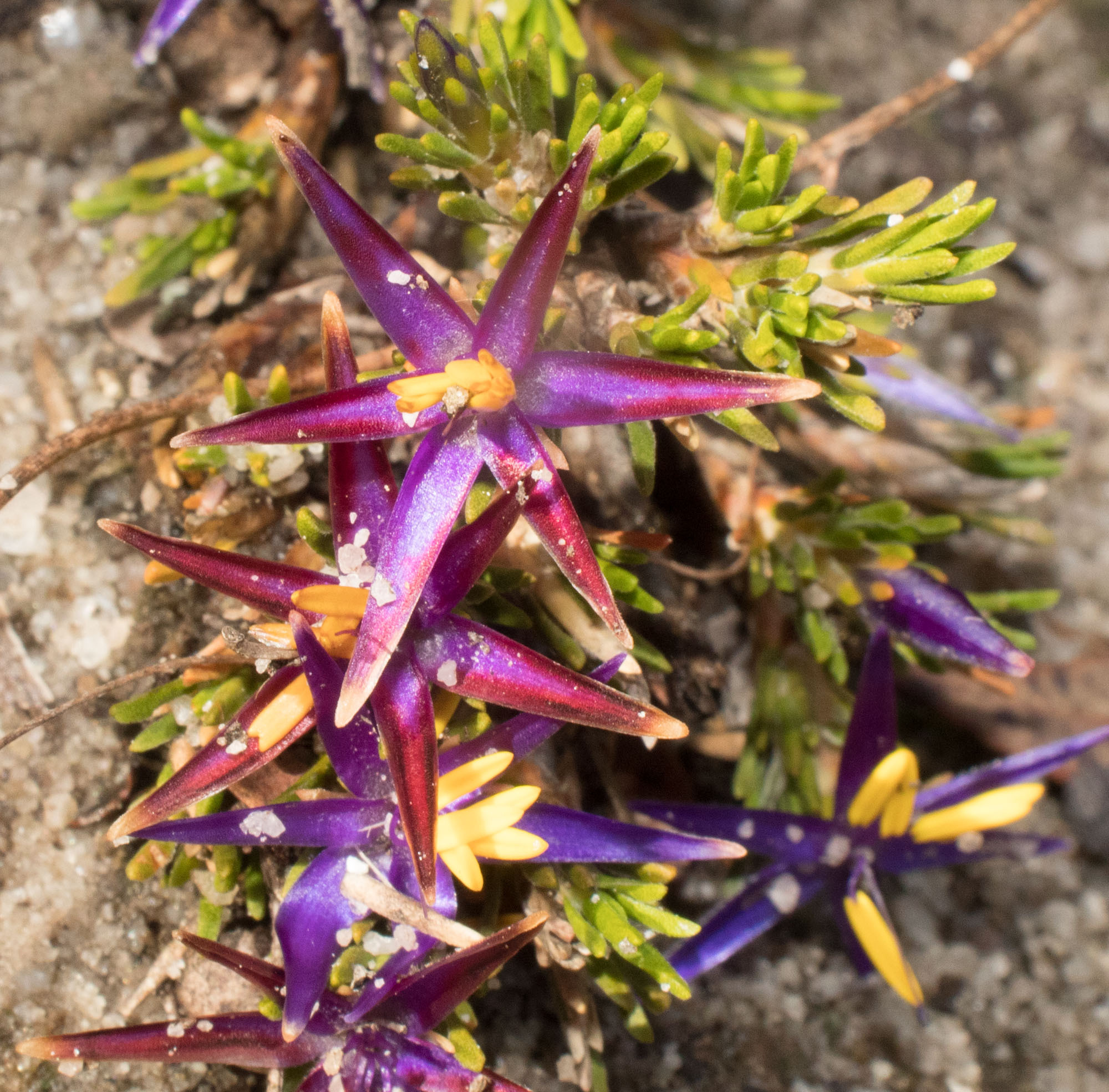

Conservation status
- Priority Three — Poorly Known Taxa (DEC)

Scientific classification
- Kingdom: Plantae
- Clade: Tracheophytes
- Clade: Angiosperms
- Clade: Monocots
- Clade: Commelinids
- Order: Arecales
- Family: Dasypogonaceae
- Genus: Calectasia
- Species: C. obtusa

Binomial name
- Calectasia obtusa R.L.Barrett & K.W.Dixon

= Calectasia obtusa =

Species of flowering plant

Calectasia obtusa, commonly known as a blue tinsel lily or blunt-leaved tinsel lily is a plant in the family Dasypogonaceae growing as an erect, small shrub with stems to 50 cm. It is endemic to the south-west of Western Australia, widespread in most of its range but only known from nine populations.

== Description ==
Calectasia obtusa is an undershrub with stilt roots 30–55 mm long but no rhizome. It grows to a height of about 50 cm with several short side branches. Each leaf blade is glabrous except at the margins, 4.5–8.5 x 0.5–0.9 mm, often pressed against the stem, the ends usually blunt and only rarely tapering to a short, sharp point. The base of the petals (strictly tepals) form a tube 7.7–8.8 mm long, while the outer part of the petals are wine red with blue margins fading to pale blue with age and spreading outwards to form a papery, star-like pattern. In the centre of the star are six yellow stamens forming a tube which does not change colour with age. The thin style extends beyond the stamens. It is similar to the other species of Calectasia and is distinguished from them mainly by the combination of the absence of a rhizome and the glabrousness and lack of a sharp point on the ends of the leaf blades. Flowers mostly appear from July to August.

== Taxonomy and naming ==
Calectasia obtusa is one of eleven species in the genus Calectasia. It was described as a new species in 2001 by R.L. Barrett and K.W. Dixon from a specimen collected near Cape Riche. is from the Latin obtusus, "obtuse" referring to the blunt tip of the leaf.

== Distribution and habitat ==
This species of tinsel lily is found in scattered populations, sometimes of only a few plants, between Kojonup and Hopetoun in the South West Botanical Province. It grows in grey clay loam in open woodland or in near-coastal areas, in low heath over laterite.

== Conservation status ==
Calectasia obtusa is classified as "Priority Three" by the Western Australian government department of parks and wildlife meaning that it is poorly known and known from only a few locations but is not under imminent threat.
