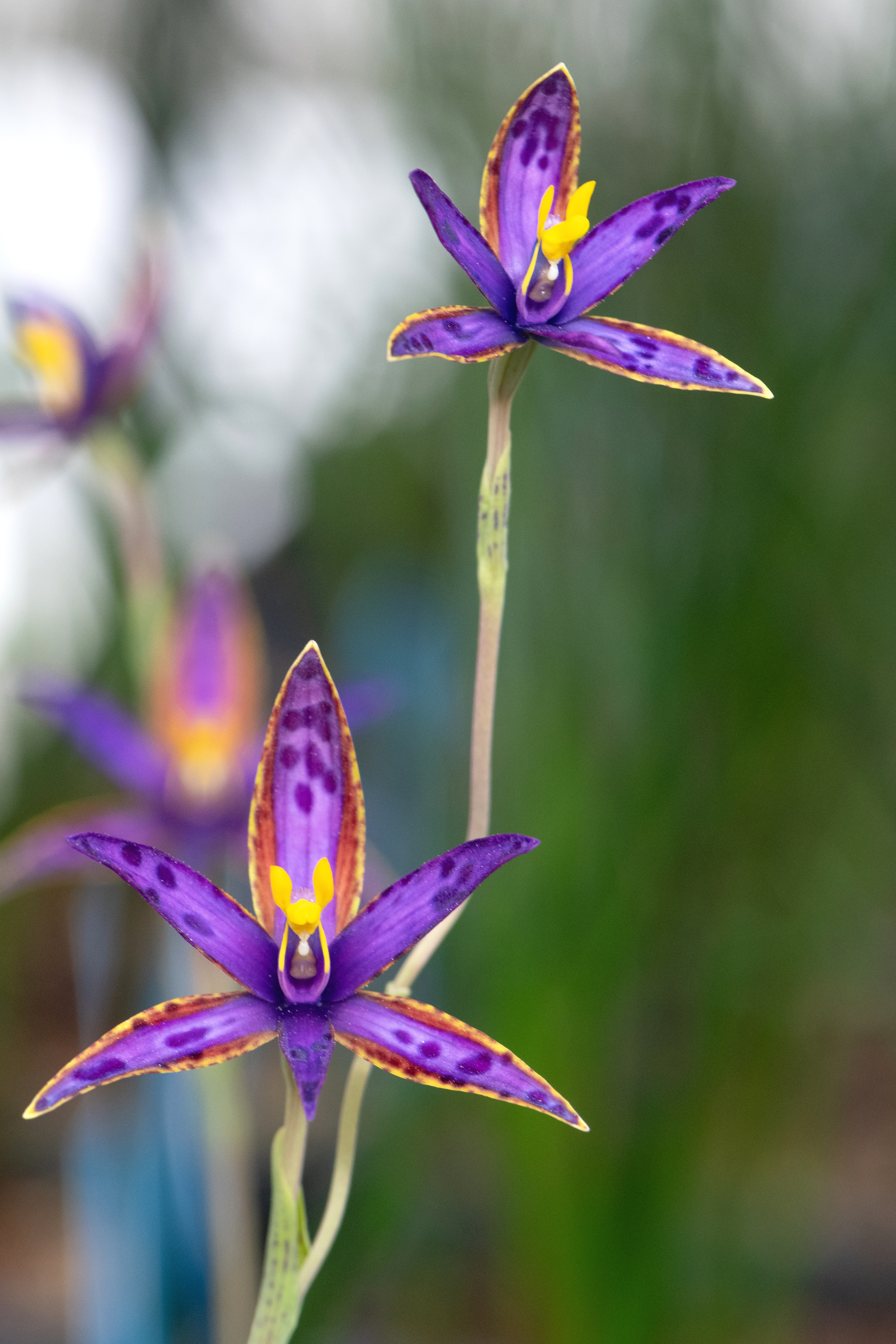
- In Royal Botanic Gardens, Cranbourne

Conservation status
- Priority Two — Poorly Known Taxa (DEC)

Scientific classification
- Kingdom: Plantae
- Clade: Embryophytes
- Clade: Tracheophytes
- Clade: Angiosperms
- Clade: Monocots
- Order: Asparagales
- Family: Orchidaceae
- Subfamily: Orchidoideae
- Tribe: Diurideae
- Genus: Thelymitra
- Species: T. variegata

Binomial name
- Thelymitra variegata (Lindl.) F.Muell.

Synonyms
- Macdonaldia variegata Lindl.; Thelymitra porphyrostica F.Muell.; Thelymitra variegata (Lindl.) F.Muell. var. variegata

= Thelymitra variegata =

Queen of Sheba

Species of orchid

Thelymitra variegata, commonly called Queen of Sheba, is a species of orchid in the family Orchidaceae and endemic to the south-west of Western Australia. It has a single erect, spiral, dark green leaf with a purplish base and up to five glossy, variegated reddish, purplish or violet flowers with darker spots and blotches and yellowish margins. There are two bright yellow or orange arms on the sides of the column.

== Description ==
Thelymitra variegata is a tuberous, perennial herb with an erect, dark green leaf which is egg-shaped near its purplish base, then suddenly narrows to a linear, channelled, spirally twisted leaf 40–100 mm (2–4 in) long and 7–12 mm (0.3–0.5 in) wide. Up to five glossy, variegated reddish, purplish or violet flowers with darker spots and blotches and yellowish margins, 30–50 mm (1.2–2.0 in) wide are borne on a flowering stem 100–350 mm (4–10 in) tall. The sepals and petals are 15–25 mm (0.6–1 in) long and 6–10 mm (0.2–0.4 in) wide. The column is a similar colour to the petals and sepals, 5–7 mm (0.2–0.3 in) long and about 2 mm (0.08 in) wide with a cluster of small finger-like glands on its back. There are two bright yellow or orange ear-like arms on the sides of the column. The flowers are insect pollinated and open widely on hot days. Flowering occurs in August and September.

== Taxonomy and naming ==
Queen of Sheba orchid was first formally described in 1840 by John Lindley who gave it the name Macdonaldia variegata and published the description in A Sketch of the Vegetation of the Swan River Colony. In 1865 Ferdinand von Mueller changed the name to Thelymitra variegata and published the change in Fragmenta phytographiae Australiae. The specific epithet (variegata) is a Latin word meaning "of different sorts, particularly colors".

== Distribution and habitat ==
Queen of Sheba grows with low shrubs and grasses in woodland, forest and heath. The flowers are insect pollinated and open on sunny days. It is found between Perth and Albany in the Geraldton Sandplains, Jarrah Forest, Mallee, Swan Coastal Plain and Warren biogeographic regions.

== Conservation ==
Thelymitra variegata is classified as "Priority Two" by the Western Australian Government Department of Parks and Wildlife meaning that it is poorly known and from only one or a few locations.
