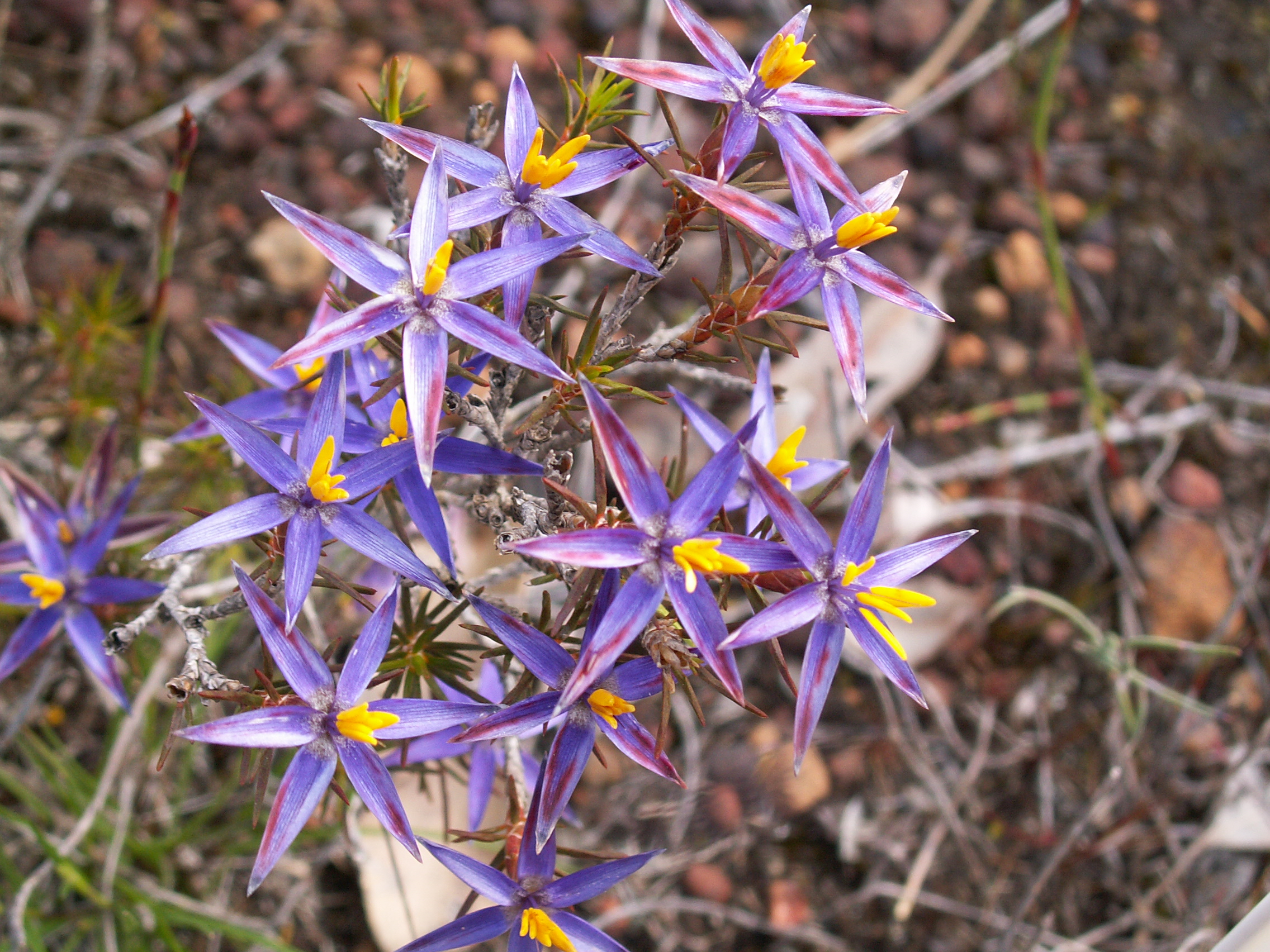
- C. grandiflora at Mount Barker.

Scientific classification
- Kingdom: Plantae
- Clade: Tracheophytes
- Clade: Angiosperms
- Clade: Monocots
- Clade: Commelinids
- Order: Arecales
- Family: Dasypogonaceae
- Genus: Calectasia
- Species: C. grandiflora

Binomial name
- Calectasia grandiflora L.Preiss
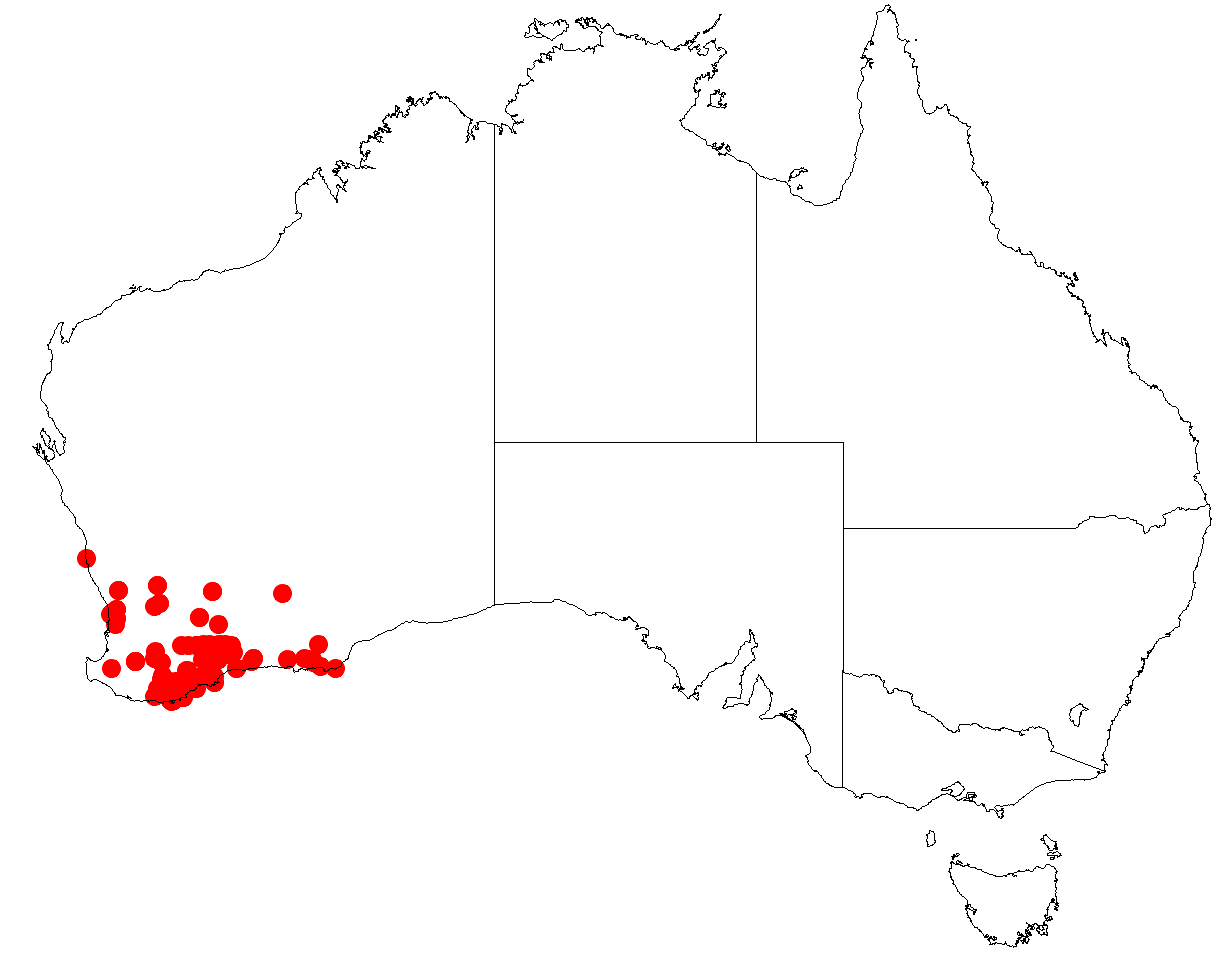
- Occurrence data from AVH

= Calectasia grandiflora =

Blue tinsel lily

Species of flowering plant

Calectasia grandiflora, commonly known as the blue tinsel lily, is a plant in the family Dasypogonaceae growing as a perennial herb endemic to the south-west of Western Australia. It flowers in spring.

== Description ==
Calectasia grandiflora is a rhizomatous perennial herb growing to a height of about 60 cm (24 in). The stems have many side branches and bear leaves 5.2–16.5 x 0.4–1.2 mm. The six petals are blue but turn red as they age; the central anthers are yellow and do not change colour as they age, unlike those of some other Calectasia species. Flowers appear from June to October (Winter and Spring) overall, though earlier in Perth than in the wheatbelt and Stirling Ranges.

== Taxonomy and naming ==
Calectasia grandiflora is one of eleven species in the genus Calectasia. It was first described by Ludwig Preiss in Plantae Preissianae in 1846. The specific epithet (grandiflorum) is from the Latin grandis = great and floris = flower referring to the flowers that are relatively large compared to those of the similar C. narragara. It is commonly called the blue tinsel lily. "Large-flowered tinsel lily" has been proposed as an alternate common name to distinguish it from other members of the genus.

== Distribution and habitat ==
Blue tinsel lily grows on sand, sandy clay, gravel, laterite and granite in swampy areas and on rock outcrops, flats, slopes and ridges. It is endemic to the south-western corner of Western Australia, occurring in the Avon Wheatbelt, Esperance, Geraldton Sandplains, Jarrah Forest, Mallee, Swan Coastal Plain and Warren biogeographic regions.

== Conservation status ==
Calectasia grandiflora is not threatened at present.
