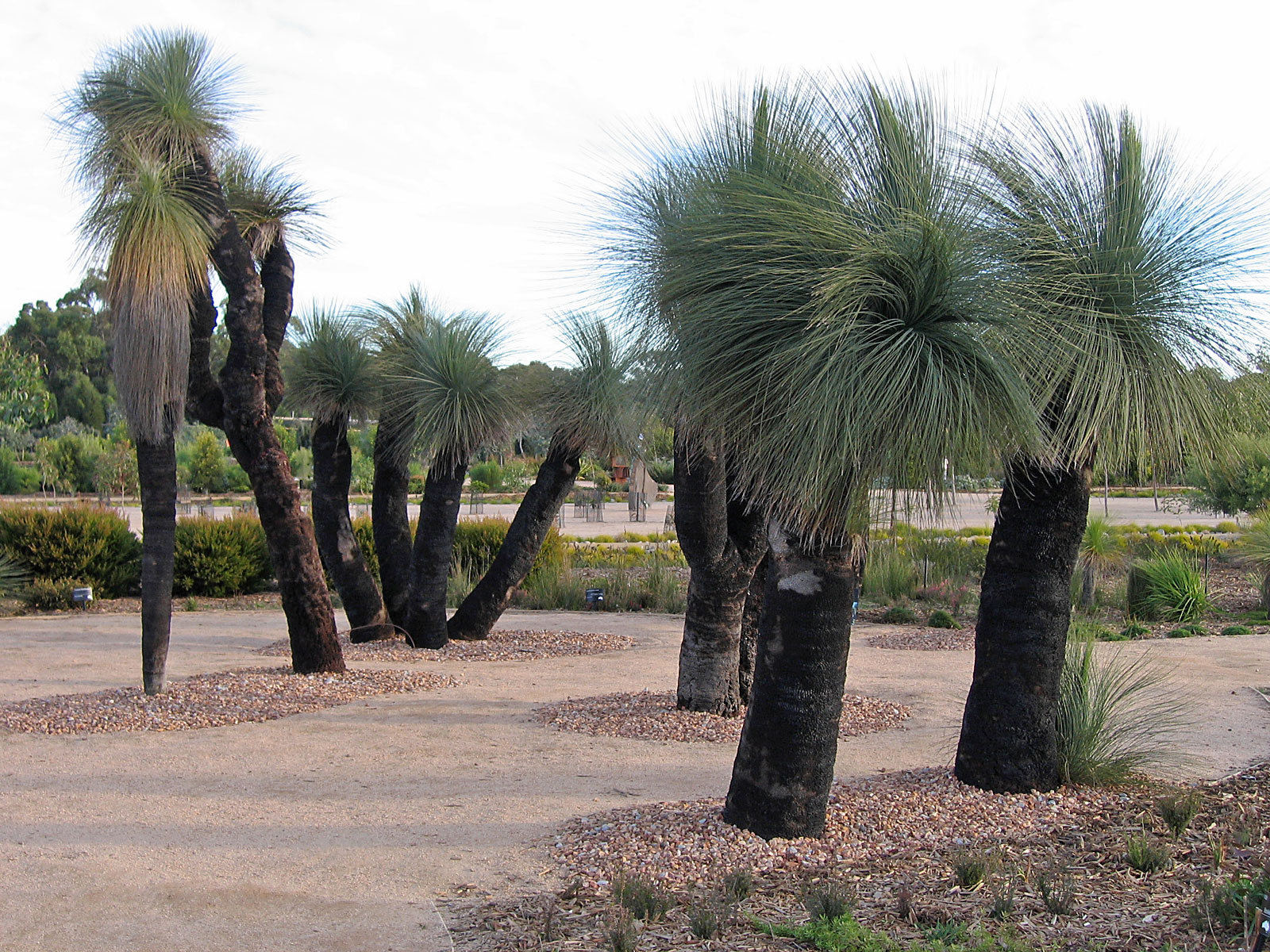
- Kingia australis in the Royal Botanic Gardens, Cranbourne

Scientific classification
- Kingdom: Plantae
- Clade: Embryophytes
- Clade: Tracheophytes
- Clade: Spermatophytes
- Clade: Angiosperms
- Clade: Monocots
- Clade: Commelinids
- Order: Arecales
- Family: Dasypogonaceae; Dumort.

Genera
- Baxteria R. Br.; Calectasia R. Br.; Dasypogon R. Br.; Kingia R. Br.
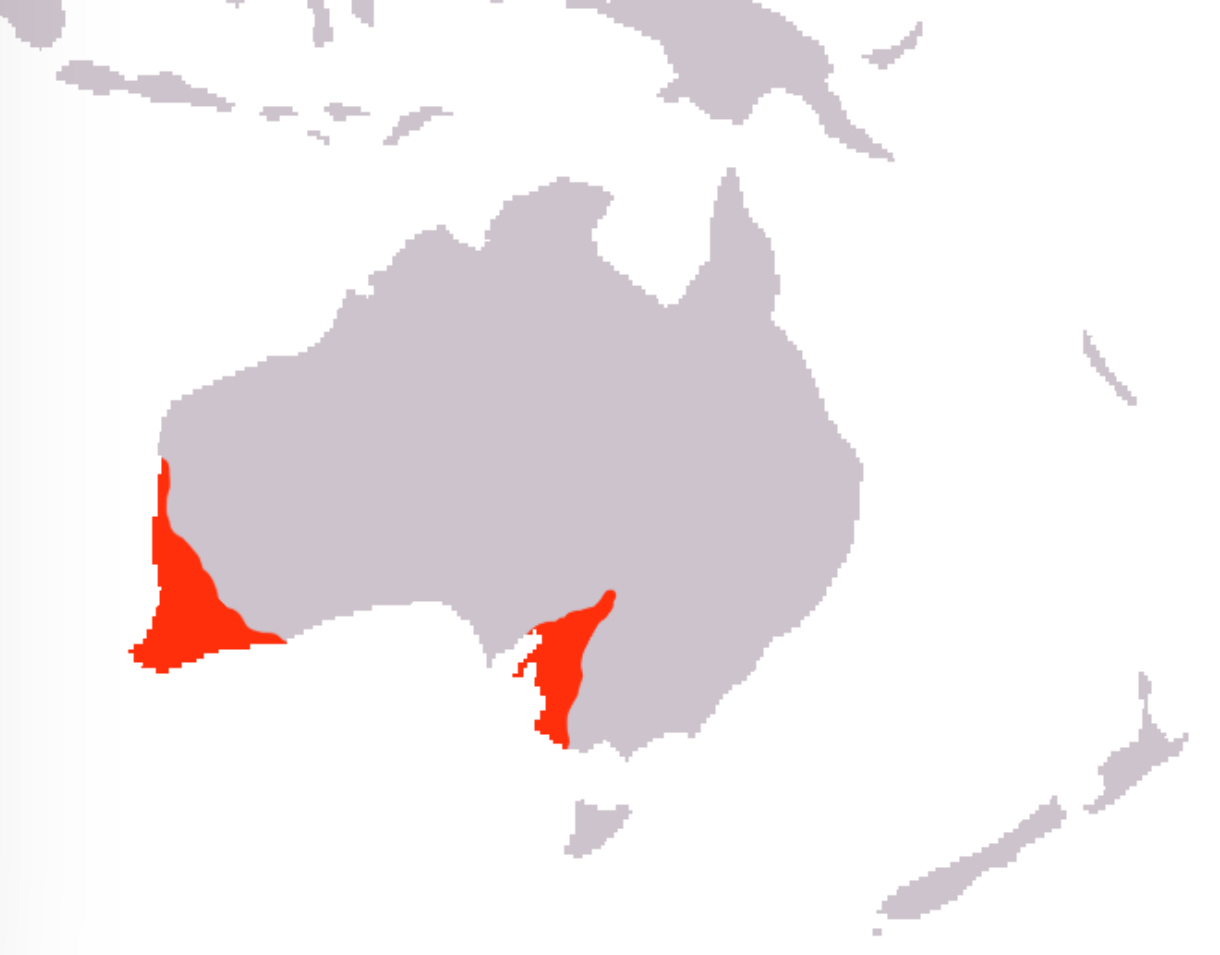

= Dasypogonaceae =

Family of flowering plants

Dasypogonaceae is a family of flowering plants based on the type genus Dasypogon, one that has traditionally not been commonly recognized by taxonomists; the plants it contains were usually included in the family Xanthorrhoeaceae. If valid, Dasypogonaceae includes four genera with 16 species. The family is endemic to Australia. The best known representative is Kingia australis.

The 2016 APG IV system places the family in the order Arecales, after several studies revealed the family as a sister taxon to Arecaceae, the palm family. Other authors find that the placement of Dasypogonaceae remains undetermined, due to conflicting models, and leave it in an order of its own, the Dasypogonales.

The earlier APG III (2009), APG II (2003), and the 1998 APG system all accepted the validity of the family, assigning it to the clade commelinids, but leaving it unplaced as to order. The commelinids are monocots, the broad group to which, in any event, these plants clearly belong.

== Phylogeny ==
Studies have confirmed the monophyletic character of the grouping. The following is a phylogenetic tree of the family.

- Dasypogonaceae
  - - Calectasia
    - Dasypogon
  - - Baxteria
    - Kingia
