= List of commelinid families =

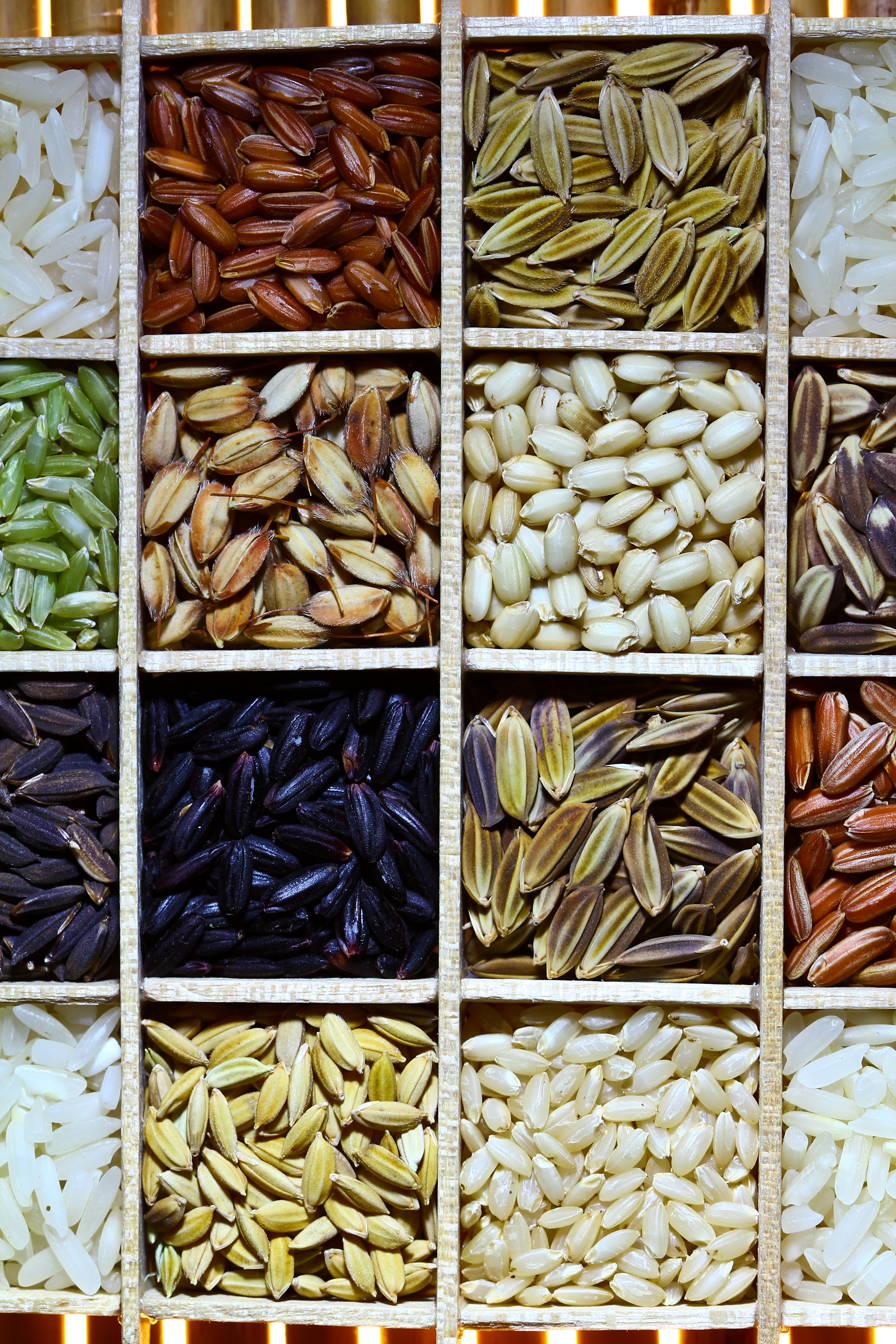
Rice seeds

The commelinids are a group of 29 interrelated families of flowering plants, named for one of the four included orders, Commelinales. (Note: The taxonomy (classification) in this list follows Plants of the World (2017) and the fourth Angiosperm Phylogeny Group system. Total counts of genera for each family come from Plants of the World Online. (See the POWO license.) Extinct taxa are not included. The commelinids form a clade, that is, a subgroup consisting of all the descendants of a theoretical ancient ancestor.) This subgroup of the monocots accounts for most of the global agricultural output; the grass family alone contains the major cereal grains (including rice, wheat, and maize or corn), along with forage grasses, sugar cane, and bamboo. The palm, banana, ginger, pineapple and sedge families are also commelinids.

Traits common to most commelinids include partially fluorescent cell walls, starchy seeds and an extra layer of epidermal wax. Like other monocots, they usually have a single embryonic leaf (cotyledon) in their seeds, scattered vascular systems, leaves with parallel veins, flowers with parts in threes or multiples of three, and roots that can develop in more than one place along the stems. These plants are found worldwide, even in mainland Antarctica; two species of grass are the only vascular plants found there.

== Glossary ==
From the glossary of botanical terms:

- annual: a plant species that completes its life cycle within a single year or growing season
- basal: attached close to the base (of a plant or an evolutionary tree diagram)
- climber: a vine that leans on, twines around or clings to other plants for vertical support
- herbaceous: not woody; usually green and soft in texture
- perennial: not an annual or biennial
- woody: hard and lignified; not herbaceous

The APG IV system is the fourth in a series of plant taxonomies from the Angiosperm Phylogeny Group.

== Families ==
Families
Family and a common name (Note: Each family's formal name ends in the Latin suffix -aceae and is derived from the name of a genus that is or once was part of the family.)	Type genus and etymology (Note: Some plants were named for naturalists (unless otherwise noted).)	Total genera; global distribution	Description and uses	Order	Type genus images
Arecaceae (palm family)	Areca was named for a Malabar plant.	180 genera, in the tropics, the subtropics, and some temperate regions	This family includes trees, shrubs, shrublets and climbers. Leaves are often sharp and prickly. The coco-de-mer has the heaviest seed of any plant, at up to 30 kilograms (66 lb), and Corypha umbraculifera has the largest inflorescence, with up to 10 million flowers. One 2000-year-old date palm seed has been germinated successfully.	Arecales	Areca catechu Areca catechu Areca catechu
Bromeliaceae (pineapple family)	Bromelia was named for Olof Bromelius (1639–1705), a Swedish doctor and botanist.	76 genera, widespread in the tropical and warm temperate Americas	These plants mostly grow on other plants or rocks. Leaves can be multihued, and are usually long and rigid. Spanish moss was formerly an important packing material in the southern United States. Puya chilensis can be considered partly carnivorous, by virtue of its sharp-tipped leaves.	Poales	Bromelia pinguin Bromelia pinguin Bromelia pinguin
Cannaceae (canna-lily family)	Canna comes from a Greek plant name.	1 genus, in the tropics and subtropics of the Americas	These non-woody plants are tall, with many broad leaves. They are bred by horticulturists and cultivated around the world. Rhizomes of Canna discolor are a staple food in parts of Asia.	Zingiberales	Canna indica Canna indica Canna indica
Commelinaceae (spiderwort family)	Commelina was named for Jan (1629–1692) and Caspar Commelijn (1667–1734).	36 genera, throughout the tropics, and in parts of East Asia and temperate North America	These fleshy plants are non-woody perennials and annuals. Commelina communis is sometimes consumed in Asia.	Commelinales	Commelina communis Commelina communis Commelina communis
Costaceae (spiral-ginger family)	Costus comes from a Latin plant name.	8 genera, throughout the tropics	These plants are usually large perennials with showy bracts. Unlike the plants in the ginger family, these are not aromatic. Dimerocostus fruit is consumed in South America.	Zingiberales	Costus pictus Costus pictus Costus pictus
Cyperaceae (sedge family)	Cyperus comes from a Greek plant name.	94 genera, worldwide	These non-woody plants grow in soil and water. Annual species generally grow in bunches, like tufts of grass. Papyrus is still used as a paper substitute, and edible tubers of Cyperus esculentus are still cultivated, both probably since 3000 BC. Papyrus is widely considered an invasive species. Totora reeds are occasionally woven into rafts.	Poales	Cyperus esculentus Cyperus esculentus Cyperus esculentus
Dasypogonaceae (savior-grass family)	Dasypogon is from the Greek for "hairy beard".	4 genera, in Australia	These perennials can be shrubby or tree-shaped, with wide or grassy leaves. One genus, Baxteria, has a putrified smell, perhaps to facilitate pollination.	Arecales	Dasypogon bromeliifolius Dasypogon bromeliifolius Dasypogon bromeliifolius
Ecdeiocoleaceae (kwongan-rush family)	Ecdeiocolea is from the Greek for "binding sheath".	2 genera, in Western Australia	These non-woody perennials grow in tufts, similar to clumps of rushes. Leaves are little more than sheaths.	Poales	Ecdeiocolea monostachya Ecdeiocolea monostachya Ecdeiocolea monostachya
Eriocaulaceae (pipewort family)	Eriocaulon is from the Greek for "woolly stem".	7 genera, across the tropics, extending into some temperate zones worldwide	These plants are non-woody, sometimes aquatic annuals and perennials, and usually tufted. One species, Syngonanthus nitens, is used in handicrafts.	Poales	Eriocaulon decangulare Eriocaulon decangulare Eriocaulon decangulare
Flagellariaceae (whip-vine family)	Flagellaria is from the same root as flagelliform, "whip-like".	1 genus, in tropical and southern Africa, Southeast Asia, and Oceania	These non-woody rhizomatous perennials have leaves with tendrils or tendril-shaped tips. The plants are used in basket-weaving.	Poales	Flagellaria indica Flagellaria indica Flagellaria indica
Haemodoraceae (kangaroo-paw family)	Haemodorum is from the Greek for "blood gift".	15 genera, in Australia, South Africa, and the Americas	These non-woody perennials have rhizomes, bulbs or other underground organs, usually reddish or orangish. Roots of Haemodorum produce a potable red pigment.	Commelinales	Haemodorum corymbosum Haemodorum corymbosum Haemodorum corymbosum
Hanguanaceae (susum family)	Hanguana was named for an Indonesian plant.	1 genus, in Sri Lanka, Southeast Asia and Oceania	These non-woody perennials are found in humid forests and waterways. Stems of Hanguana anthelminthica are edible.	Commelinales	Hanguana malayana Hanguana malayana Hanguana malayana
Heliconiaceae (parrot-flower family)	Heliconia comes from a Latin plant name (an apparent reference to Mount Helicon).	1 genus, in the tropical Americas and Oceania	These are large non-woody evergreens with crested multihued bracts. The inflorescences are bred by horticulturists.	Zingiberales	Heliconia psittacorum Heliconia psittacorum Heliconia psittacorum
Joinvilleaceae (ohe family)	Joinvillea was named for François d'Orléans, Prince of Joinville (1818–1900).	1 genus, in Southeast Asia and Pacific islands	These large, non-woody rhizomatous plants are similar to whip vine. Stems are hollow, except at the nodes.	Poales	Joinvillea ascendens Joinvillea ascendens Joinvillea ascendens
Juncaceae (rush family)	Juncus was the Classical Latin name for this plant, from the Latin for "binding".	8 genera, worldwide, except for most of the Amazon basin	These non-woody, usually rhizomatous plants are similar to the grass and sedge families, with adaptations to wind-pollination. They are used for fodder and in woven goods; in the Andes, they are also used as fuel.	Poales	Juncus acutus Juncus acutus Juncus acutus
Lowiaceae (orchid-lily family)	Lowia, an earlier synonym for Orchidantha, was named for Hugh Lowe (1824–1905), an English colonial administrator and naturalist.	1 genus, in tropical Asia	These smooth, non-woody plants are generally found near streams in evergreen forests.	Zingiberales	Orchidantha fimbriata Orchidantha fimbriata Orchidantha fimbriata
Marantaceae (prayer-plant family)	Maranta was named for Bartolomeo Maranta (1500–1571).	29 genera, throughout the tropics, and extending a bit north and south in the Americas	These are non-woody forest-dwelling or aquatic plants, some with bamboo-like stems. The Caribbean species arrowroot is cultivated for its edible starch.	Zingiberales	Maranta arundinacea Maranta arundinacea Maranta arundinacea
Mayacaceae (bog-moss family)	Mayaca was named for a French Guianese plant.	1 genus, in the tropics of the Americas	These aquatic, largely nonvascular plants resemble clubmosses. They are mostly submerged, except for the flowers and bracts.	Poales	Mayaca fluviatilis Mayaca fluviatilis Mayaca fluviatilis leaves
Musaceae (banana family)	Musa is generally believed to come from the Arabic word for this plant, although Linnaeus gave a different origin.	3 genera, native to the Old-World tropics, and cultivated in the tropics worldwide	These very large non-woody plants have heavy leaves that are frequently torn by the wind. Bananas have been cultivated and bred for thousands of years, and are a staple food crop throughout the tropics. Musa ingens, growing over 15 metres (49 ft) tall and up to 2 metres (6 ft 7 in) in circumference, is the largest non-woody plant in the world.	Zingiberales	Musa acuminata Musa acuminata Musa acuminata
Philydraceae (frogsmouth family)	Philydrum is from the Greek for "friend of water".	3 genera, in Southeast Asia, Oceania and parts of Japan	These non-woody perennials have rhizomes and other underground organs.	Commelinales	Philydrum lanuginosum Philydrum lanuginosum Philydrum lanuginosum
Poaceae (grass family)	Poa comes from a Greek plant name.	793 genera, worldwide	These plants generally have adaptations that protect them from grazing animals, including a network of underground rhizomes and narrow leaves that grow from their base. This big family includes rice, wheat, maize or corn, most forage grasses, sugar cane, bamboo, and many other economically important plants. Bamboo stalks have been known to grow more than 2 meters (6 ft 7 in) per day. The global appearance of grasslands around 33 million years ago reduced atmospheric carbon dioxide over time and cooled the planet, largely thanks to C_{4} photosynthesis, which is efficient in hot climates. (Note: See Photosynthesis § C3 : C4 photosynthesis research for the chemistry of C_{4} photosynthesis.)	Poales	Poa pratensis Poa pratensis Poa pratensis
Pontederiaceae (water hyacinth family)	Pontederia was named for Giulio Pontedera (1688–1757).	2 genera, throughout the tropics and in parts of North America	This non-woody aquatic plant family includes submerged, floating, and emergent species, some with rhizomes. Pontederia crassipes is used for fodder, fertilizer, biofuel and water treatment, but it has become invasive in warmer climates worldwide.	Commelinales	Pontederia cordata Pontederia cordata Pontederia cordata
Rapateaceae (tow-tow family)	Rapatea was probably named for a French Guianese plant.	17 genera, mostly in tropical South America and along the West African coast	These rhizomatous non-woody perennials grow in soil, in water and on trees or other plants.	Poales	Rapatea paludosa Rapatea paludosa Rapatea paludosa
Restionaceae (fynbos family)	Restio comes from the Latin for "rope-maker".	48 genera, in southern Africa, Madagascar, Southeast Asia, South America and Oceania	These evergreen perennials are similar to rushes, with adaptations to wind-pollination. Leaves are usually just sheaths; green stems provide photosynthesis. Thamnochortus insignis is used for roofing in South Africa. Female Alexgeorgea flowers in Australia grow mostly underground, except for their tips.	Poales	Restio festuciformis Restio festuciformis Restio festuciformis
Strelitziaceae (traveller's-palm family)	Strelitzia was named for Charlotte of Mecklenburg-Strelitz (1744–1818), the wife of George III.	3 genera, in the tropics of South America; parts of South Africa and Madagascar	These non-woody evergreen perennials can be shrubby or almost tree-shaped. The bare, unbranched flower stalks of Phenakospermum can reach almost 4 metres (13 ft). Bird-of-paradise plants, Strelitzia reginae, are sold in the cut-flower market. Queen Charlotte was a supporter of the gardens at Kew, which later became the Royal Botanic Gardens.	Zingiberales	Strelitzia reginae Strelitzia reginae Strelitzia reginae
Thurniaceae (palmiet family)	Thurnia was named for Everard im Thurn (1852–1932).	2 genera, in northern South America and South Africa	These non-woody perennials are rhizomatous.	Poales	Thurnia sphaerocephala Thurnia sphaerocephala Thurnia sphaerocephala
Typhaceae (bulrush family)	Typha comes from a Greek plant name.	2 genera, worldwide	These wetlands perennials are amphibious, with starchy rhizomes. The family is adapted to wind-pollination. Previously a food source, the plants are sometimes used today for water treatment.	Poales	Typha latifolia Typha latifolia Typha latifolia
Xyridaceae (yellow-eyed-grass family)	Xyris is from the Greek for "razor".	5 genera, in the tropics worldwide, temperate Australia and eastern North America	These non-woody rhizomatous plants often grow in wetlands.	Poales	Xyris gracilis Xyris gracilis Xyris gracilis
Zingiberaceae (ginger family)	Zingiber comes from Greek and possibly Sanskrit plant names.	57 genera, throughout the tropics, with some as far north as Japan and as far south as the Himalayas and South Africa	These plants are non-woody perennials, oily and fragrant or strong-smelling, some with large, showy bracts. Ginger was used as a spice in ancient India and Rome, and is still in wide use as a spice and condiment. Turmeric has been grown in India for millennia.	Zingiberales	Zingiber officinale (ginger) Zingiber officinale Zingiber officinale

== See also ==
- List of plant family names with etymologies
