= Forb =

Herbaceous, broad-leaved flowering plant

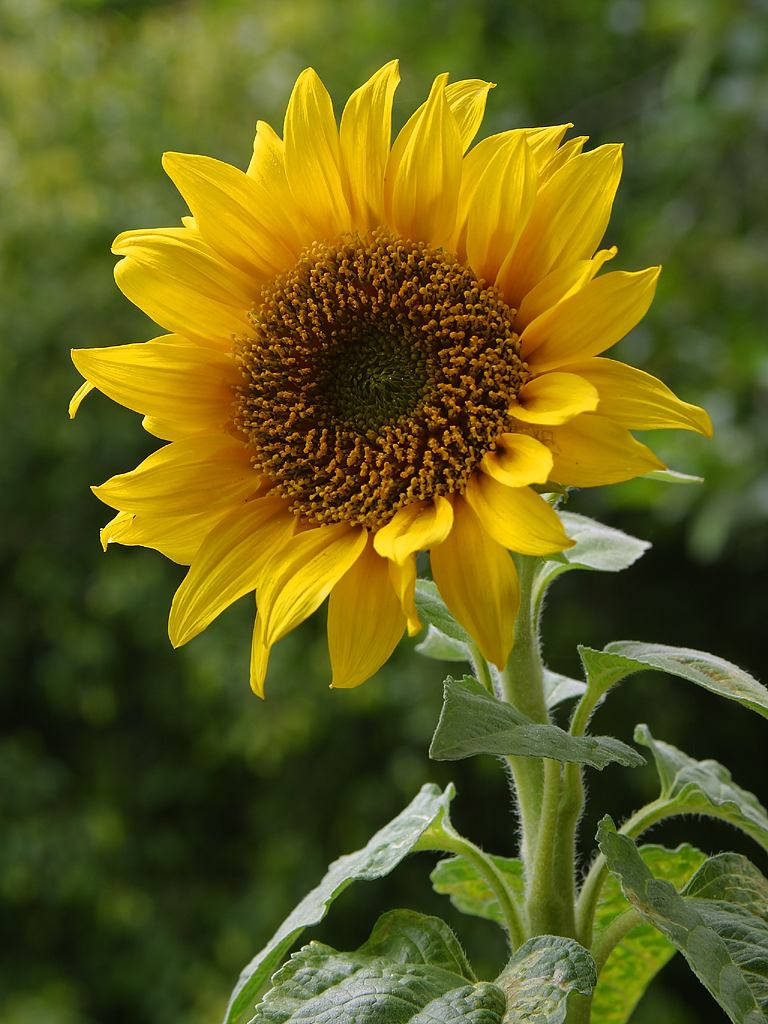
Sunflower (Helianthus annuus), a large forb

A forb or phorb is a herbaceous flowering plant that is not a graminoid (grass, sedge, or rush). The term is used in botany and in vegetation ecology especially in relation to grasslands and understory. Typically, these are eudicots without woody stems.

== Etymology ==
The word forb is derived from Greek phorbḗ (φορβή) 'pasture; fodder'. The Hellenic spelling phorb is sometimes used. In older usage, this sometimes includes graminids and other plants currently not regarded as forbs.

== Guilds ==
Forbs are members of a guild — a group of plant species with broadly similar growth forms. In certain contexts in ecology, guild membership may often be more important than the taxonomic relationships between organisms.

== In informal classification ==
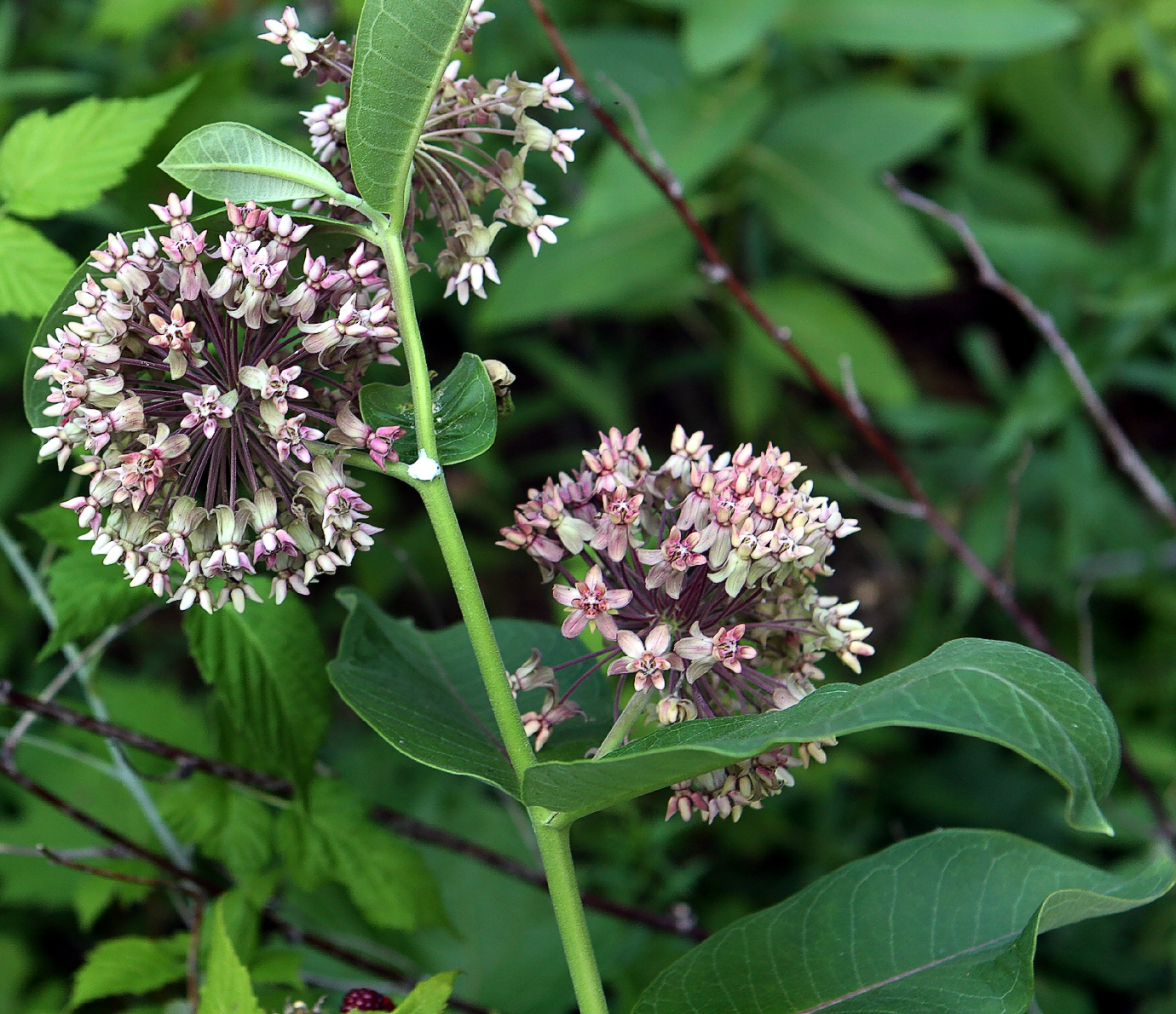
Milkweed (Asclepias)

In addition to its use in ecology, the term "forb" may be used for subdividing popular guides to wildflowers, distinguishing them from other categories such as grasses, sedges, shrubs, and trees. Some examples of forbs are clovers, sunflowers, daylilies, and milkweed.

Forb Adaptation Zones: Kale and turnip are examples of forb adaptations distributed over much of Europe, southern Oceania, northern Asia, and northern North America. In cooler climates, these crops are grown year-round, while in warmer climates, they are used as winter forage.

== Examples ==
- Helianthus annuus (sunflower)
- Raphanus sativus (radish)
- Taraxacum officinale (dandelion)
- Valeriana officinalis (valerian)

== See also ==
- Dicotyledon – Historical grouping of flowering plants
- Herbaceous plant – Plant that has no persistent woody stem above ground
- Overgrazing – When plants are grazed for extended periods without sufficient recovery time
- Tapestry lawn
