= J. elegans =

J. elegans may refer to:

- Jinfengopteryx elegans, a maniraptoran dinosaur species found in China
- Joinvillea elegans, a flowering plant species found in New Caledonia
