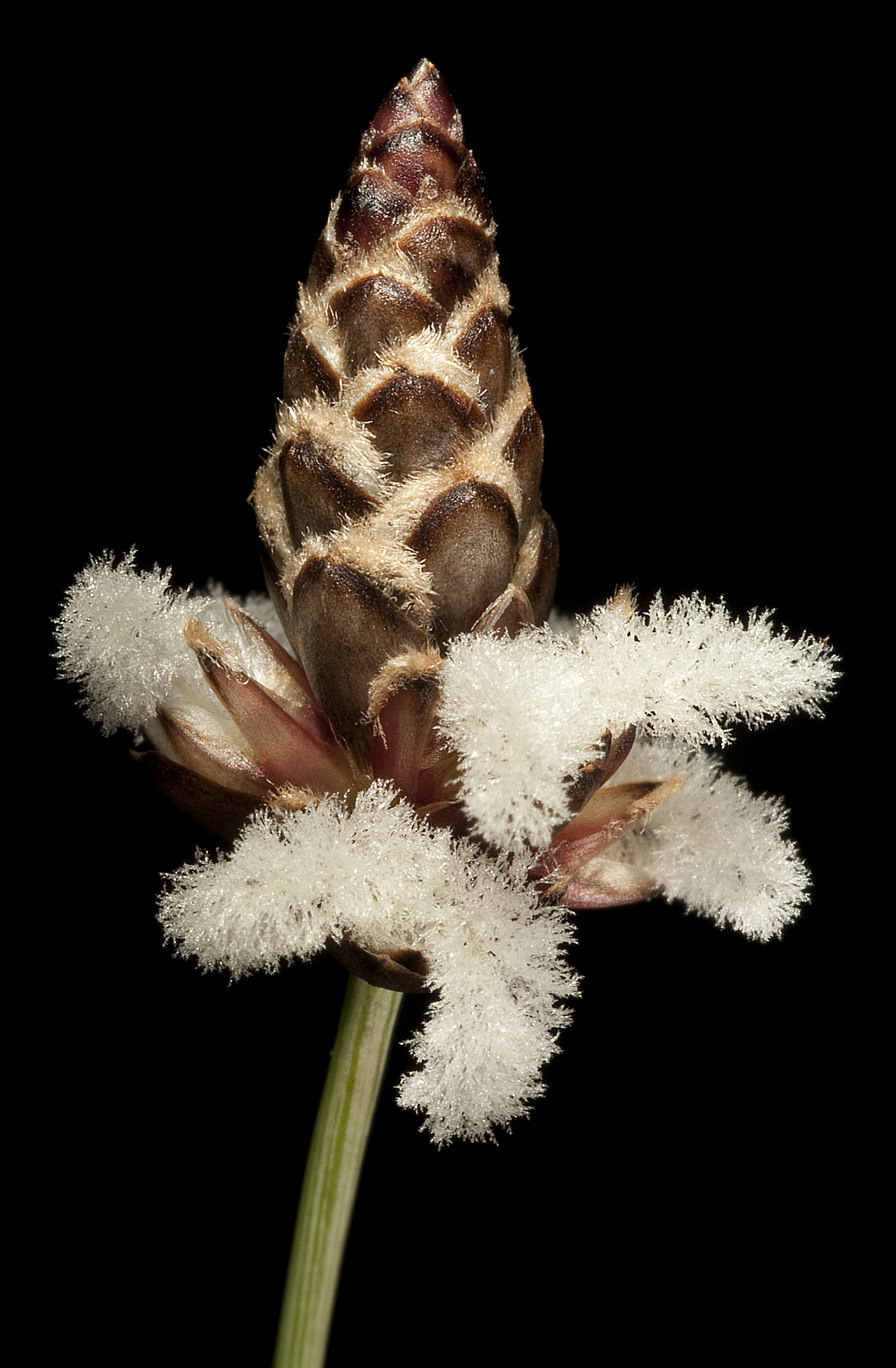
- Ecdeiocolea monostachya

Scientific classification
- Kingdom: Plantae
- Clade: Tracheophytes
- Clade: Angiosperms
- Clade: Monocots
- Clade: Commelinids
- Order: Poales
- Family: Ecdeiocoleaceae
- Genus: Ecdeiocolea; F.Muell.

Species
- Ecdeiocolea monostachya; Ecdeiocolea rigens

= Ecdeiocolea =

Genus of grasses

Ecdeiocolea is a genus of grass-like plants from Western Australia. It was first defined by von Mueller in 1874. Ecdeiocolea contains two species. The genus is a member of the small family Ecdeiocoleaceae and its type species is the widespread Ecdeiocolea monostachya F.Muell.

Ecdeiocolea is most closely related to the graminoid families Joinvilleaceae and Poaceae. Molecular phylogenetic studies indicate that Ecdeiocolea is sister to Poaceae.
