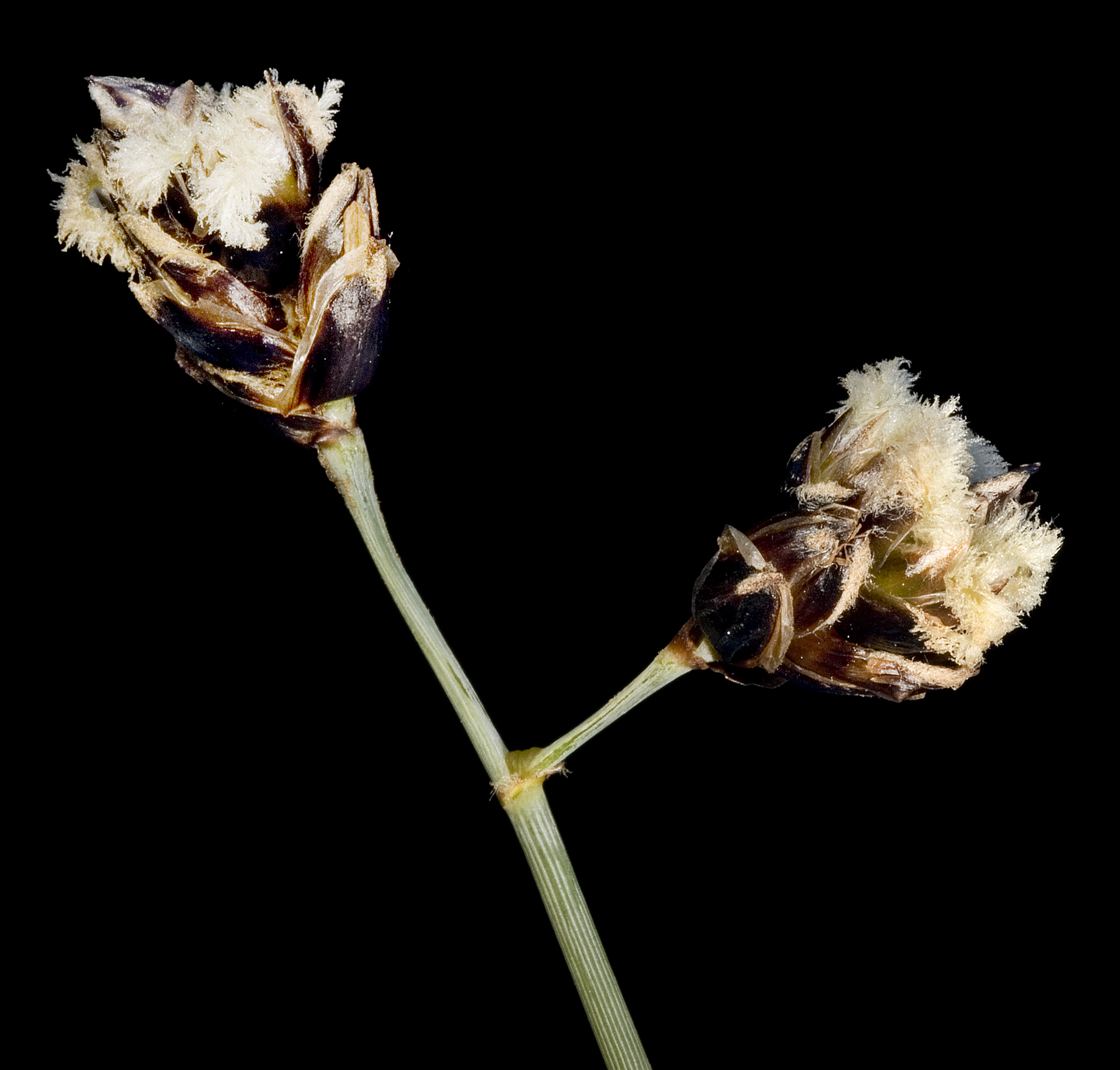

Scientific classification
- Kingdom: Plantae
- Clade: Embryophytes
- Clade: Tracheophytes
- Clade: Spermatophytes
- Clade: Angiosperms
- Clade: Monocots
- Clade: Commelinids
- Order: Poales
- Family: Ecdeiocoleaceae
- Genus: Georgeantha; B.G.Briggs & L.A.S.Johnson
- Species: G. hexandra

Binomial name
- Georgeantha hexandra B.G.Briggs & L.A.S.Johnson

= Georgeantha =

Georgeantha hexandra

Genus of flowering plants

Georgeantha is a monotypic genus of herbaceous, rhizomatous plant endemic to Western Australia. The sole species is Georgeantha hexandra. The genus is named after Western Australian botanist Alex George, and the specific epithet, "hexandra", is said to refer to the six (Greek, hexa) stamens (-andrus, male).
