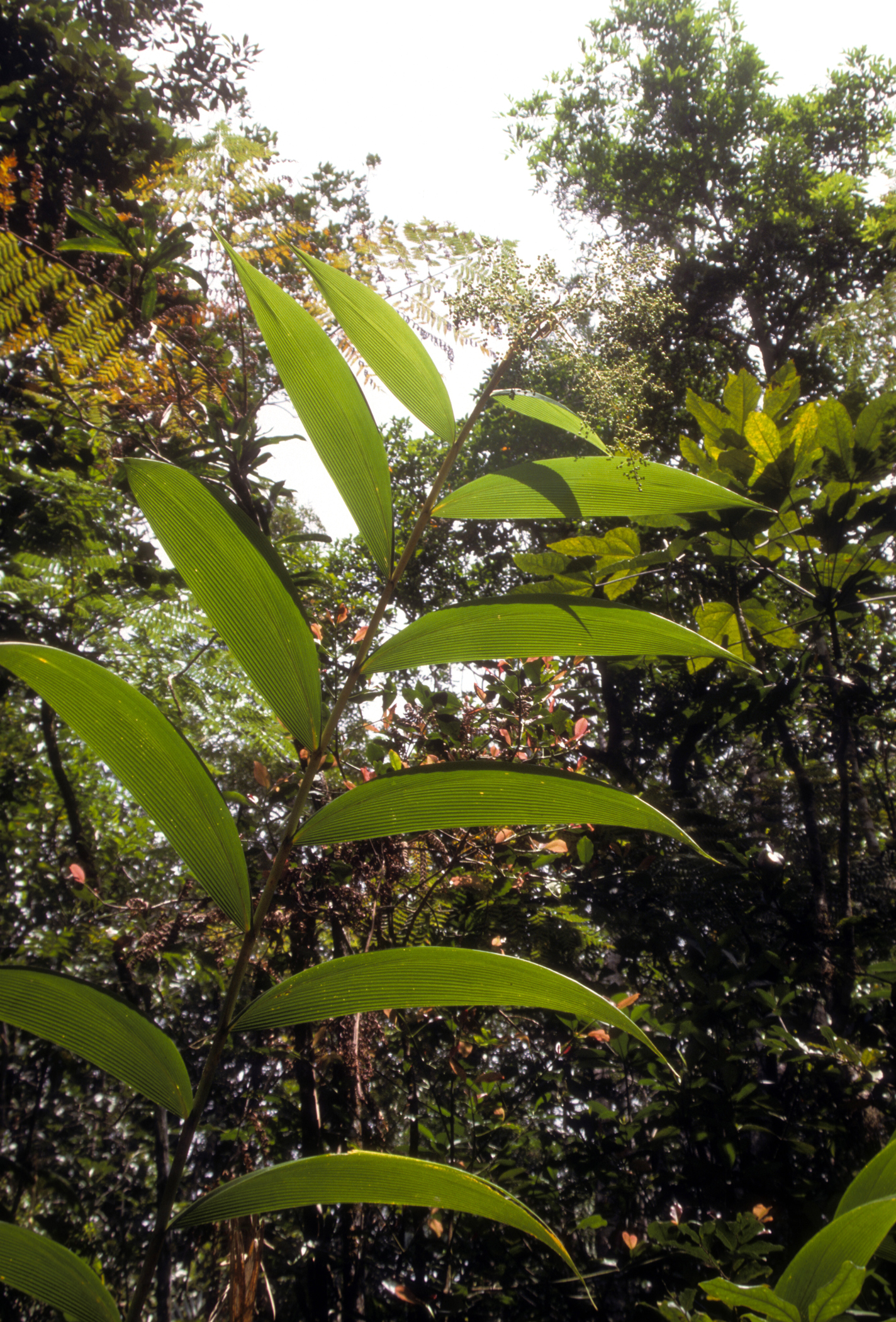

Scientific classification
- Kingdom: Plantae
- Clade: Tracheophytes
- Clade: Angiosperms
- Clade: Monocots
- Clade: Commelinids
- Order: Poales
- Family: Joinvilleaceae
- Genus: Joinvillea
- Species: J. plicata

Binomial name
- Joinvillea plicata (Hook.f.) Newell & B.C.Stone

Synonyms
- Flagellaria elegans Seem.; Flagellaria plicata Hook.f.; Joinvillea ascendens subsp. glabra Newell; Joinvillea elegans Gaudich. ex Brongn. & Gris

= Joinvillea plicata =

Species of flowering plant

Joinvillea plicata is a flowering plant species, one of four in the genus Joinvillea. It is found in New Caledonia and is considered a common plant by the natives.
