= Alex George (botanist) =

Australian botanist

Alex Segger George
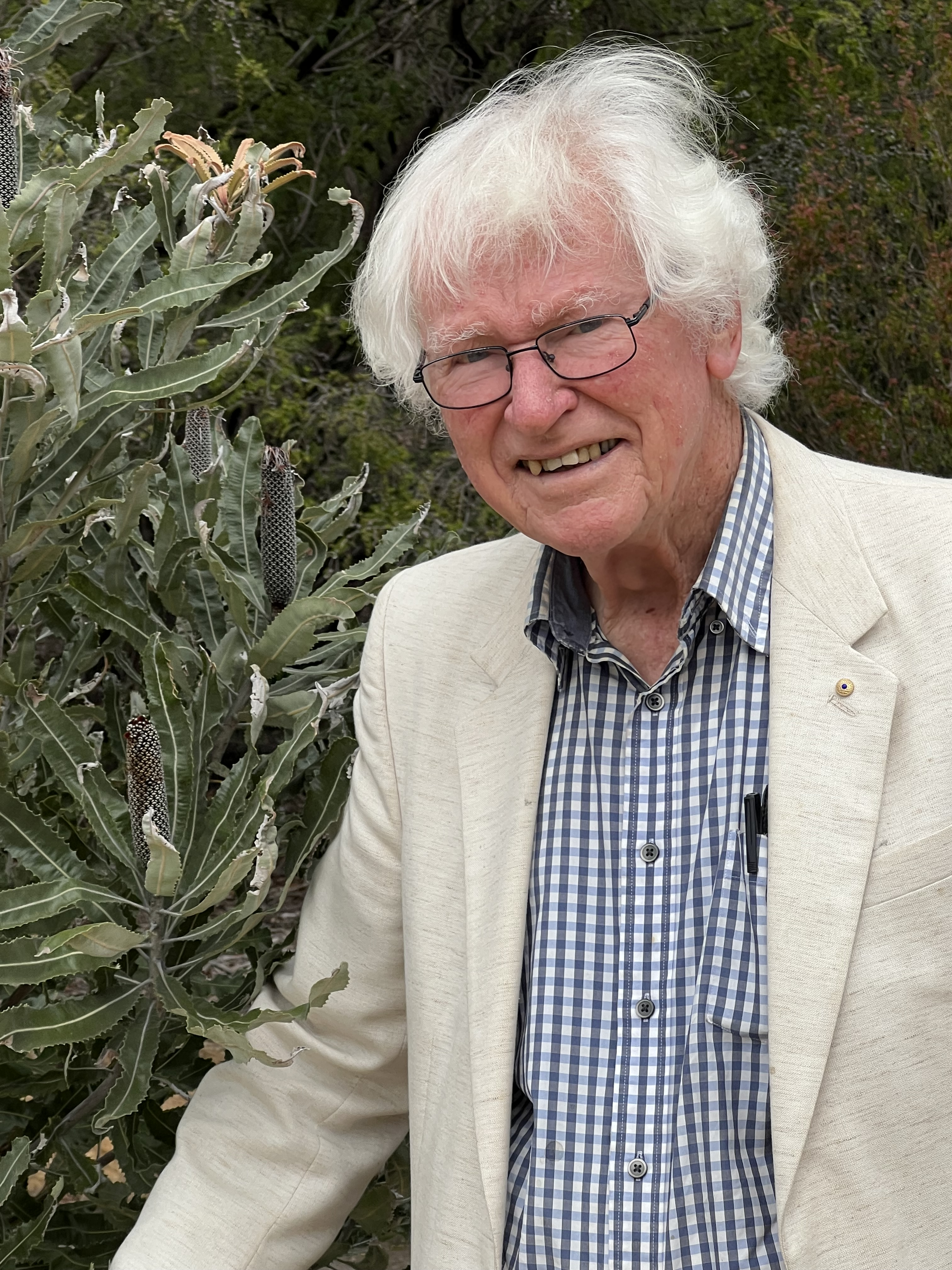
- In the banksia garden in the ANBG in 2023.
- Born: 4 April 1939 (age 87); Perth, Western Australia
- Citizenship: Australian
- Awards: Nancy T. Burbidge Medal (2004)
- Scientific career
- Fields: Botany
- Author abbrev. (botany): A.S.George

Alexander Segger George AM (born 4 April 1939) is an Australian botanist. He is an authority on the plant genera Banksia and Dryandra. The "bizarre" Restionaceae genus Alexgeorgea was named in his honour in 1976.

== Early life ==
Alex Segger George was born in Western Australia on 4 April 1939.

== Career ==
George joined the Western Australian Herbarium as a laboratory assistant at the age of 20 in 1959. He worked under Charles Gardner for a year before the latter's retirement, and partly credits him with rekindling an interest in banksias. In 1963 he graduated with a Bachelor of Arts from the University of Western Australia, and the following year added a botany major. Continuing at the Western Australian Herbarium as a botanist, in 1968 he was seconded as Australian Botanical Liaison Officer at the Royal Botanic Gardens in London. George also has an interest in history, especially historical biography of naturalists in Western Australia. He has published a number of articles in the field of history, including a history of the Royal Society of Western Australia and a tribute to naturalist and historian Rica Erickson. In 1999 he published a book on William Dampier's naturalist collections in Western Australia entitled William Dampier in New Holland: Australia's First Natural Historian.

George initially specialised in orchids, but his focus gradually moved to the Proteaceae genera Banksia and Dryandra and later Synaphea. He contributed the text to Celia Rosser's three volume The Banksias, published between 1981 and 2001, which contains Rosser's paintings of every Banksia species. In 1981 Nuytsia published his landmark monograph "The genus Banksia L.f. (Proteaceae)", the first systematic treatment of the taxonomy of Banksia since George Bentham's Flora Australiensis appeared in the 1870s. Three years later he published the popular The Banksia Book, and the following year he published An Introduction to the Proteaceae of Western Australia. In 1999, his taxonomy of the Banksia and Dryandra genera was published as part of the Flora of Australia series of monographs.

From 1981 to 1993, George lived in Canberra and worked as Executive Editor for the Flora of Australia series. His extensive revision of the genus Verticordia, an arrangement which included new taxa, was published in Nuytsia in 1991. He is now living in Perth again, and works as a botanical and editorial consultant. He is also an Honorary Research Associate with the Western Australian Herbarium, and an Adjunct Associate Professor with the College of Science, Murdoch University.

== Honours ==
In 2004 George received the Nancy T. Burbidge Medal from the Australasian Systematic Botany Society, and an honorary Doctor of Science from Murdoch University in 2009. On 11 June 2012, he was named a Member of the Order of Australia for "service to conservation and the environment as a botanist, historian and author, particularly in the area of Australian flora, and through roles with national and international professional organisations." A foundation member of the Australasian Systematic Botany Society, he was awarded life membership in 2024.

The genera Alexgeorgea and Georgeantha, and species Buellia georgei are named in his honour.

== Selected publications ==
- Orchids of Western Australia (1969)
- A New Eucalypt from Western Australia (1970)
- A List of the Orchidaceae of Western Australia (1971)
- Flowers and Plants of Western Australia (1973)
- The Genus Banksia (1981)
- The Banksias (1981–2002, with Celia Rosser)
- The Banksia Book (1984)
- An Introduction to the Proteaceae of Western Australia (1984)
- "New taxa, combinations and typifications in Verticordia (Myrtaceae: Chamelaucieae)." Nuytsia (1991)
- Notes on Banksia L.f. (Proteaceae) (1996)
- Wildflowers of Southern Western Australia (1996, with Margaret G. Corrick and Bruce A. Fuhrer)
- Banksia in Flora of Australia: Volume 17B: Proteaceae 3: Hakea to Dryandra (1999)
- Dryandra in Flora of Australia: Volume 17B: Proteaceae 3: Hakea to Dryandra (1999)
- William Dampier in New Holland: Australia's First Natural Historian (1999)
- The Long Dry: Bush Colours of Summer and Autumn in South-Western Australia (2002)
- Australian Botanist's Companion (2009)
- A Primer of Botanical Latin with Vocabulary (with Emma Short) (2013)
- Swanning around Perth: An Exploration of the Black Swan in our City (with Charmaine Cave) (2014,2016)
- Western Australian Plant Names and Their Meanings: A Glossary, 4th edition (2021)
- Peter Good:Kew's collector with Mathew Flinders on HMS Investigator, 1801-1803 (with David Moore) (2022)
- The Australian Botanical Liaison Officer scheme at Kew, 1937-2009
