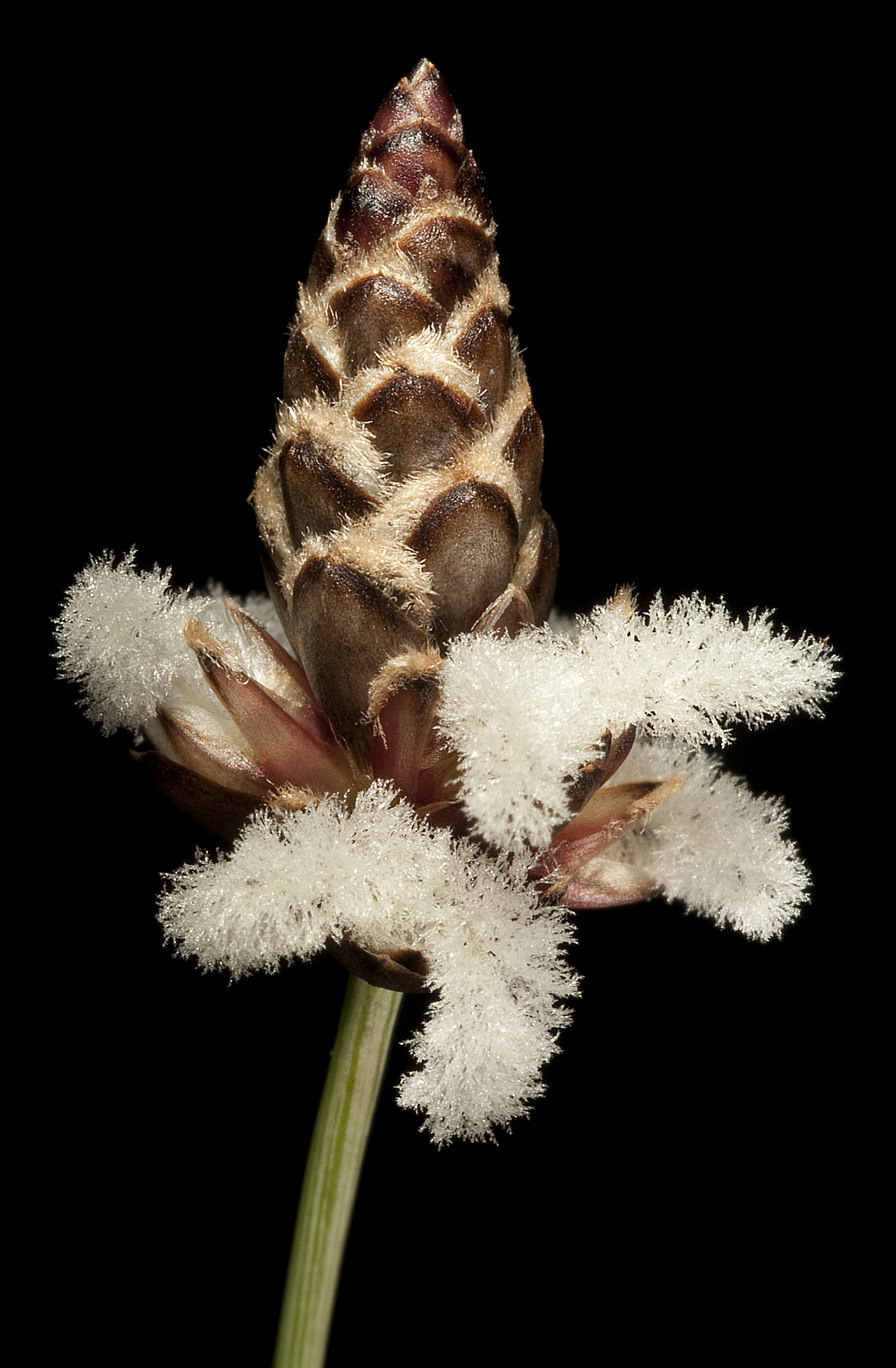

Scientific classification
- Kingdom: Plantae
- Clade: Tracheophytes
- Clade: Angiosperms
- Clade: Monocots
- Clade: Commelinids
- Order: Poales
- Family: Ecdeiocoleaceae
- Genus: Ecdeiocolea
- Species: E. monostachya

Binomial name
- Ecdeiocolea monostachya F.Muell.

= Ecdeiocolea monostachya =

Species of grass

Ecdeiocolea monostachya is a species of grass-like plant in the family Ecdeiocoleaceae native to Western Australia. It was first described by Mueller in 1874. It is a perennial herb which grows in tufts 0.4 to 1 m (1.3 to 3.3 ft) high and 1 m (3.3 ft) wide. It is found in yellow sands over laterite in Western Australia.
