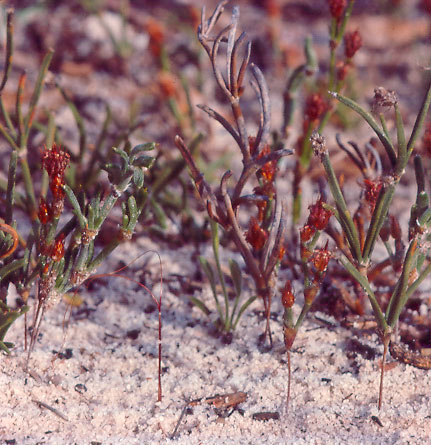
- Male Alexgeorgea flowers are in the background while only the three stigmas of a female flower are above ground.

Scientific classification
- Kingdom: Plantae
- Clade: Tracheophytes
- Clade: Angiosperms
- Clade: Monocots
- Clade: Commelinids
- Order: Poales
- Family: Restionaceae
- Genus: Alexgeorgea; Carlquist

Species
- A. ganopoda; A. nitens; A. subterranea

= Alexgeorgea =

Genus of grasses

Alexgeorgea is a genus of three plant species found in Western Australia belonging to the family Restionaceae named in honour of the botanist Alex George in 1976. The flowers of the female and large nut-like fruit are completely underground except for the stigmas, which extend out of the ground as 3 purple or red threads.

== Botanical history ==
The genus Alexgeorgea was first discovered by Sherwin Carlquist on 2 September 1974 when he found a population of A. subterranea on the Cockleshell Gully road north of Jurien Bay in Western Australia. At first, Carlquist, an American botanist and professor at Claremont Graduate University doing field work in Western Australia, could only locate male plants of what he immediately identified as a restionaceous species. In order to identify species in the Restionaceae, it is important to gather material of both male and female flowers, so Carlquist continued to search and only then noticed "purple thread-like structures emerging from the sand," which were the ephemeral styles of the mostly subterranean female flowers. In his original description of the new genus in a 1976 volume of the Australian Journal of Botany, Carlquist notes his discovery may have not occurred if he had not seen the female flowers at anthesis due to the short-lived nature of the thread-like styles.

Carlquist originally described two species in the genus, A. subterranea and A. arenicola (the species epithet arenicola means "a dweller on sand"). Ten years later in April 1986, Australian botanists Lawrence Alexander Sidney Johnson and Barbara G. Briggs, both of the Royal Botanic Gardens, Sydney, published a short article in the journal Telopea that recognized a species previously known as Restio nitens as a species better fitting the description of Alexgeorgea. Restio nitens was originally described by Christian Gottfried Daniel Nees von Esenbeck in 1848 as having above-ground dehiscent fruits, unlike the below-ground flowers and fruit of Alexgeorgea, though Carlquist had noted that R. nitens and his newly described A. arenicola were otherwise identical. Johnson examined the herbarium specimens labeled as R. nitens and discovered that the alleged above ground fruits were actually malformations possibly resulting from smut fungus. Both Johnson & Briggs and Carlquist independently published the new combination, moving the species R. nitens to the genus Alexgeorgea as A. nitens. In Carlquist's proposal, he identified A. arenicola a synonym of the older name A. nitens, which had priority. Johnson and Briggs published their description of A. nitens in the journal Telopea on April 24, preceding Carlquist's publication in the journal Aliso by only 5 days, thus making Carlquist's combination (A. nitens (Nees) Carlquist) an isonym of Johnson and Briggs's combination (A. nitens (Nees) L.A.S.Johnson & B.G.Briggs). The third species, A. ganopoda, was described by Johnson and Briggs in 1990.
