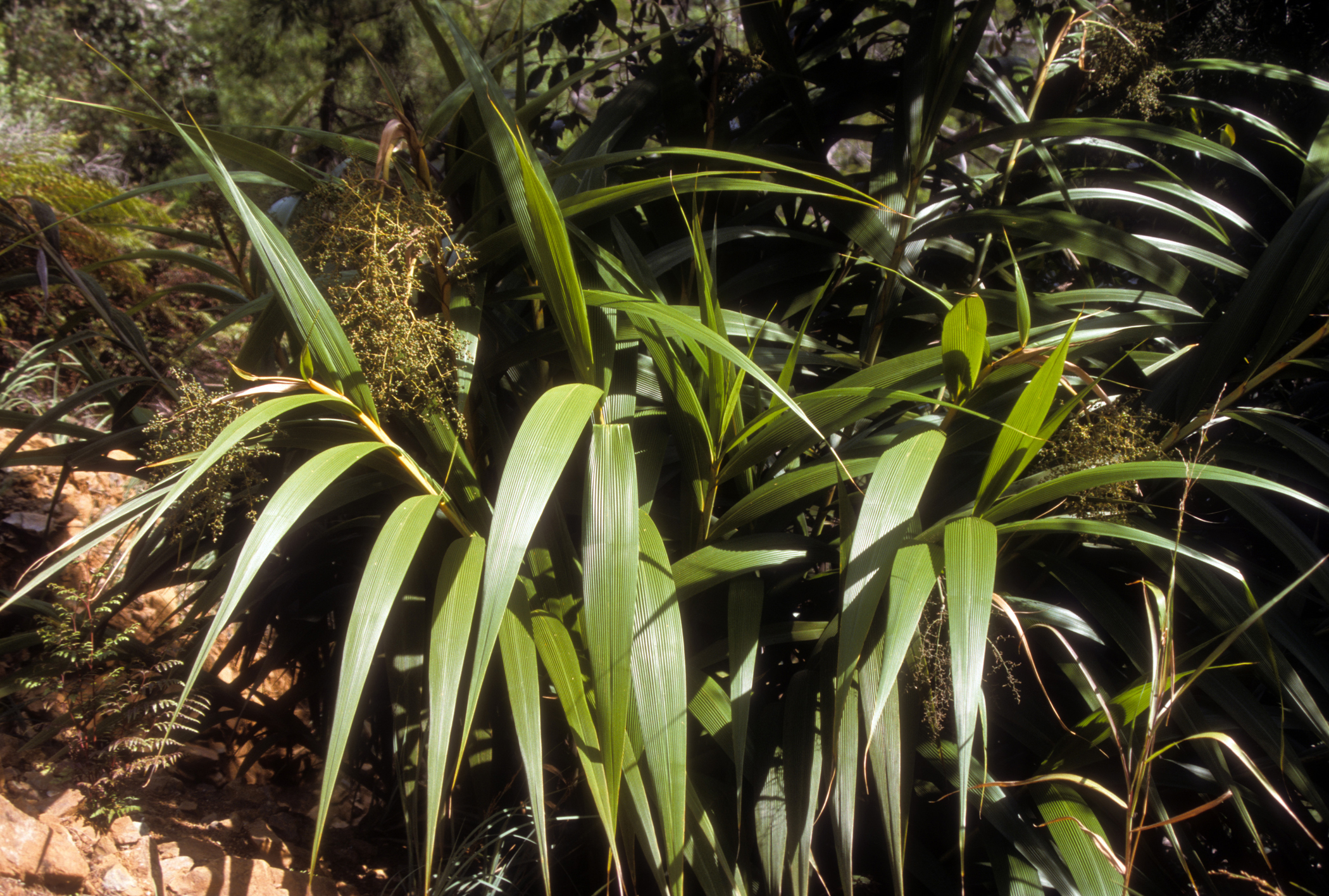
- Joinvillea ascendens

Scientific classification
- Kingdom: Plantae
- Clade: Tracheophytes
- Clade: Angiosperms
- Clade: Monocots
- Clade: Commelinids
- Order: Poales
- Family: Joinvilleaceae
- Genus: Joinvillea; Gaudich. ex Brongn. & Gris

Species
- See text

= Joinvillea =

Genus of flowering plants

Joinvillea is a flowering plants genus in the family Joinvilleaceae. The family consists of one genus with species distributed from the Malay Peninsula to the Caroline Islands and high islands in the Pacific Ocean. It is evolutionarily significant as a relictual group that is a close relative of grasses. They closely resemble large grass plants, in both general appearance and microanatomy, but possess fleshy fruits.

== Species ==
- Joinvillea ascendens Gaudich. ex Brongn. & Gris Hawaiian Islands
- Joinvillea borneensis Becc. Western Malesia to Caroline Islands
- Joinvillea bryanii Christoph. Samoa
- Joinvillea plicata (Hook.f.) Newell & B.C.Stone Solomon Islands to New Caledonia and southwest Pacific
