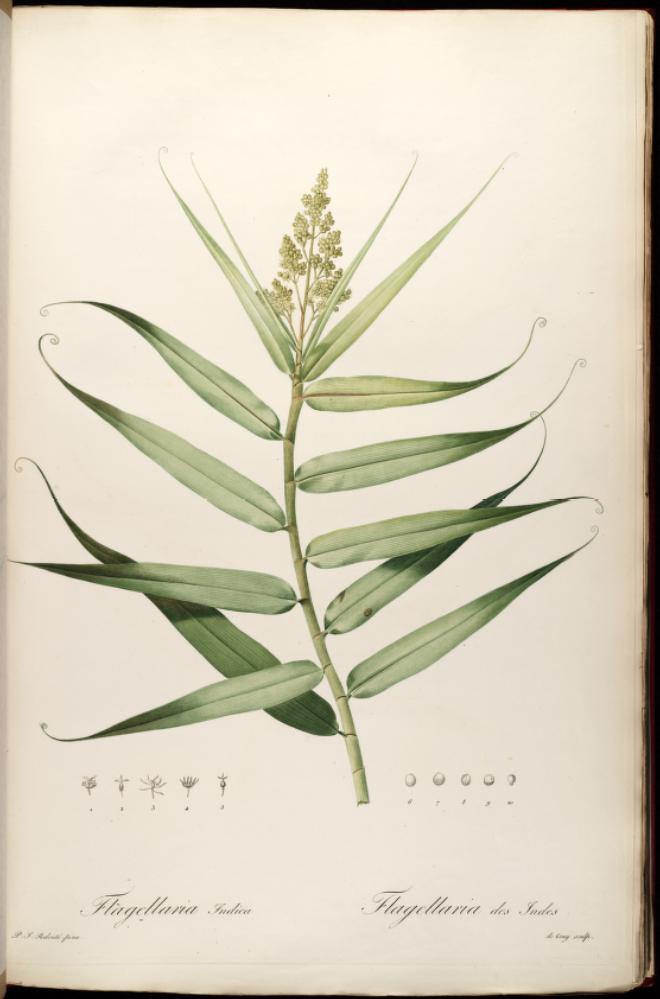
- Flagellaria indica

Scientific classification
- Kingdom: Plantae
- Clade: Tracheophytes
- Clade: Angiosperms
- Clade: Monocots
- Clade: Commelinids
- Order: Poales
- Family: Flagellariaceae
- Genus: Flagellaria
- Species: F. indica

Binomial name
- Flagellaria indica L.

= Flagellaria indica =

Whip vine

Species of flowering plant

Flagellaria indica is a climbing plant found in many of the tropical and subtropical regions of the Old World, in India, Bangladesh, Southeast Asia, Polynesia, and Australia.

A strong climber, it grows often up to 15 metres (49 ft) tall, with thick cane-like stems exceeding 15 mm (0.6 in) in diameter. Its leaves, without hairs, are 10 to 40 centimetres (4 to 16 in) long, and 5 to 20 mm (0.2 to 0.8 in) wide, with a coiled apical tendril which forms the holding part of the climbing plant. Fragrant white flowers form in panicles, 10 to 25 centimetres (4 to 10 in) long. The fruit is inedible. The globose drupes are red when mature, 5 millimetres (25/128 in) in diameter, usually with only one seed.

Because of its wide distribution, many local common names are used, such as whip vine, hell tail, supplejack, false rattan, and bush cane.

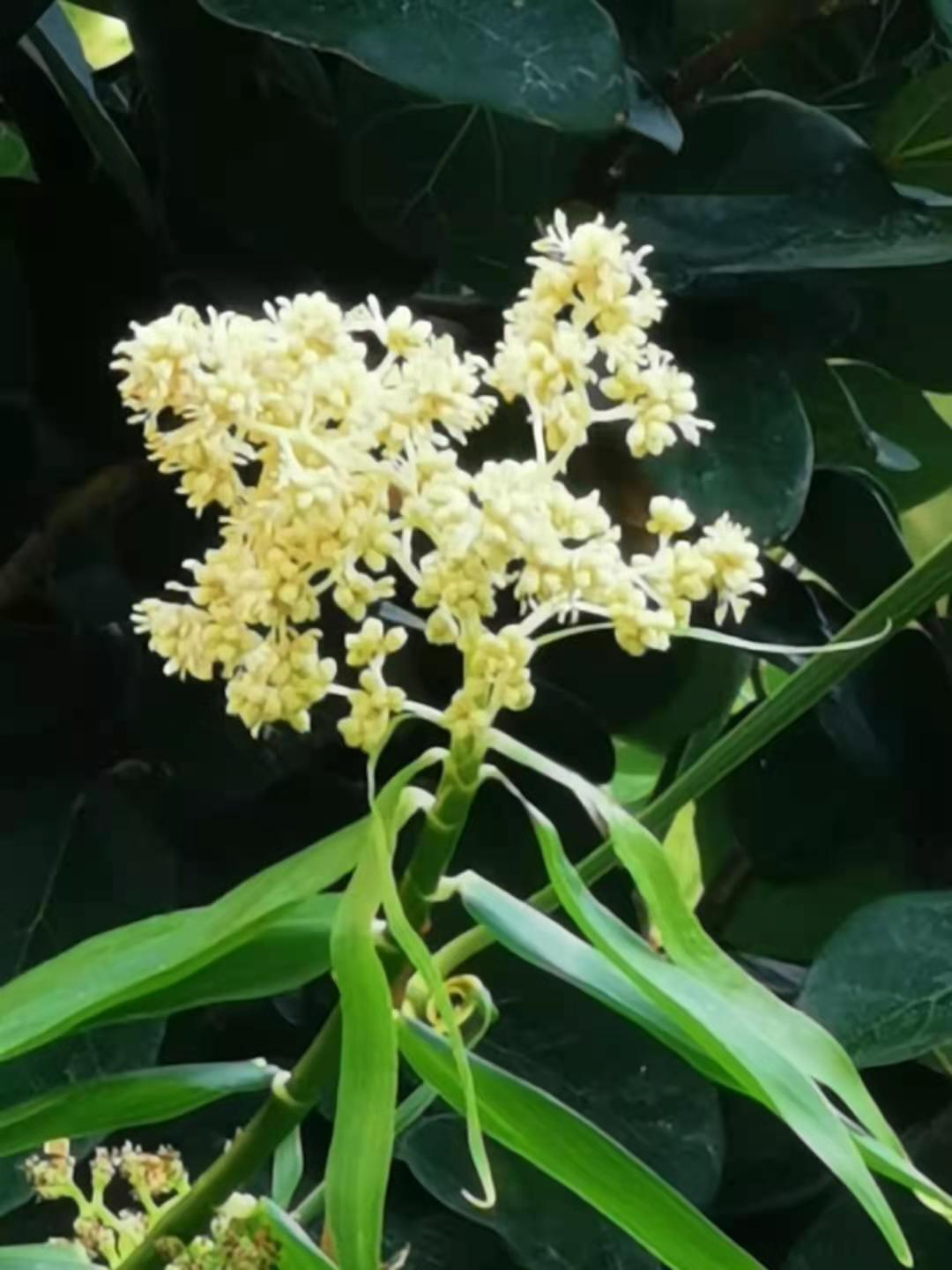
Inflorescence, irregularly branched. Stamens exserted.

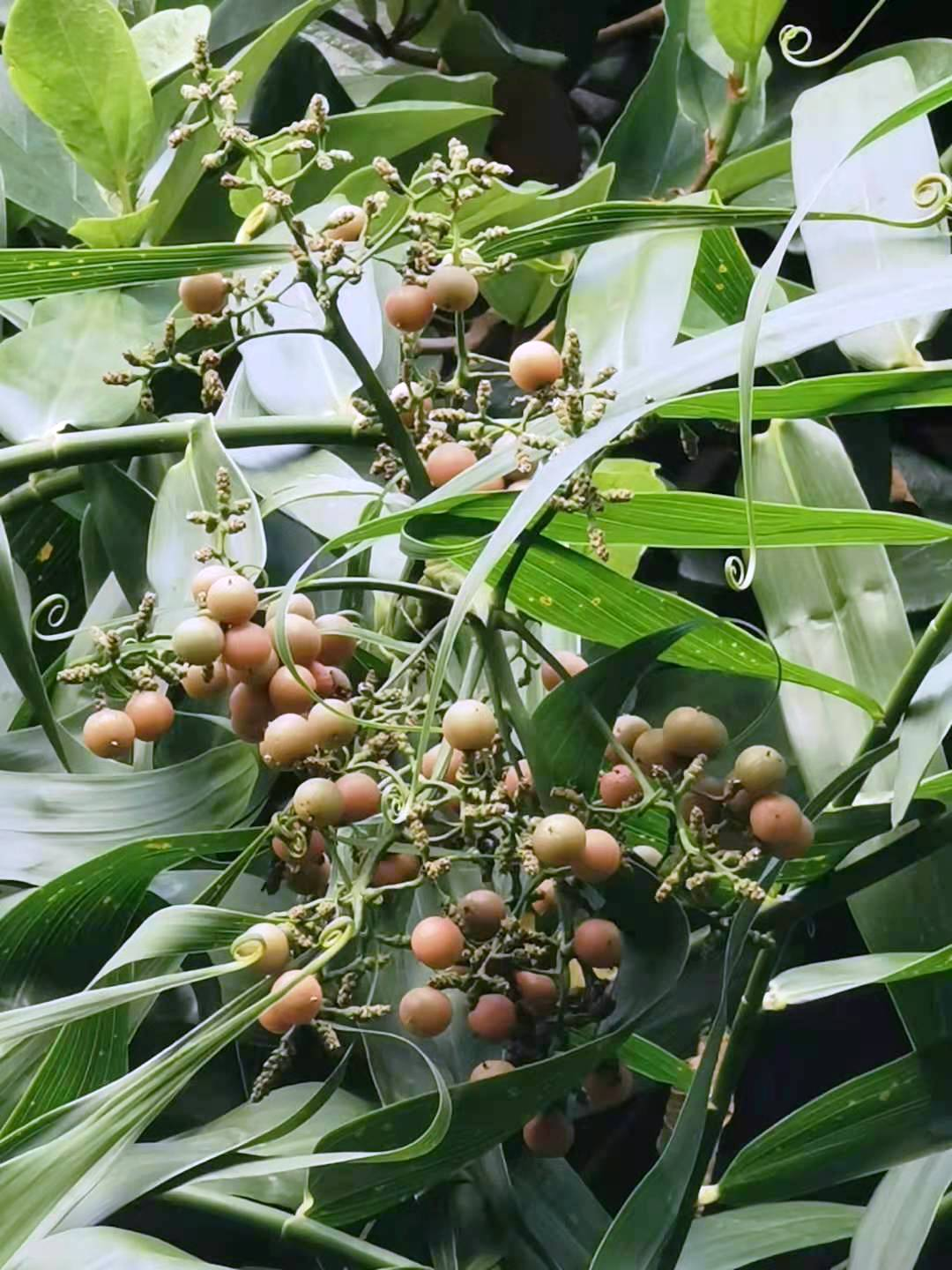
Drupes are green at first.

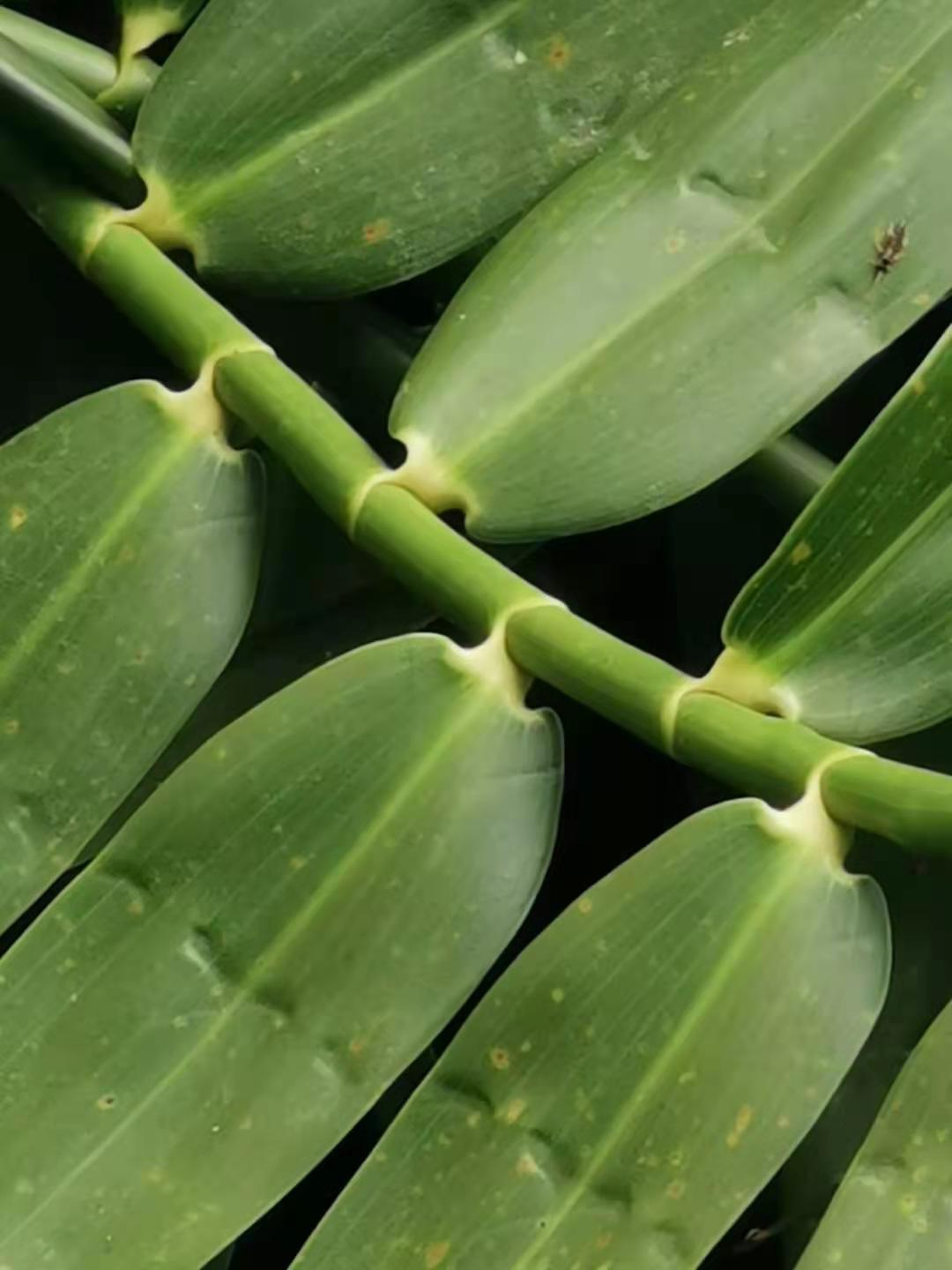
Leaf sheaths with two auricles

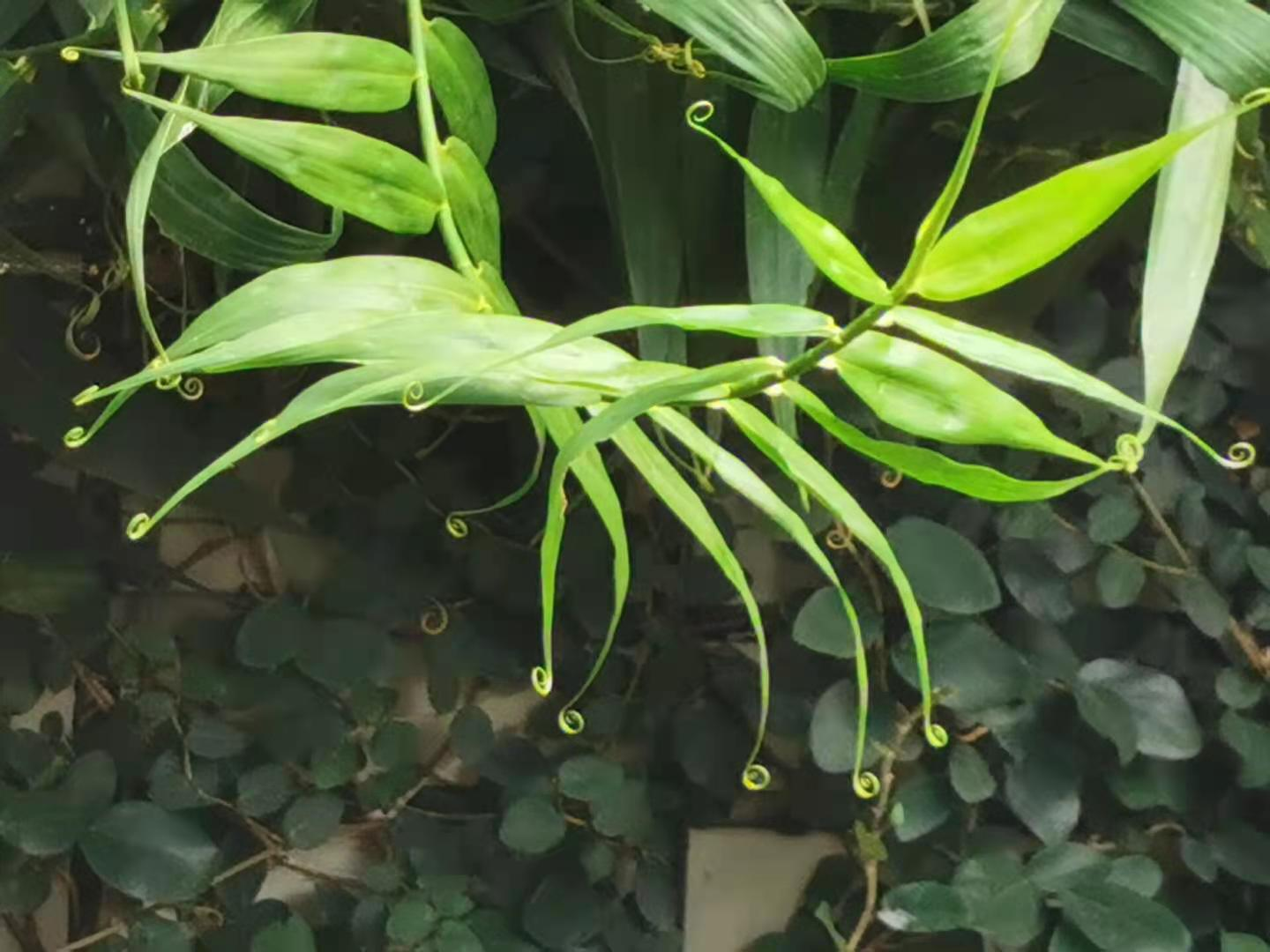
Tendrils: the holding part

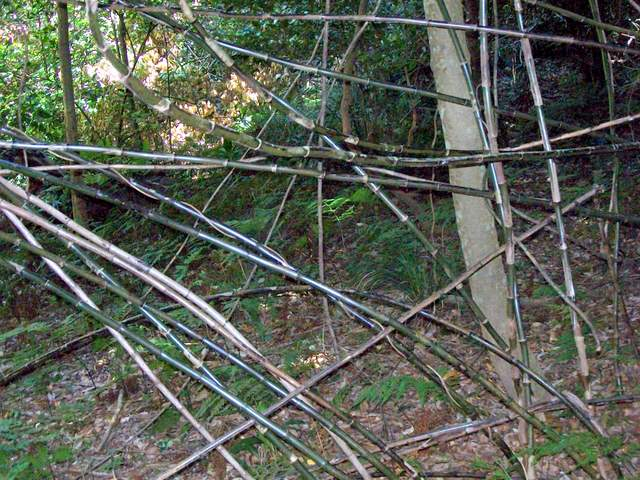
Southernmost limit of natural distribution Royal National Park, Australia

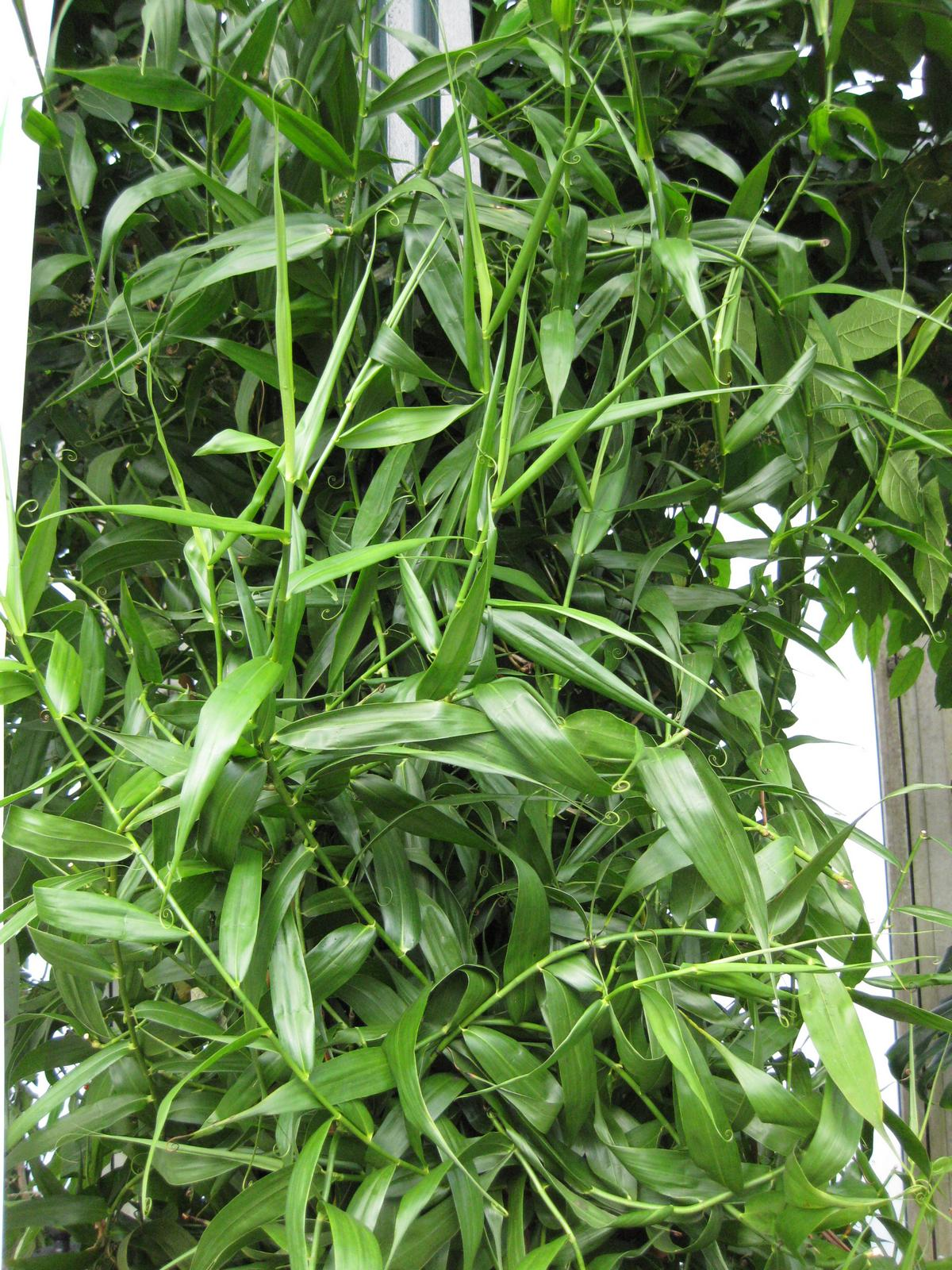
