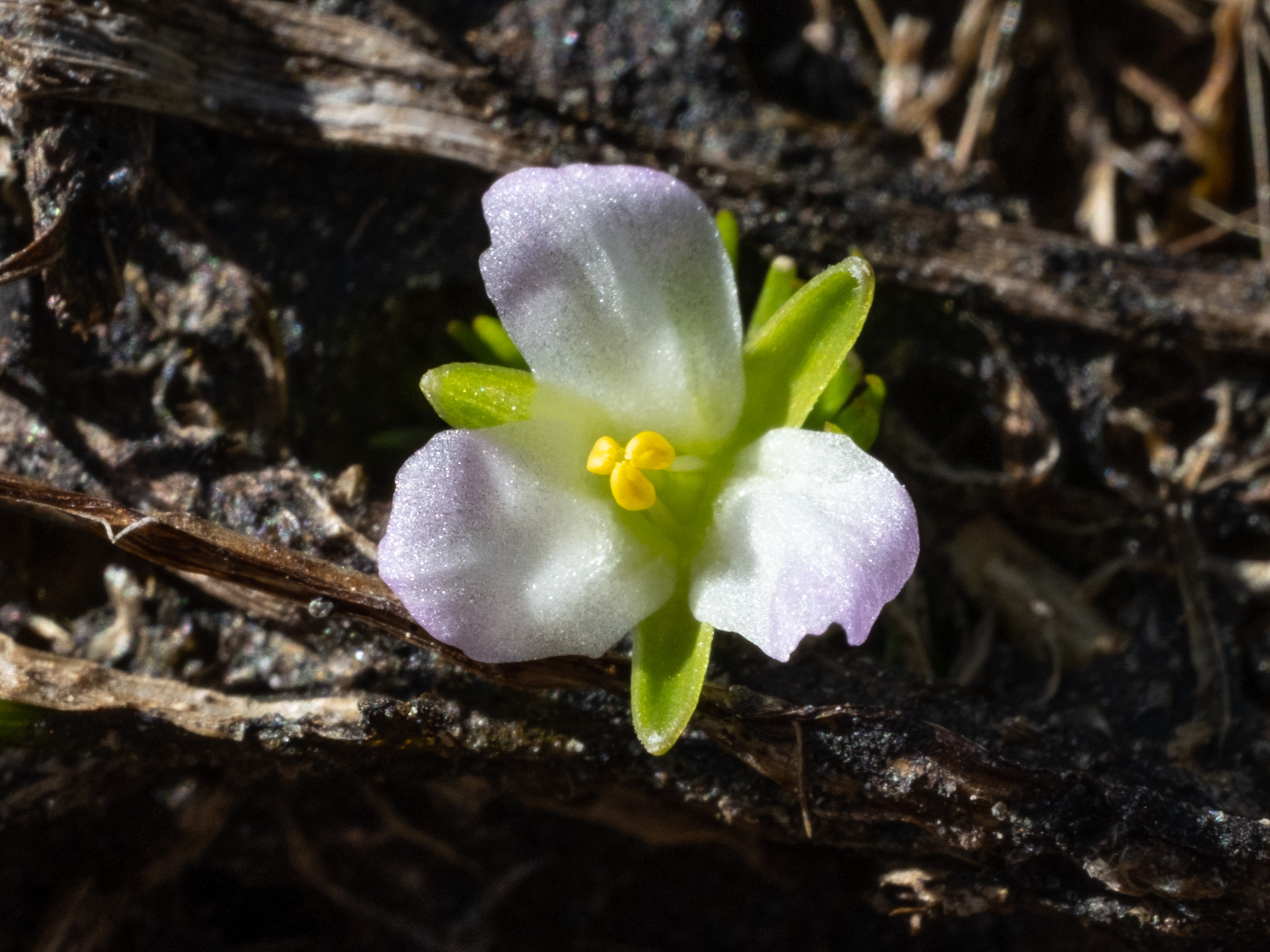

Scientific classification
- Kingdom: Plantae
- Clade: Tracheophytes
- Clade: Angiosperms
- Clade: Monocots
- Clade: Commelinids
- Order: Poales
- Family: Mayacaceae
- Genus: Mayaca
- Species: M. fluviatilis

Binomial name
- Mayaca fluviatilis Aubl., 1775

= Mayaca fluviatilis =

Bog moss

Species of aquatic plant

Mayaca fluviatilis, also known as bog moss, is a perennial herbaceous submerged plant in the monogeneric family Mayacaceae. It is native to Central and South America, the Caribbean, and the United States where it is often sold as an aquarium plant. Through the aquatic plant trade, it has recently become naturalized in Sri Lanka, Singapore, and China. It has been identified in three locations in Australia (Innisfail and Mossman in Queensland and Taree in New South Wales) but more populations are likely in other parts of Australia as well.

== Description ==
The species was first described by the French botanist Jean Baptiste Christophore Fusée Aublet as La mayaque des rivieres in a tributary of the Sinnamary river in Guyana.

Mayaca fluviatilis has soft thin leaves arranged in spirals on white or pale green stems which frequently grow up to one meter in length. Flowers grow on single stalks, 2 to 5 cm (0.8 to 2.0 in) long, and are roughly 1 cm in diameter. The flowers of Mayaca fluviatilis, like those of other Mayaca species, are lateral, heterochlamydeous (dissimilar sepals and petals in the whorls of the perianth), and isostemonous (has an equal number of stamens and petals). As a submerged plant, it is capable of growing in wet soil during the dry seasons. When submerged, it superficially resembles Hydrilla verticillata, a native aquatic plant of Sri Lanka.

== As an invasive species ==
Seeds are dispersed through the water, although specimens sold as aquarium plants are purported to be sterile. Stem fragments as small as 2 cm are capable of re-establishing new plants. When growing submerged Mayaca fluviatilis can form semi-floating mats in water up to 2 m (6.6 ft) deep or as a semi-terrestrial plant in quasi-aquatic environments such as wetlands. Uncontrolled, these mats can block drains and irrigation channels, among other consequences. If the mats break free during flooding they are a risk to moored boats as well as bridges. There is also concern of Mayaca fluviatilis in Sri Lanka outcompeting endemic plants in already threatened habitats.

Hydrilla verticillata has been shown to outcompete Mayaca fluviatilis in experimental settings and may be useful as a way of controlling invasive growth.
