= Lillium =

Populated place in Bithynia

Coordinates: 41°05′25″N 31°11′12″E

Lillium or Lillion (Ancient Greek: Λίλλιον), or Lileon or Lileum (Λιλεόν), or Lilaeus or Lilaios (Λίλαιος), was a commercial town (emporium) on the Black Sea coast of ancient Bithynia, 40 stadia to the east of Dia. It is possible that the place may have derived its name from the Lilaeus, which Pliny the Elder mentions among the rivers of Bithynia.

Its site is located east of Akçakoca in Asiatic Turkey.
