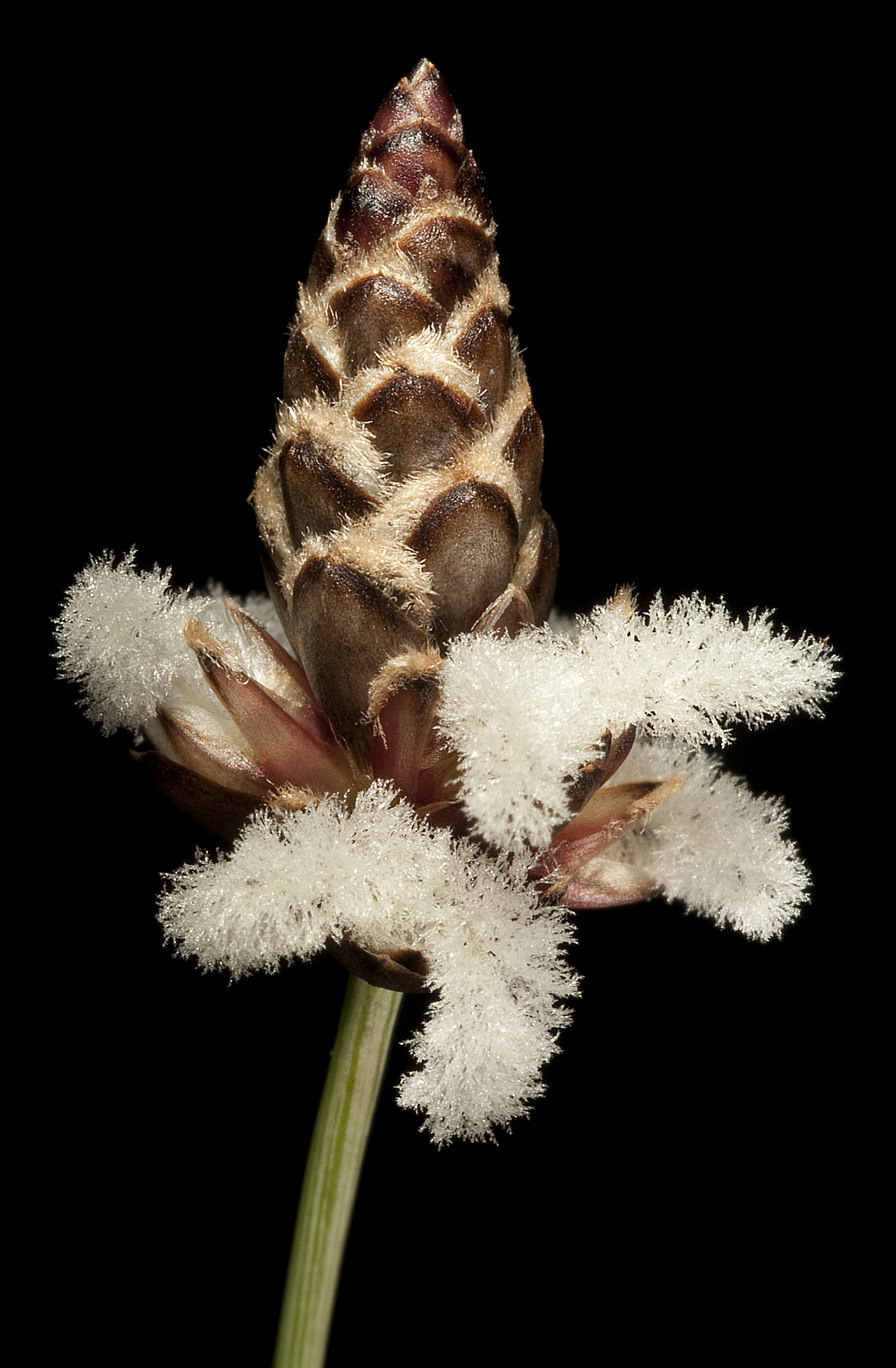
- Ecdeiocolea monostachya

Scientific classification
- Kingdom: Plantae
- Clade: Tracheophytes
- Clade: Angiosperms
- Clade: Monocots
- Clade: Commelinids
- Order: Poales
- Clade: Graminid clade
- Family: Ecdeiocoleaceae; D.F.Cutler & Airy Shaw,

Genera
- Ecdeiocolea F.Muell.; Georgeantha B.G.Briggs & L.A.S.Johnson

= Ecdeiocoleaceae =

Family of grasses

The Ecdeiocoleaceae are a family of flowering plants consisting of two genera and three species. The botanical name has rarely been recognized by taxonomists.

The APG II system, in 2003 (unchanged from the APG system, 1998), does recognize such a family, and assigns it to the order Poales in the clade commelinids, in the monocots. Three species in two genera, Ecdeiocolea and Georgeantha, both endemic to Southwest Australia, have been described to date.
