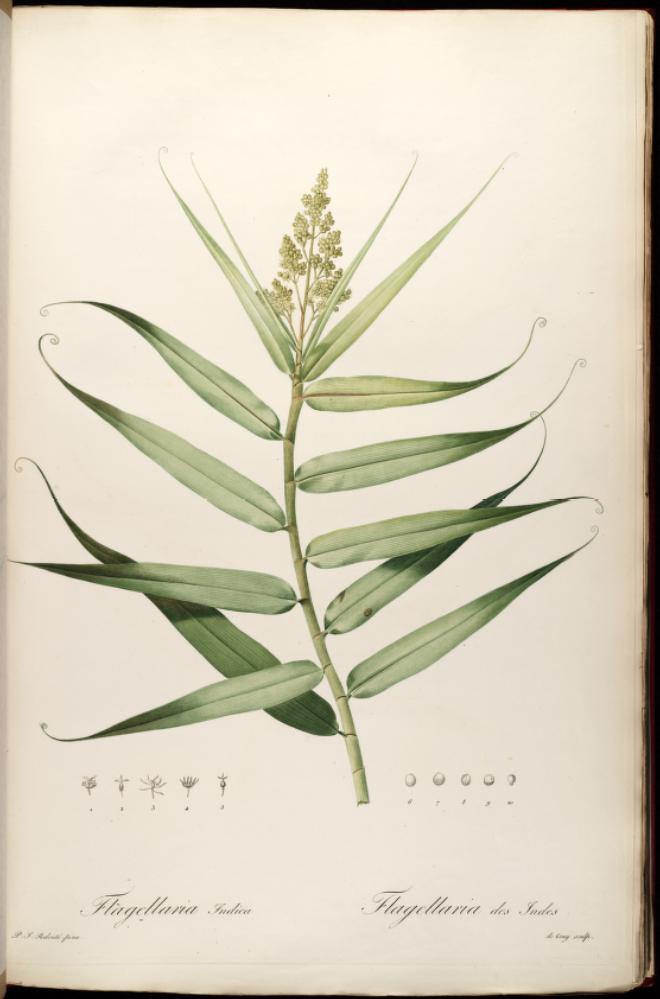
- Flagellaria indica

Scientific classification
- Kingdom: Plantae
- Clade: Tracheophytes
- Clade: Angiosperms
- Clade: Monocots
- Clade: Commelinids
- Order: Poales
- Clade: Graminid clade
- Family: Flagellariaceae; Dumort.
- Genus: Flagellaria; L.

= Flagellaria =

Genus of flowering plants

Flagellaria is the sole genus in the flowering plant family Flagellariaceae with only five species. The family is accepted by the APG II system of 2003 (and unchanged from the APG system, 1998); it is assigned to the order Poales in the clade commelinids, in the monocots.

Flagellaria consists of only five known species, found in the tropical and subtropical regions of Asia, Africa, Australia, and various island of the Pacific and Indian Oceans. They are vines which branch dichotomously, with each of the leaves tipped with a tendril.

== List of species ==
- Flagellaria collaris Wepfer & H.P.Linder - Fiji
- Flagellaria gigantea Hook.f. - New Guinea, Solomon Islands, Samoa, Niue, Fiji, New Guinea
- Flagellaria guineensis Schumach. - tropical and southern Africa, Madagascar, Sri Lanka
- Flagellaria indica L. - Asia, Papuasia, Australia, Micronesia, Madagascar, Seychelles, Mauritius, Réunion, Rodrigues Island, Mozambique, Tanzania
- Flagellaria neocaledonica Schltr. - Solomon Islands, New Caledonia
