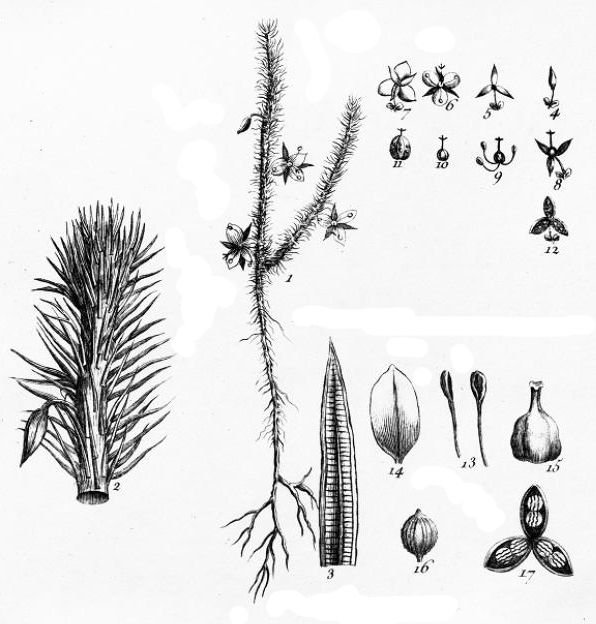
- Mayaca fluviatilis 1775 illustration

Scientific classification
- Kingdom: Plantae
- Clade: Embryophytes
- Clade: Tracheophytes
- Clade: Spermatophytes
- Clade: Angiosperms
- Clade: Monocots
- Clade: Commelinids
- Order: Poales
- Family: Mayacaceae; Kunth
- Genus: Mayaca; Aubl.

Synonyms
- Biaslia Vand.; Syena Schreb.; Coletia Vell.

= Mayaca =

Genus of flowering plants

Mayaca is a genus of flowering plants, often placed in its own family, the Mayacaceae (or Mayaceae in earlier systems). In the APG II system of 2003, it is assigned to the order Poales in the clade commelinids. The Cronquist system, of 1981, also recognised such a family and placed it in the order Commelinales in the subclass Commelinidae.

The group is widely distributed in Latin America from Mexico to Argentina, as well as in the West Indies, the southeastern United States, and central Africa.

== Species ==
Eighteen or so species names have been proposed, but only 5 are accepted as distinct.

- Mayaca baumii Gürke - Congo-Brazzabille, Zaïre, Angola, Zambia
- Mayaca fluviatilis Aubl. - southeastern United States from Texas to North Carolina; West Indies (Cuba, Jamaica, Trinidad); Latin America from central Mexico to Argentina
- Mayaca kunthii Seub. - Venezuela, Brazil, Uruguay
- Mayaca longipes Mart. ex Seub. - Venezuela, Brazil, Colombia, the Guianas
- Mayaca sellowiana Kunth - Costa Rica, Venezuela, Brazil, Colombia, the Guianas, Peru, Ecuador, Bolivia, Argentina
