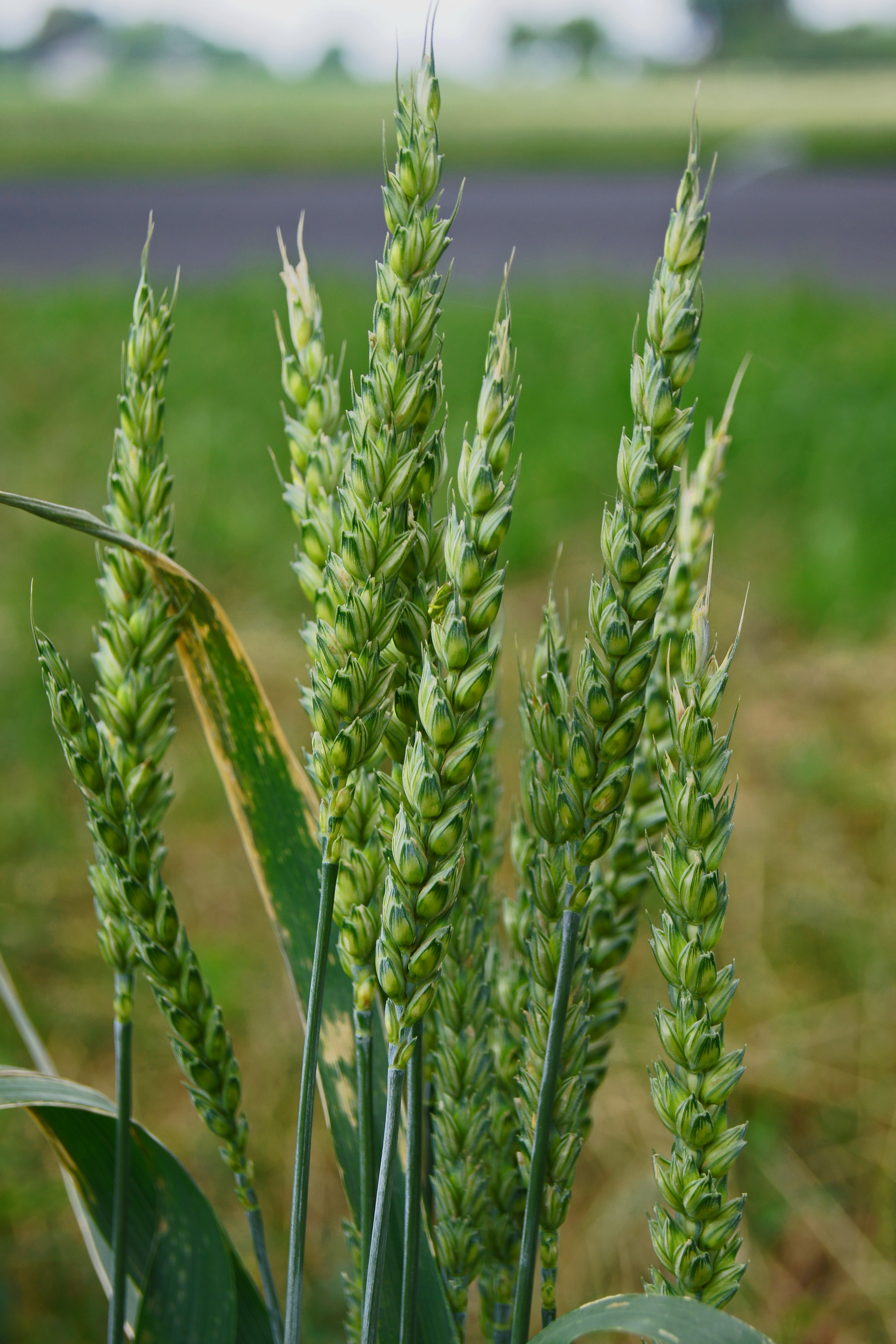
- Common wheat (Triticum aestivum)

Scientific classification
- Kingdom: Plantae
- Clade: Tracheophytes
- Clade: Angiosperms
- Clade: Monocots
- Clade: Commelinids
- Order: Poales
- Clade: Graminid clade

Families
- Joinvilleaceae; Ecdeiocoleaceae; Flagellariaceae; Poaceae

Diversity
- ca. 12,000 species

= Graminid clade =

Graminid clade Temporal range: Late Cretaceous–Recent

Clade of flowering plants

The graminid clade is a clade of plants in the order Poales uniting four families, of which the grasses (Poaceae) are the most species-rich. Its sister group is the restiid clade.

- Restiid clade
- Graminid clade
  - Flagellariaceae
  - - Poaceae
    - - Ecdeiocoleaceae
      - Joinvilleaceae
