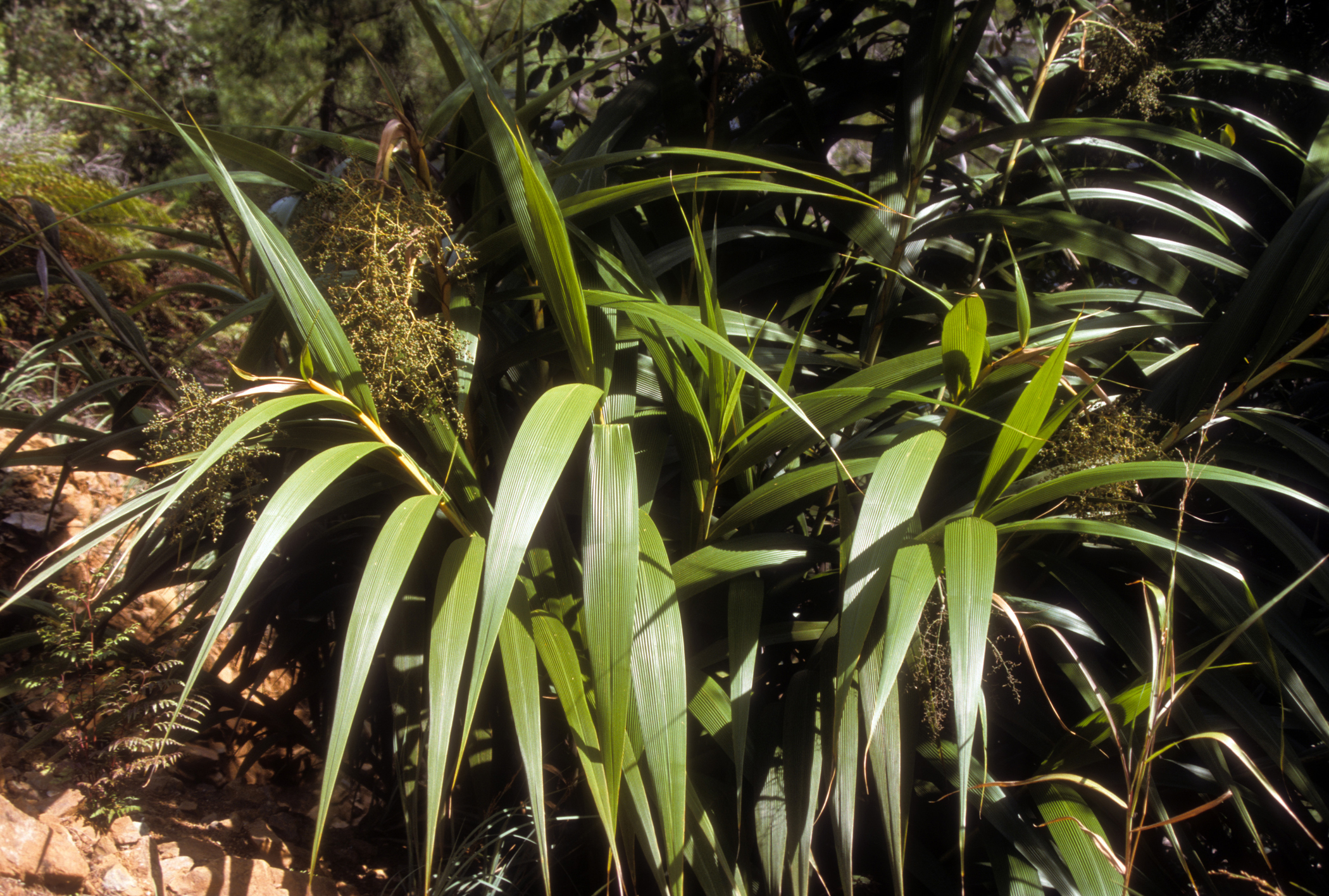
- Joinvillea ascendens

Scientific classification
- Kingdom: Plantae
- Clade: Embryophytes
- Clade: Tracheophytes
- Clade: Angiosperms
- Clade: Monocots
- Clade: Commelinids
- Order: Poales
- Clade: Graminid clade
- Family: Joinvilleaceae; Toml. & A.C.Sm.

Genera
- Joinvillea

= Joinvilleaceae =

Family of flowering plants

The Joinvilleaceae are a family of flowering plants with a single genus including four species. The APG II system, of 2003 (unchanged from the APG system, 1998) assigns it to the order Poales in the clade commelinids in the monocots. The family consists of one genus with four currently accepted species, distributed from the Malay Peninsula to the Caroline Islands and high islands in the Pacific Ocean. It is evolutionarily significant as a relictual group closely related to grasses. They closely resemble large grass plants, in both general appearance and microanatomy, but possess fleshy fruits.

== Species ==
- Joinvillea ascendens Gaudich. ex Brongn. & Gris Hawaiian Islands
- Joinvillea borneensis Becc. Western Malesia to Caroline Islands
- Joinvillea bryanii Christoph. Samoa
- Joinvillea plicata (Hook.f.) Newell & B.C.Stone Solomon Islands to New Caledonia and southwest Pacific
