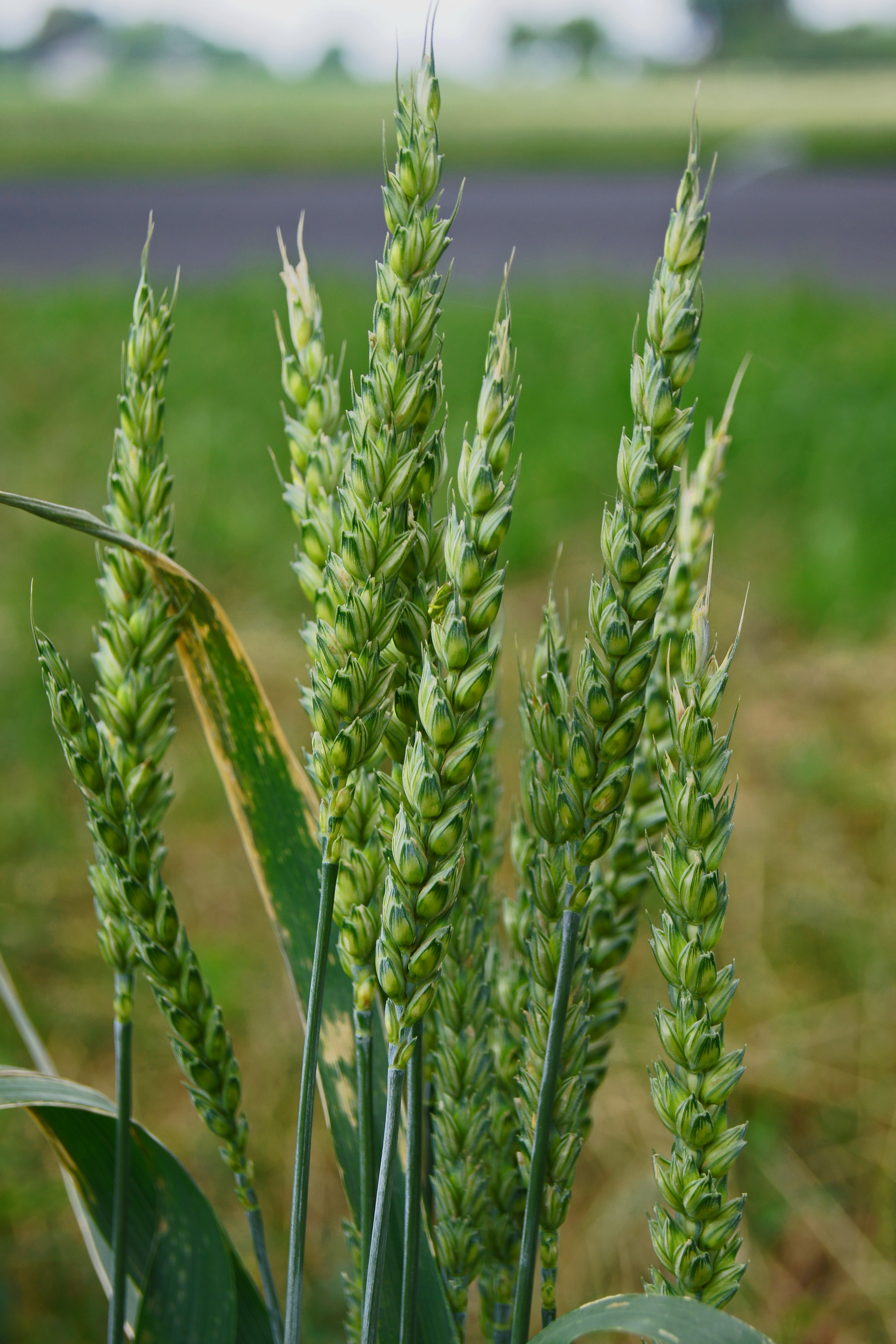
- Common wheat (Triticum aestivum)

Scientific classification
- Kingdom: Plantae
- Clade: Tracheophytes
- Clade: Angiosperms
- Clade: Monocots
- Clade: Commelinids
- Order: Poales; Small

Families
- See text

Diversity
- Over 23,700 species in about 1,017 genera.

= Poales =

Poales Temporal range: Late Cretaceous - Recent (but see text) 66–0 Ma

Order of monocotyledonous flowering plants

The Poales are a large order of flowering plants in the monocotyledons, and includes families of plants such as the grasses, bromeliads, rushes and sedges. 14 plant families are currently recognized by botanists to be part of Poales.

== Description ==
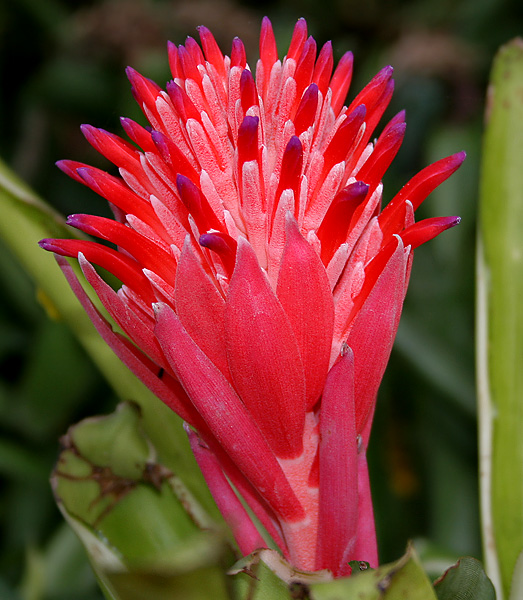
Billbergia pyramidalis of family Bromeliaceae

The flowers are typically small, enclosed by bracts, and arranged in inflorescences (except in three species of the genus Mayaca, which possess very reduced, one-flowered inflorescences). The flowers of many species are wind pollinated; the seeds usually contain starch.

== Taxonomy ==
The APG IV system (2016) accepts the order within a monocot clade called commelinids, with 14 families.

- Bromeliaceae (Bromeliads)
- Cyperaceae (Sedges)
- Ecdeiocoleaceae
- Eriocaulaceae (Pipewort family)
- Flagellariaceae
- Joinvilleaceae
- Juncaceae (Rushes)
- Mayacaceae
- Poaceae (Grasses, Bamboo, Reeds)
- Rapateaceae
- Restionaceae (Restiads, Restios, includes Anarthriaceae and Centrolepidaceae)
- Thurniaceae
- Typhaceae (Cattails)
- Xyridaceae (Yellow-eyed grass family)

The APG III system (2009) recognized Anarthriaceae and Centrolepidaceae as separate families, which APG IV includes in Restionaceae. The first APG system (1998) adopted the same placement of the order, although it used the spelling "commelinoids". It did not include the Bromeliaceae and Mayaceae, but had the additional families Prioniaceae (now included in Thurniaceae), Sparganiaceae (now in Typhaceae), and Hydatellaceae (now transferred out of the monocots; recently discovered to be an 'early-diverging' lineage of flowering plants).

The morphology-based Cronquist system did not include an order named Poales, assigning these families to the orders Bromeliales, Cyperales, Hydatellales, Juncales, Restionales and Typhales.

In early systems, an order including the grass family did not go by the name Poales but by a descriptive botanical name such as Graminales in the Engler system (update of 1964) and in the Hutchinson system (first edition, first volume, 1926), Glumiflorae in the Wettstein system (last revised 1935) or Glumaceae in the Bentham & Hooker system (third volume, 1883).

=== Evolution and phylogeny ===
The earliest fossils attributed to the Poales date to the late Cretaceous period about 66 million years ago, though some studies (e.g., Bremer, 2002) suggest the origin of the group may extend to nearly 115 million years ago, likely in South America. The earliest known fossils include pollen and fruits. They are distantly related to yams (genus Dioscorea) and lillies.

The phylogenetic position of Poales within the commelinids was difficult to resolve, but an analysis using complete chloroplast DNA found support for Poales as sister group of Commelinales plus Zingiberales. Major lineages within the Poales have been referred to as bromeliad, cyperid, xyrid, graminid, and restiid clades. A phylogenetic analysis resolved most relationships within the order but found weak support for the monophyly of the cyperid clade. The relationship between Centrolepidaceae and Restoniaceae within the restiid clade remains unclear; the first may actually be embedded in the latter.

- - Commelinales
  - Zingiberales
- Poales
  - Bromeliad clade
    - Bromeliaceae
    - Typhaceae
  - - - Cyperid clade
        - - Mayacaceae
          - Rapateaceae
        - - Thurniaceae
          - - Cyperaceae
            - Juncaceae
      - - Xyrid clade
          - Eriocaulaceae
          - Xyridaceae
        - - Graminid clade
            - Flagellariaceae
            - - Poaceae
              - - Ecdeiocoleaceae
                - Joinvilleaceae
          - Restiid clade
            - Anarthriaceae
            - - Centrolepidaceae
              - Restionaceae

=== Diversity ===
The four most species-rich families in the order are:

- Poaceae: 12,070 species
- Cyperaceae: 5,500 species
- Bromeliaceae: 3,170 species
- Eriocaulaceae: 1,150 species
Diversity of Poales

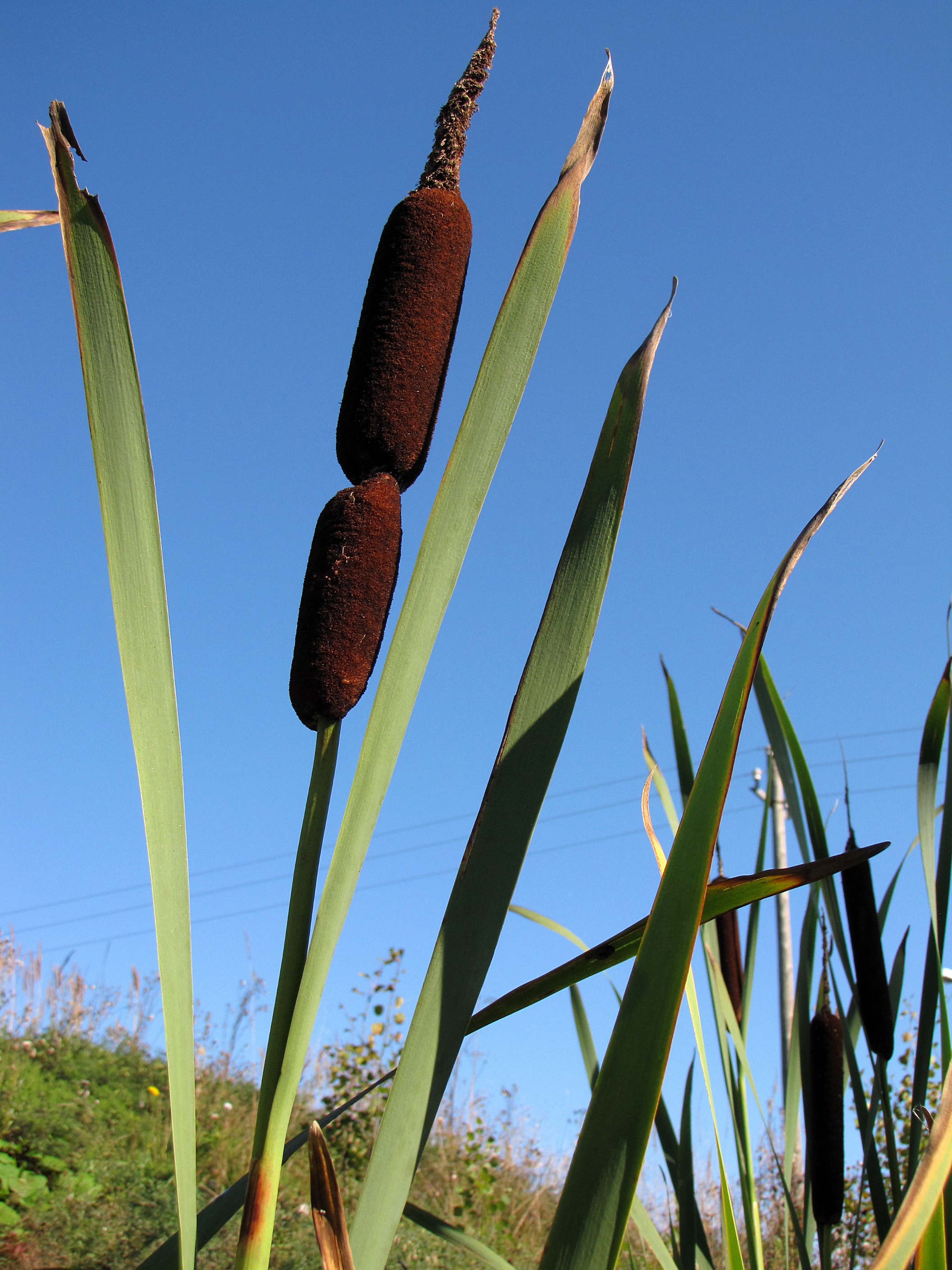
Typha latifolia, Typhaceae

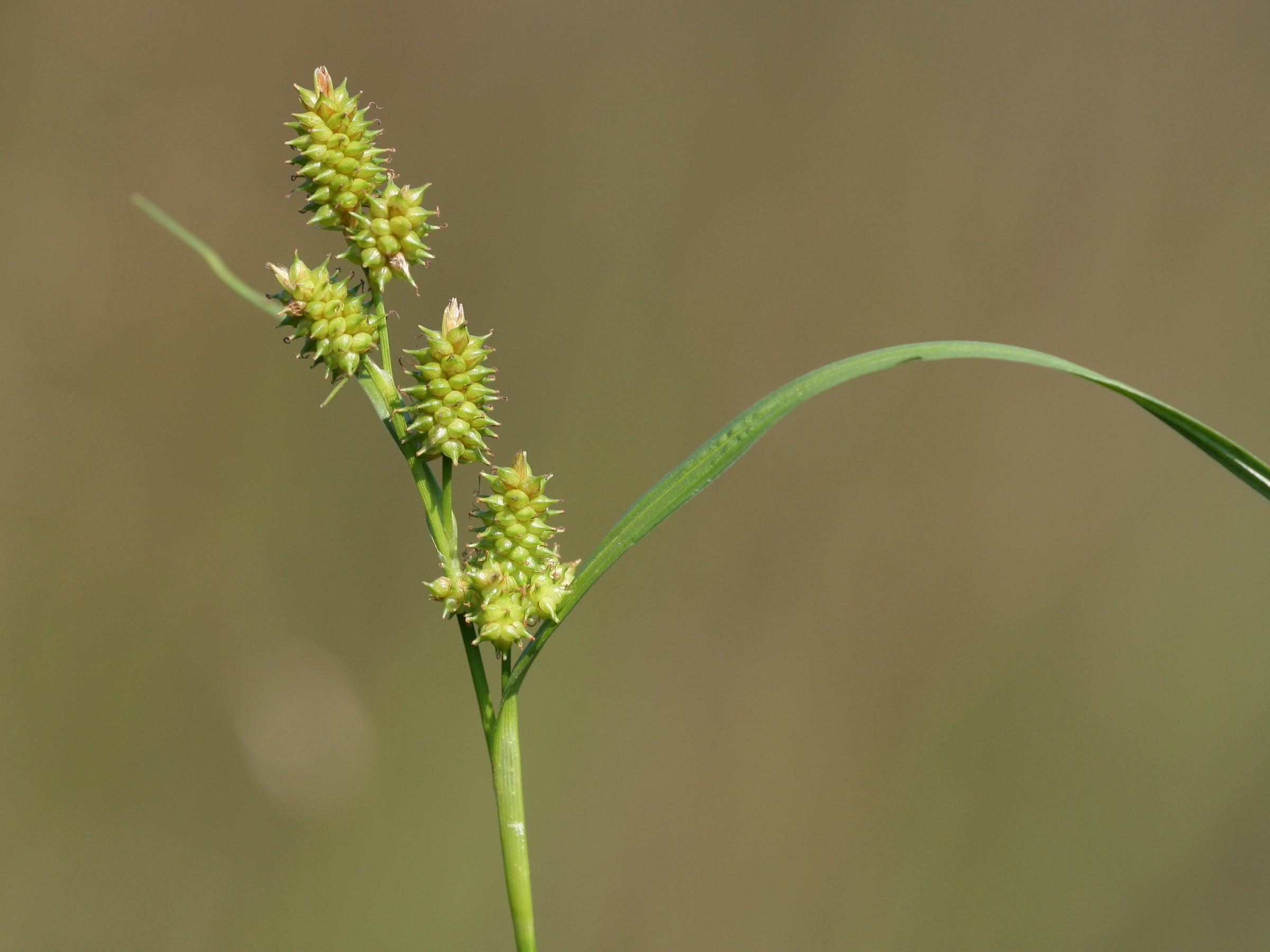
Carex demissa, Cyperaceae

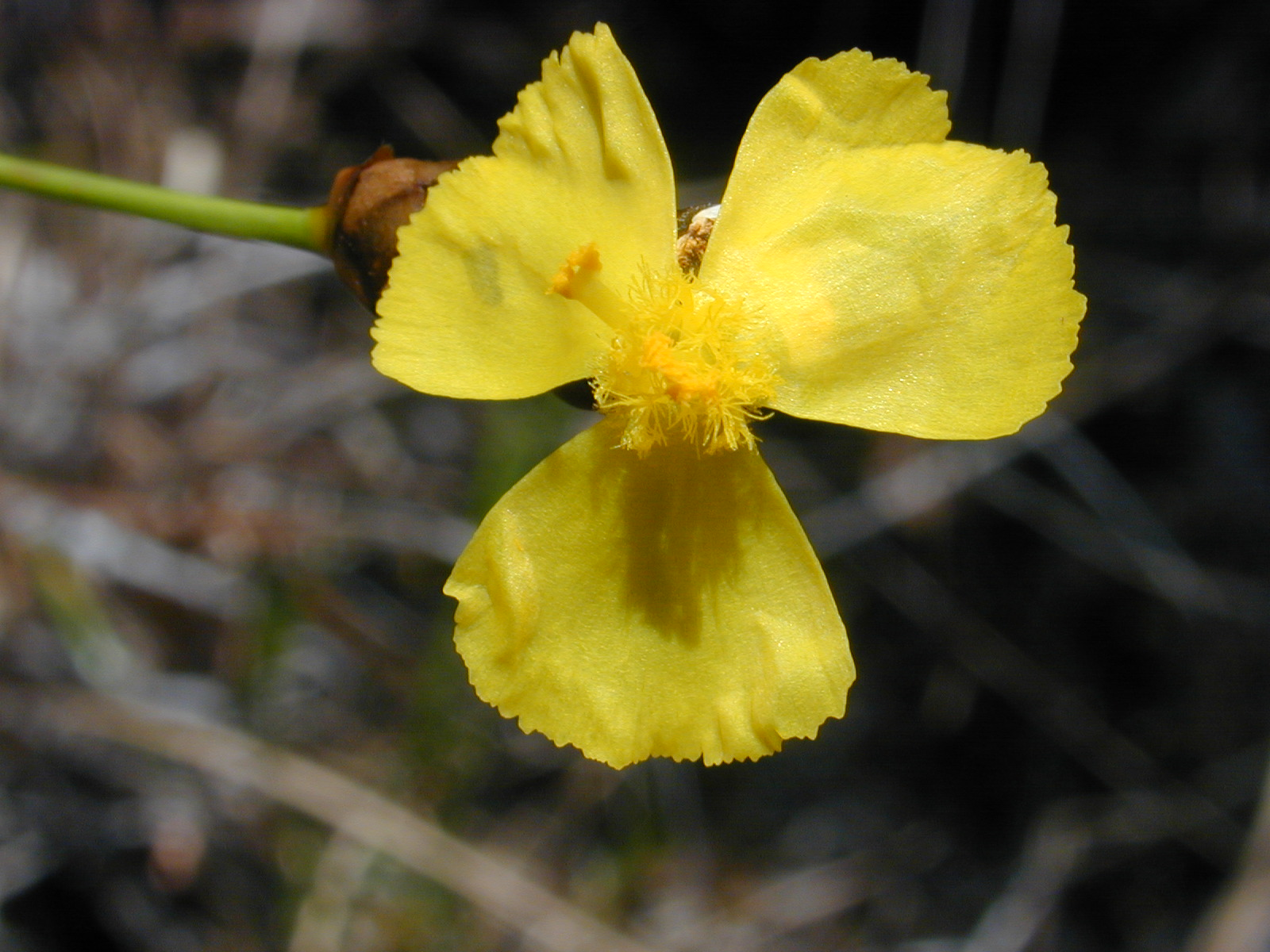
Xyris complanata, Xyridaceae

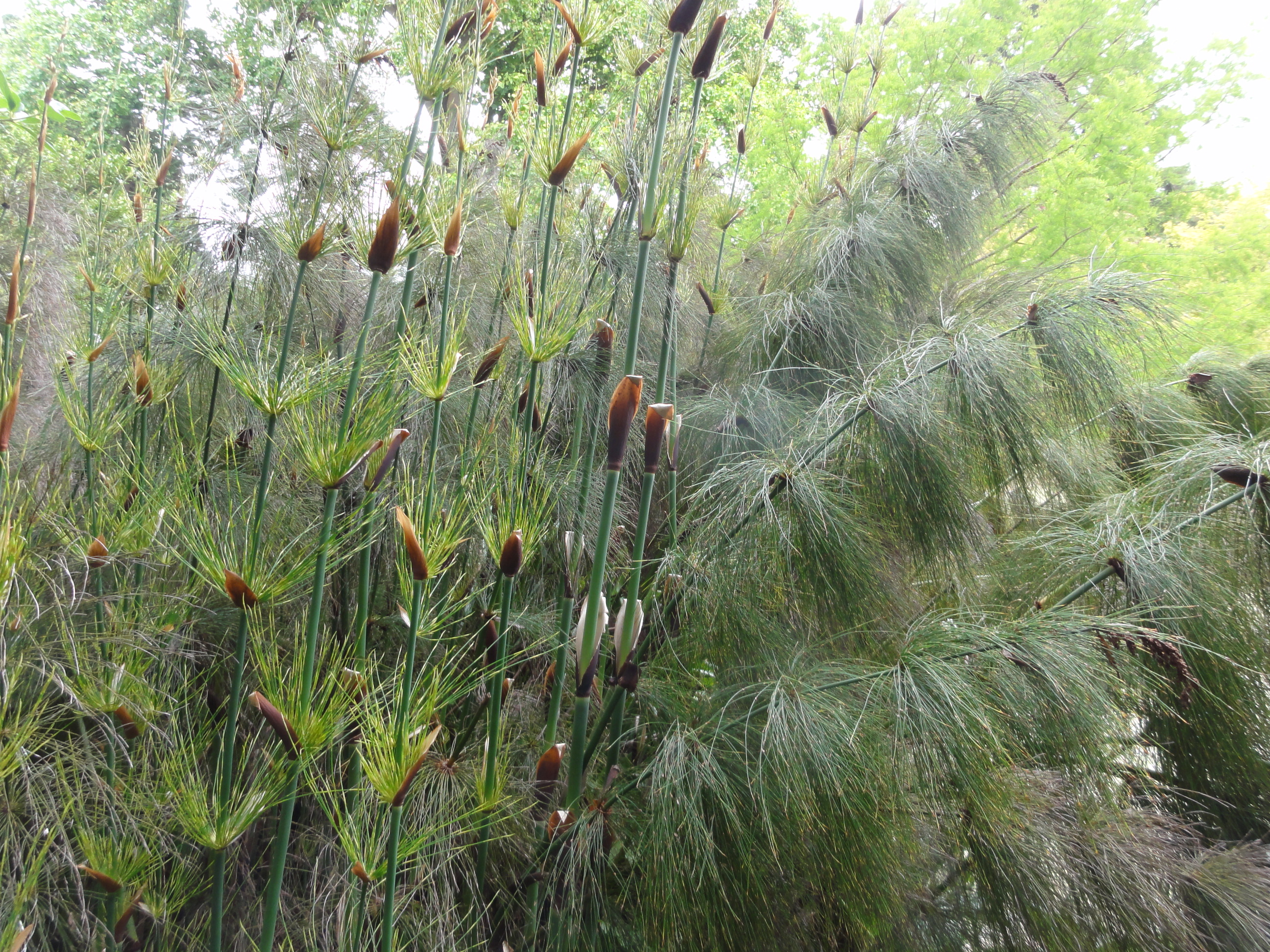
Elegia capensis, Restionaceae

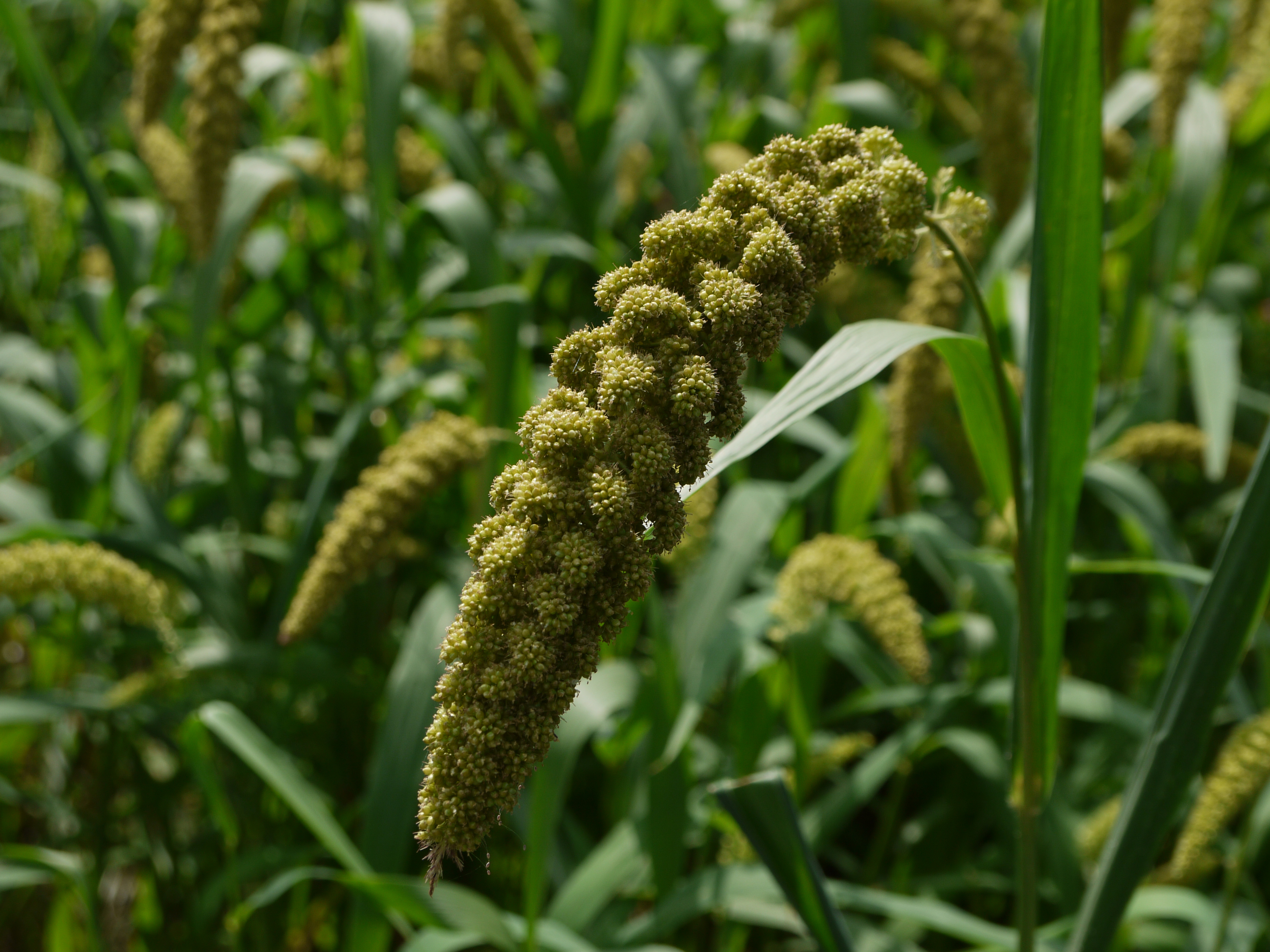
Foxtail millet, Poaceae

== Historic taxonomy ==
=== Cyperales ===
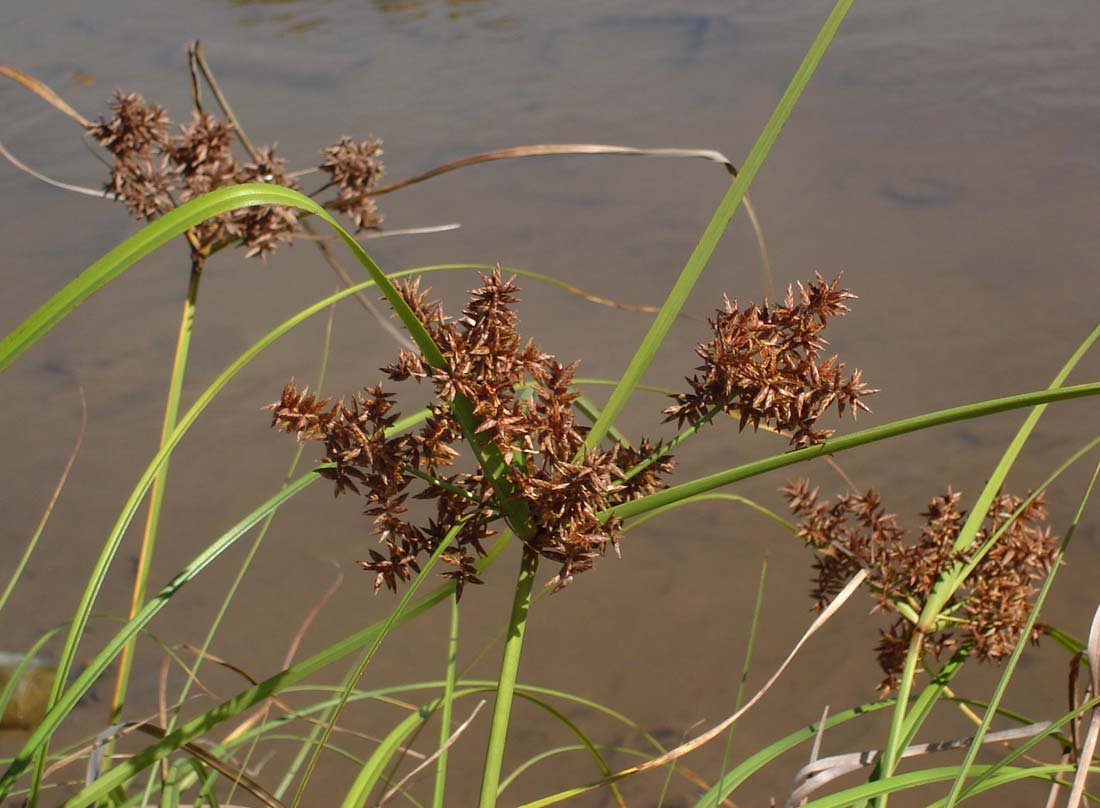
Cyperus javanicus

Cyperales was a name for an order of flowering plants. As used in the Engler system (update, of 1964) and in the Wettstein system it consisted of only the single family. In the Cronquist system it is used for an order (placed in subclass Commelinidae) and circumscribed as (1981):

- order Cyperales
  family Cyperaceae
  family Poaceae (or Gramineae)

The APG system now assigns the plants involved to the order Poales.

=== Eriocaulales ===
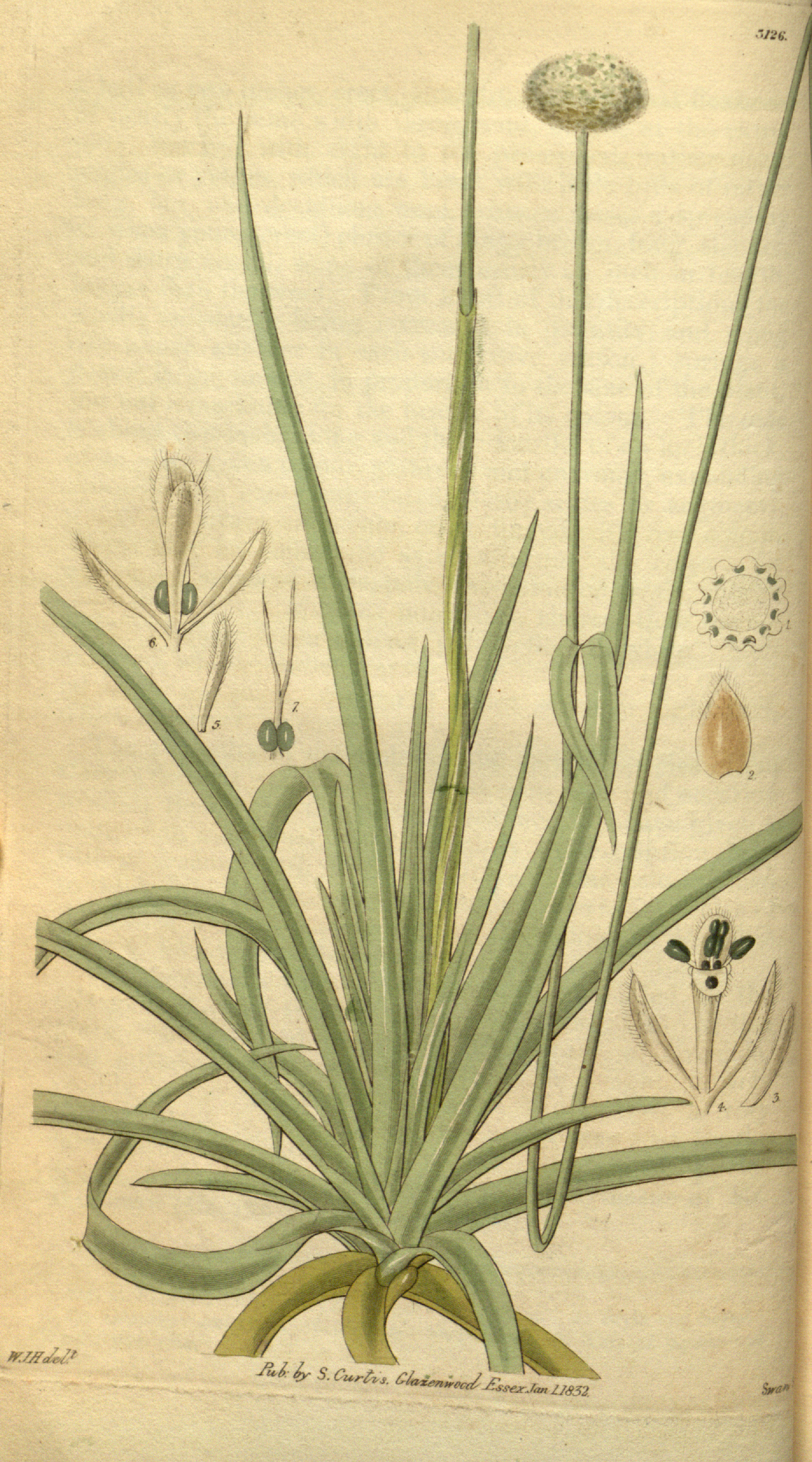
Eriocaulon decangulare

Eriocaulales is a botanical name for an order of flowering plants. The name was published by Takenoshin Nakai. In the Cronquist system the name was used for an order placed in the subclass Commelinidae. The order consisted of one family only (1981):

- order Eriocaulales
  - family Eriocaulaceae

The APG IV system now assigns these plants to the order Poales.

== Uses ==
The Poales are the most economically important order of monocots and possibly the most important order of plants in general. Within the order, by far the most important family economically is the family of grasses (Poaceae, syn. Gramineae), which includes the starch staples barley, maize, millet, rice, and wheat as well as bamboos (mostly used structurally, like wood, but somewhat as vegetables), and a few "seasonings" like sugarcane and lemongrass. Graminoids, especially the grasses, are typically dominant in open (low moisture but not yet arid, or also fire climax) habitats like prairie/steppe and savannah and thus form a large proportion of the forage of grazing livestock. Possibly due to pastoral nostalgia or simply a desire for open areas for play, they dominate most Western yards as lawns, which consume vast sums of money in upkeep (artificial grazing—mowing—for aesthetics and to keep the allergenic flowers suppressed, irrigation, and fertilizer). Many Bromeliaceae are used as ornamental plants (and one, the pineapple, is internationally grown in the tropics for fruit). Many wetland species of sedges, rushes, grasses, and cattails are important habitat plants for waterfowl, are used in weaving chair seats, and (especially cattails) were important pre-agricultural food sources for humans. Two sedges, chufa (Cyperus esculentus, also a significant weed) and water chestnut (Eleocharis dulcis) are still at least locally important wetland starchy root crops.

== Bibliography ==
- Bremer, K (2002). "Gondwanan Evolution of the Grass Alliance of Families (Poales)". Evolution. 56 (7): 1374–1387. doi:10.1111/j.0014-3820.2002.tb01451.x. PMID 12206239.
- Judd, W. S., C. S. Campbell, E. A. Kellogg, P. F. Stevens, M. J. Donoghue (2002). Plant Systematics: A Phylogenetic Approach, 2nd edition. pp. 276–292 (Poales). Sinauer Associates, Sunderland, Massachusetts. ISBN 0-87893-403-0 .
- Linder, H. Peter; Rudall, Paula J. (2005). "Evolutionary History of the Poales". Annual Review of Ecology, Evolution, and Systematics. 36: 107–124. doi:10.1146/annurev.ecolsys.36.102403.135635.
- Small, J. K. (1903). Flora of the Southeastern United States, 48. New York, United States
