= List of Canadian plants by genus XYZ =

This is a partial list of the plant species considered native to Canada.

Many of the plants seen in Canada were introduced, either intentionally or accidentally. For these plants, see List of introduced species to Canada.

N indicated native and X indicated exotic. Those plants whose status is unknown are marked with a ?.

Due to Canada's biodiversity, this page is divided.

== X ==
- Xanthium — cockleburs
  - Xanthium strumarium — rough cocklebur
- Xerophyllum — turkeybeard
  - Xerophyllum tenax — beargrass, western turkeybeard
- Xyris — yellow-eyed-grasses
  - Xyris difformis — Carolina yellow-eyed-grass
  - Xyris montana — northern yellow-eyed-grass

== Y ==
- Yabea — hedge-parsley
  - Yabea microcarpa — California hedge-parsley

== Z ==
- Zannichellia — horned pondweed
  - Zannichellia palustris — horned pondweed
- Zanthoxylum — prickly-ashes
  - Zanthoxylum americanum — northern prickly-ash
- Zeltnera — centauries
  - Zeltnera exaltata — tall centaury
- Zigadenus — camas
  - Zigadenus elegans — white camas
  - Zigadenus venenosus — meadow deathcamas
- Zizia — alexanders
  - Zizia aptera — golden alexanders
  - Zizia aurea — common alexanders
- Zostera — seagrasses
  - Zostera marina — sea-wrack
- Zygodon — mosses
  - Zygodon conoideus
  - Zygodon gracilis — slender yokemoss
  - Zygodon reinwardtii
  - Zygodon viridissimus — green yokemoss
