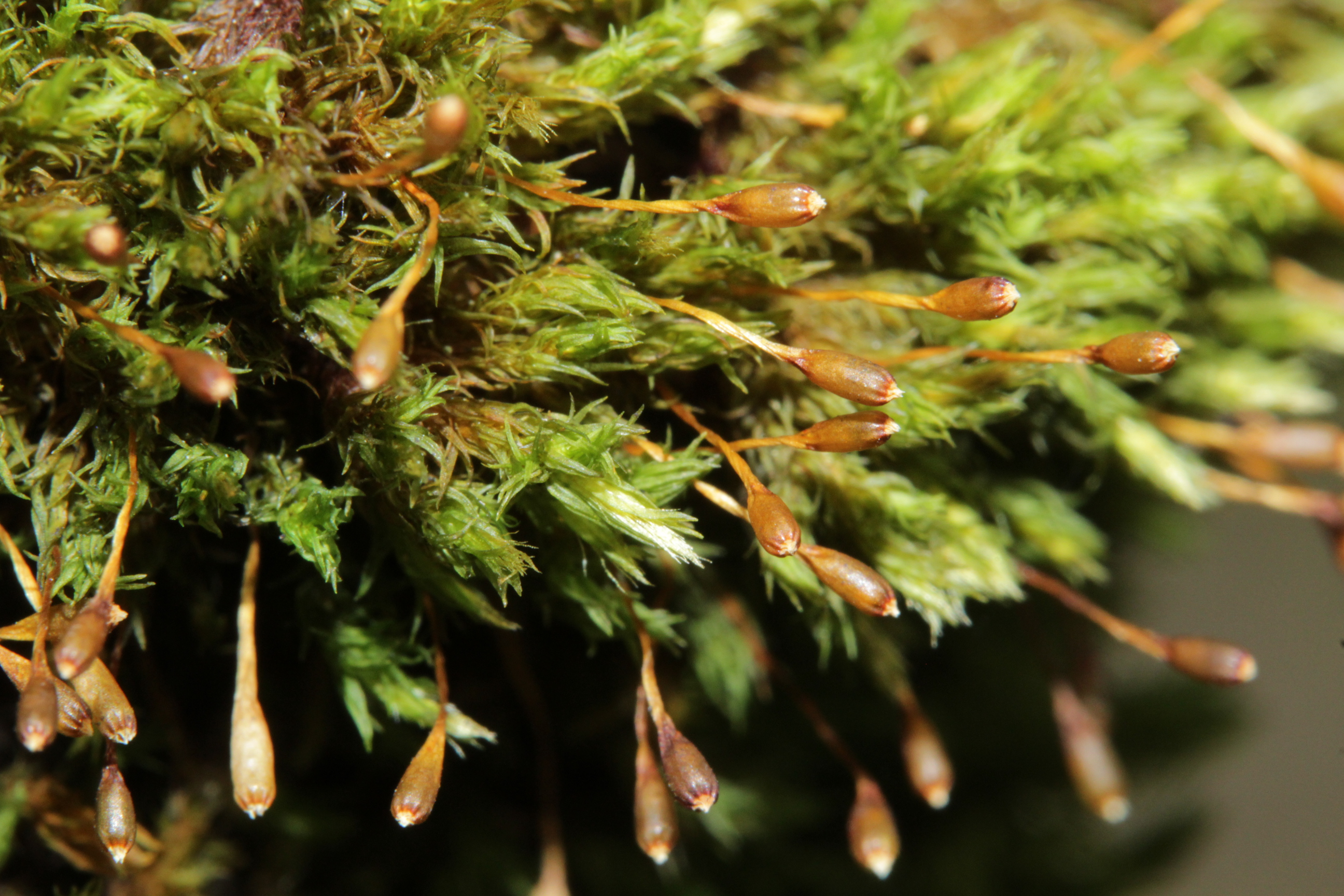
- Ulota coarctata

Scientific classification
- Kingdom: Plantae
- Division: Bryophyta
- Class: Bryopsida
- Subclass: Bryidae
- Order: Orthotrichales
- Family: Orthotrichaceae
- Genus: Ulota; Mohr

= Ulota =

Genus of mosses

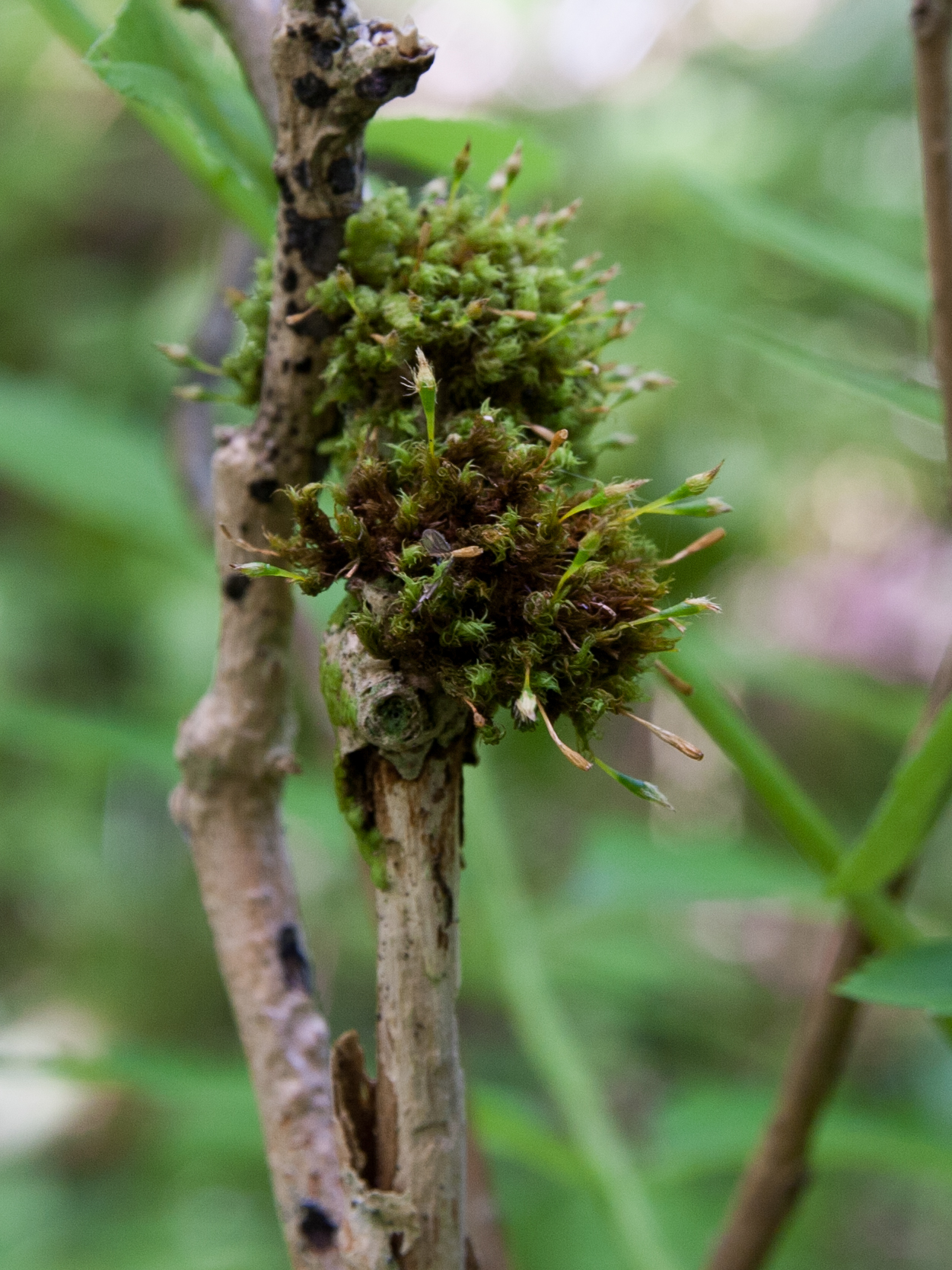
U. crispa growing as an epiphyte on a tree

Ulota is a genus of mosses comprising 69 species with a worldwide distribution, though most species are found in the southern hemisphere.

They have commonly been grouped within the genus Orthotrichum, though recently they have been placed in their own genus. Their phylogeny and taxonomy have been an area of debate ever since they were placed in their own genus, though it has been largely accepted to place Ulota as a genus of their own. They can be found growing on trees close to the coast, though some species are also found on rocks. Their shoots form small tufts to large mats across habitats, often intertwined with other mosses, including Orthotrichum species.

Ulota reproduce using sexual structures, sporangium (plural: sporangia), that are terminal on the shoot. The calyptra covering the developing sporangium can be hairy or not hairy depending on the species, but the hairs extend from the sporangium base to the apex as opposed to the calyptra hairs of Polytrichum mosses which extend from the apex to the base.

== Taxonomy ==
Due to morphological similarities, this genus has often been taxonomically clustered with the genus Orthotrichum, and has also been considered as a subgenus of Orthotrichum. Often, these two genus are found growing together. Mohr first segregated Ulota from Orthotrichum in 1806, though the segregation has been debated. The two distinguishing features were the splitting of the calyptra at the base and the curled edges of the leaves. However, some Orthotrichum species also have calyptrae which split at the base. Molecular data has made some progress as to differentiating the taxa, though certain morphological features can be distinguishing. Ulota have superficial stomata, whereas Orthotrichum have cryptoporous stomata. Other distinguishing features of Ulota include being monoicous, and the absence of asexual reproductive structures. There is one dioicous species U. phyllantha, and according to molecular studies it is closer related to other Ulota species than Orthotrichum species which can be dioicous. The hyaline cells at the base of the leaf margin also helps to distinguish between Orthotrichum and most Ulota species.

Recent genetic analysis of the mitochondrial genomes of species within Orthotrichum suggests the presence of seven genera within the taxon. The seven genera include: the genus Orthotrichum, which groups together the three previous subgenera Callistoma, Pulchella, and Orthotrichum; the genus Leratia, comprising the previous subgenus Exiguifolium; the genus Lewinskya, which includes the two previous subgenera Phaneroporum and Gymnoporus; the genus Pulvigera, comprising only one species, Orthotrichum lyelli; the genus Nyholmiella, composed of the previous subgenus Orthophyllum; the genus Plenogemma, composed of the single species U. phyllantha; and the genus Ulota, comprising all previous species classified as Ulota.

=== Species list ===
There are currently 69 recognized species of Ulota, over half of which occur only in the southern hemisphere. This number also includes Ulota phyllantha which has been proposed to reside within its own genus.

- Ulota angusti-limbata E.B. Bartram
- Ulota angustissima Müller Hal.
- Ulota aurantiaca Dusen ex Malta
- Ulota barclayi Mitt.
- Ulota bellii Malta
- Ulota billbuckii Garilleti, Mazimpaka & F. Lara
- Ulota breviseta Malta
- Ulota bruchii Hornsch.
- Ulota calvescens Wilson
- Ulota carinata Mitt.
- Ulota cervina Hoe & H.A. Crum
- Ulota coarctata (P. Beauv.) Hammar
- Ulota cochleata Venturi
- Ulota crispa (Hedw.) Bridel
- Ulota crispula Bruch
- Ulota curvifolia (Wahlenb.) Lilj.
- Ulota delicata Q.-H. Wang & Y. Jia
- Ulota dixonii Malta
- Ulota drummondii (Hook. & Grev.) Brid.
- Ulota ecklonii Hornsch. A. Jaeger
- Ulota eurystoma Nog.
- Ulota fernandeziana Malta
- Ulota fuegiana Mitt.
- Ulota fulva Brid.
- Ulota germana (Mont.) Mitt.
- Ulota gigantospora F. Lara, Caparrós & Garilleti
- Ulota glabella Mitt.
- Ulota gymnostoma Guo, Enroth & Virtanen
- Ulota hutchinsiae var. hutchinsiae (Sm.) Hammar
- Ulota hutchinsiae var. rufescens (E. Britton) Dixon
- Ulota japonica (Sull. & Lesq.) Mitt.
- Ulota larrainii Garilleti, Mazimpaka & F. Lara
- Ulota laticiliata Malta
- Ulota latisegmenta Q.-H. Wang & Y. Jia
- Ulota lativentrosa Müll. Hal. ex Malta
- Ulota longifolia Dixon & Sakurai
- Ulota lutea var. lutea (Hook. f. & Wilson) Mitt.
- Ulota lutea var. robusta Dixon ex Malta
- Ulota luteola (Hook. f. & Wilson) Mitt.
- Ulota macrocalycina Mitt.
- Ulota macrodontia Dusén ex Malta
- Ulota macrospora Baur & Warnst.
- Ulota magellanica (Mont.) A. Jaeger
- Ulota megalospora Venturi
- Ulota membranata Malta
- Ulota morrisonensis Horik.
- Ulota novae-seelandiaei Sainsbury
- Ulota novo-guinensis Bartram
- Ulota obtusiuscula Müll. Hal. & Kindb.
- Ulota perbreviseta Dixon & Sakurai
- Ulota perichaetialis (Sainsbury) Goffinet
- Ulota phyllantha Brid.
- Ulota phyllanthoides (Müll. Hal.) Kindb.
- Ulota pusilla Malta
- Ulota pycnophylla Dusén ex Malta
- Ulota pygmaeothecia (Müll. Hal.) Kindb.
- Ulota rehmannii Jur.
- Ulota reptans Mitt.
- Ulota rhytiore (B.H. Allen) F. Lara, Garilleti, Albertos & Mazimpaka
- Ulota robusta Mitt.
- Ulota rubella E.B. Bartram
- Ulota rufula (Mitt.) A. Jaeger
- Ulota schmidii (Müll. Hal.) Mitt.
- Ulota splendida E.B. Bartram
- Ulota streptodon Garilleti, Mazimpaka & F. Lara
- Ulota ventricosa (Müll. Hal.) Malta
- Ulota viridis Venturi
- Ulota yakushimensis Z. Iwatsuki
- Ulota yunnanensis F. Lara, Caparrós & Garilleti

== Description ==
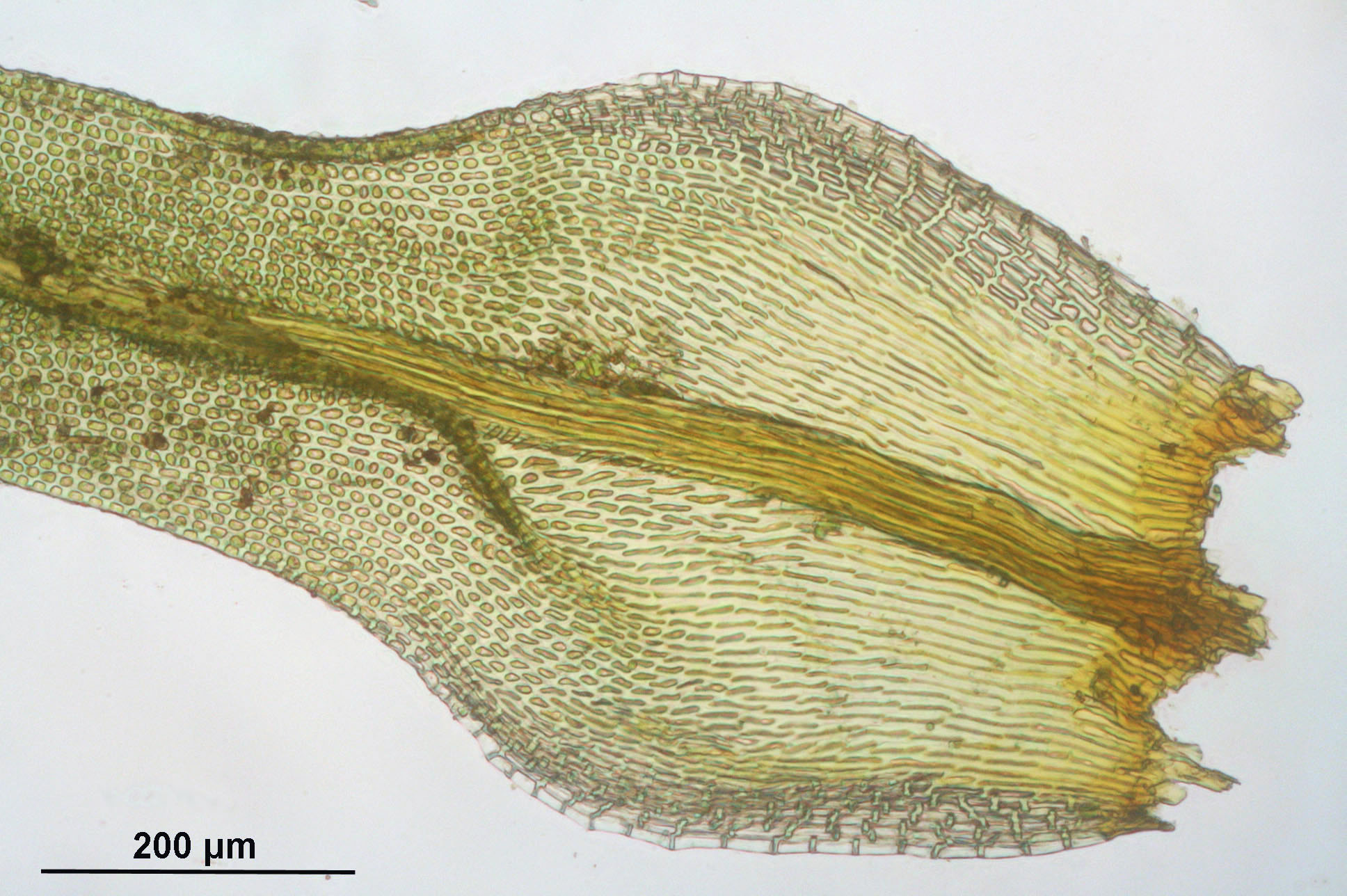
Light microscopy of a leaf of U. bruchii showing the rectangular hyaline cells along the margin of the leaf.

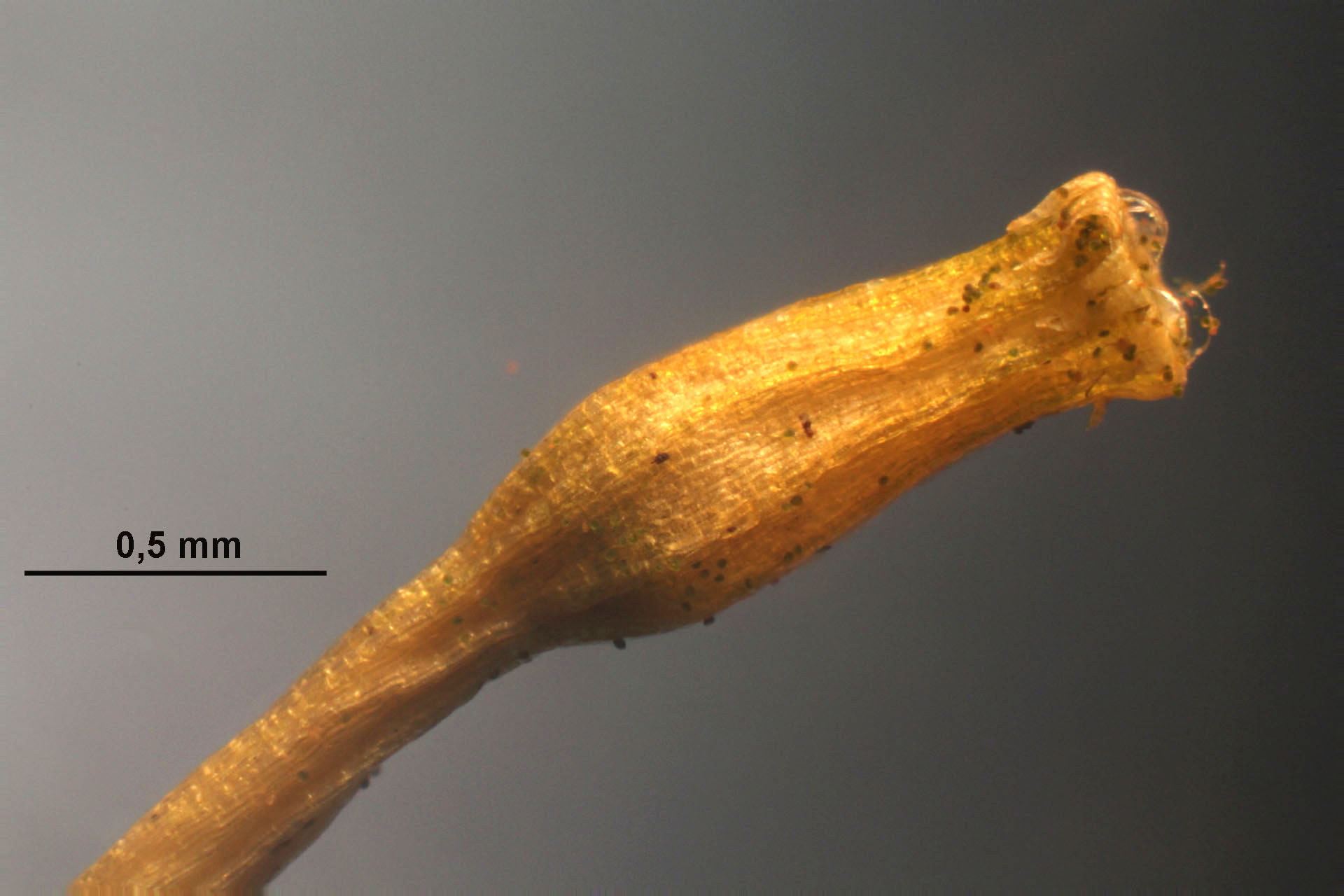
A mature sporangium of U. crispa showing the ribs along the sporangium wall.

Ulota mosses tend to grow in a tuft on the substrate, with the shoots growing in an acrocarpous fashion with the shoots standing up. The tufts can vary in colour, ranging from a deep green at the top of the tuft to a darker brown/red at the base of the cushion. The oblong to linear-lanceolate leaves are attached to an erect stem, and can be slightly flexed to fully curled when dry. The genus is characterized by the slightly to fully curled leaves when dry. The leaves have a costa, or midrib, which runs the entire length of the leaf. The leaves have hyaline cells at the basal margins of the leaves, which are typically square or rectangular shaped. The leaf base can be expanded or gradually tapered as it connects to the stem. At the tip of the leaves, there are cells with very thick cell walls. At maturity, the sporangia can be ribbed or unribbed. The sporangia sit on top of a seta, which holds it above the gametophyte. Between species of Ulota, there is variation in the length of the seta which can be a useful trait in classifying species. The sporangia have peristome teeth are diplolepidous, with 8 to 16 exostome teeth and 8 endostome teeth. The sporangia sit on top of a seta which attaches to the gametophyte at the apex of the shoot. The calyptra covers the developing sporangium and is typically conic, split at the base, and can be naked or hairy. The rhizoids are placed at the base of them stem, occasionally appearing along the stem, and are smooth.

== Habitat and distribution ==
Ulota species occur typically in temperate climates, growing as an epiphyte on tree trunks. Some species have also been known to extend into the tropics and subarctic environments. Multiple species can grow together in a habitat, often intertwined with each other. The genus is typically found in temperate, humid, oceanic coasts, though some species are also found in montane environments in the tropics and subtropics. Their habitat is found to be heavily determined by the available substrate, but also on the dispersal ability of the species and the dispersal obstacles that are present. The species which tend to be correlated with the presence of Ulota species include: Salix caprea, Populus tremula, Fraxinus excelsior, Sorbus aucuparia, and Acer pseudoplatanus. They can also be found growing on rocks, though this is reportedly less common. Two species, U. crispa and U. bruchii, tend to be found together, though U. crispa tends to be more common along the coast.

Within their distribution, four areas have the highest rates of endemism for Ulota species: Papua New Guinea (75%), Subtropical China (77.8%), Southern Australasia (78.6%), and South America (81.8%). South America also has the highest richness of Ulota species with 22 recorded species. The next richest area is Australasia with 14 recognized species.

== Lifecycle ==
Lifecycle of a typical moss. Ulota species follow this general lifecycle.

Like other bryophytes, show an alternation of generations. The vegetative gametophyte generation is haploid, and is dominant for most of the life history. Most plants are dioicous except for U. phyllantha, which is monoicous. Asexual reproduction is uncommon, except in U. phyllantha, in which asexual propagules can commonly be found at the leaf apex.

Sexual reproduction involves the transfer of sperm from the antheridium (plural: antheridia) via water. Drops of water carrying sperm allow for the fertilization of the egg housed within the archegonium (plural: archegonia). The heads of the archegonia have a mucilage which attracts the sperm, and the degeneration of the neck canal allows for the passage of sperm to the egg, resulting in fertilization. The fertilized egg develops into a sporophyte, which is diploid, and protected by a remnant of the archegonium now known as the calyptra. Inside the developing sporangium, haploid spores are generated via meiosis. The seta raises the sporangium into the air, and once the sporangium is mature, the operculum falls off and the spores are released into the wind. The peristome teeth are hygroscopic and move in relation to the moisture content of the air, which allows for spores to be released over a longer period of time. Once mature, the sporangia are typically 8-ribbed, though in some species the ribs are only clearly visible right at the base of the peristome mouth.

Spores can be unicellular, although there five known species in which multicellular spores have been identified. Endosporic germination is the process in which mitosis occurs within the sporeling before the spore is released, and once released, it is considered a multicellular spore. This kind of germination is known in all three lineages of bryophytes: liverworts, hornworts, and mosses. Once the spores have landed on suitable substrata, protonematal threads will begin to grow, followed by rhizoids which will help attach the developing plant to the substrate. The leafy shoot develops soon after, reaching upwards towards light.

== Conservation ==
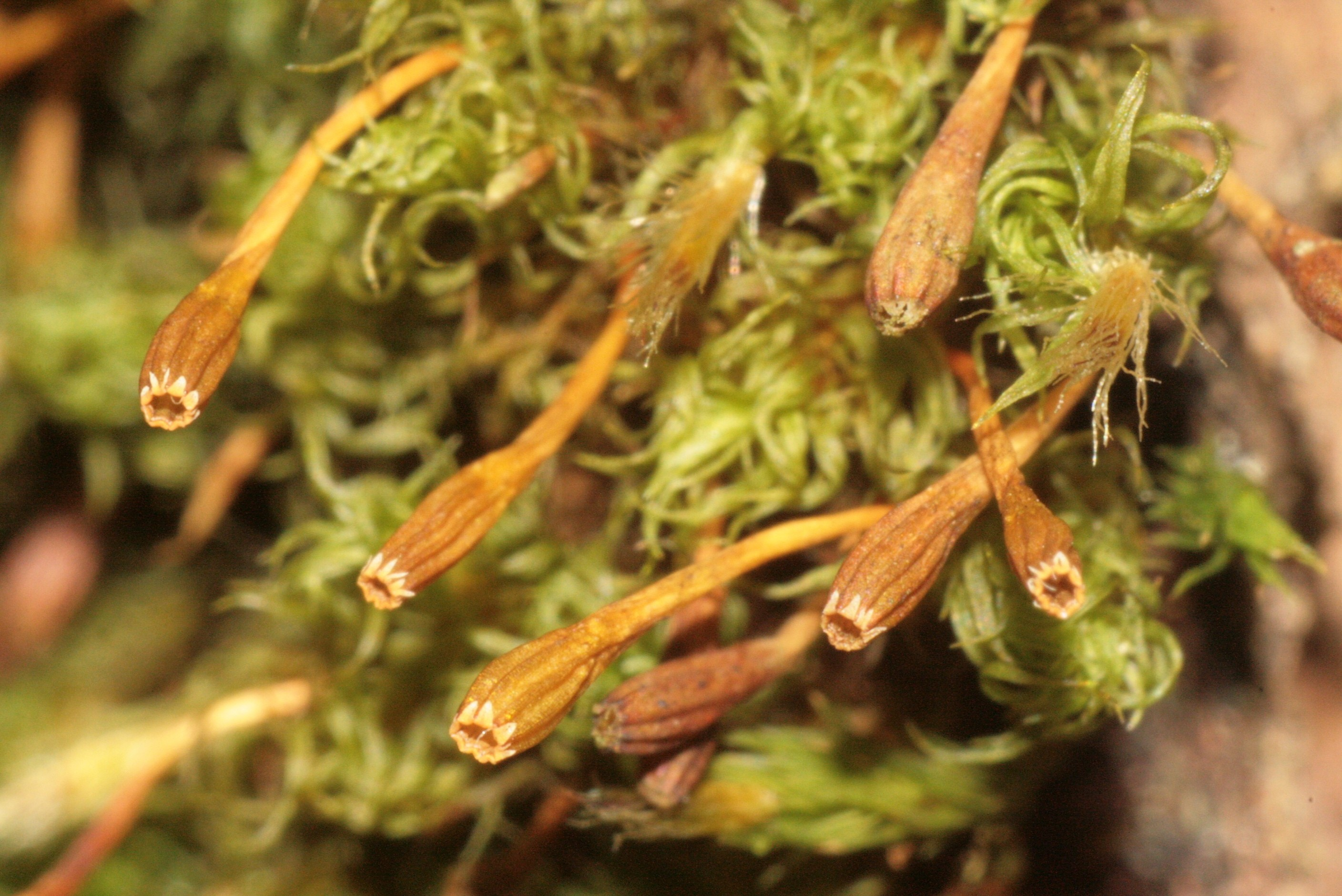
U. bruchii

Of the 69 recognized species, three of the species have been assessed by the IUCN. Native to northwestern Europe and Serbia, U. calvescens shows an increasing population trend and is listed "least concerned". There is one protected area within its range, and it is listed as vulnerable in Portugal, Spain, and Serbia, and data deficient in Norway. U. bruchii is found throughout northern and western Europe, with a few pockets in eastern Europe and is listed as "least concerned". U. macrospora exists in a small area within central Europe, and is listed as "endangered". It has a small population size and the current threats it faces includes a decline in habitat area and lowering of habitat quality. Declines in air quality have also been correlated with declines in the size of the tufts of this genus found on trees in urban areas.

== Uses ==
Ulota crispa and U. megalospora have both been found to be intolerant of high levels of sulfur dioxide, which may indicate both species' use as an air quality indicator.
