= Orthotrichum casasianum =

Conservation status
- Critically Endangered (IUCN 3.1)

Scientific classification
- Kingdom: Plantae
- Division: Bryophyta
- Class: Bryopsida
- Subclass: Bryidae
- Order: Orthotrichales
- Family: Orthotrichaceae
- Genus: Orthotrichum
- Species: O. casasianum

Binomial name
- Orthotrichum casasianum F.Lara, Garilleti & Mazimpaka (1999)

Species of moss

Orthotrichum casasianum is a species of moss in the family Orthotrichaceae. It is endemic to the Spanish province of Álava, in the Basque Country. It grows in less than 200 trees on the banks of the Bayas river. The species is critically endangered, and was added in 2013 to the Basque Catalog of Threatened Species.

== Description ==
Orthotrichum casasianum is a small epiphytic moss forming loose, olive-green cushions up to about 20 mm across, with individual shoots 6–10 mm tall. The leaves are erect and become slightly flexuose (gently zigzag) when dry, measuring 2.0–2.8 mm long by 0.4–0.6 mm wide. They are linear-lanceolate to linear-oblong, with margins recurved (rolled under) for much of their length. Leaf tips are broadly rounded or obtuse, often concave, and typically bear a minute one- or two-celled mucro (tiny hair-like point). Upper leaf cells are thick-walled and either smooth or bear very low papillae (small bumps), whereas basal cells are larger, transparent (hyaline), thin-walled and rectangular.

Reproductive structures occur on autoicous plants (bearing both male and female organs on the same shoot). Sporophytes have short setae (stalks) 0.4–0.6 mm long, carrying emergent urn-shaped capsules up to 2 mm in length. When dry, these capsules are cylindrical-urceolate (barrel-shaped) with eight distinct longitudinal ribs and hemicryptoporous stomata (pores half-hidden in the capsule wall) around the upper half. The double peristome (ring of "teeth" around the mouth) comprises an outer layer of sixteen teeth fused into eight pairs; each tooth shows a reticulate (network-like) pattern of low papillae externally and is almost smooth internally. The inner peristome consists of sixteen smooth, markedly incurved segments. The protective calyptra (cap) is naked, smooth and distinctly folded.

== Distribution and habitat ==
At the time of its original publication, this species was known only from two well-preserved riparian woodlands along the Bayas River in Álava, northern Spain. It grows as an epiphyte on the bark of Alnus glutinosa (black alder), Sambucus nigra (elder), Fraxinus excelsior (ash) and Corylus avellana (hazel) in humid, eurosiberian-climate forests that experience periodic flooding. Similar humid woodland habitats in the Cantabrian Mountains and western Pyrenees may harbour additional populations.

== Taxonomy ==
Orthotrichum casasianum was first formally described in 1999 by F. Lara, R. Garilleti and V. Mazimpaka following the study of fruiting specimens collected from riparian woodlands in Álava, northern Spain. The authors placed it within the family Orthotrichaceae, and specifically assigned it to subgenus Pulchella (section Pulchella) on account of its emergent, ribbed capsules and the characteristic structure of its peristome (the ring of teeth around the capsule mouth). The specific epithet honours the distinguished Iberian bryologist Creu Casas for her contributions to the study of mosses in Spain.

Within subgenus Pulchella, O. casasianum is most closely allied to the Holarctic scanicum complex—especially O. scanicum and O. lewinskyae—sharing features such as a cylindric-urn-shaped (urceolate) capsule with hemicryptoporous stomata and a double peristome. It can, however, be readily distinguished by its consistently brown, ventricose (swollen-at-the-base) capsules; broadly rounded, often concave leaf apices tipped with a tiny hyaline (transparent) apiculus; and the faint reticulation of its exostome teeth rather than the dense papillae seen in similar taxa. Although superficially similar to the variable O. pallens (placed in section Diaphana), O. casasianum differs in its slender, loosely foliose shoots, more incurved leaf tips when dry, and the uniform colouration of its capsule and seta.
