= Ulota yakushimensis =

Scientific classification
- Kingdom: Plantae
- Division: Bryophyta
- Class: Bryopsida
- Subclass: Bryidae
- Order: Orthotrichales
- Family: Orthotrichaceae
- Genus: Ulota
- Species: U. yakushimensis

Binomial name
- Ulota yakushimensis Z.Iwats.

Species of moss

Ulota yakushimensis is a species of moss in the family Orthotrichaceae. It is native to Japan.
