= Orthotrichum striatum =

Scientific classification
- Kingdom: Plantae
- Division: Bryophyta
- Class: Bryopsida
- Subclass: Bryidae
- Order: Orthotrichales
- Family: Orthotrichaceae
- Genus: Orthotrichum
- Species: O. striatum

Binomial name
- Orthotrichum striatum Hedwig, 1801

Species of moss

Orthotrichum striatum is a species of moss belonging to the family Orthotrichaceae.

It has cosmopolitan distribution.
