= Elsa Nyholm =

Swedish botanist

- Born: Elsa Tufvesson; 1911; Nordanå, Scania, Sweden
- Died: 2002 (aged 90–91)
- Scientific career
- Fields: Botany; Bryology
- Institutions: Lund University; Swedish Museum of Natural History
- Author abbrev. (botany): Nyholm

Elsa Cecilia Nyholm (née Tufvesson) (1911–2002) was the foremost Swedish bryologist of the twentieth century, a botanist, and researcher at Lund University and the Swedish Museum of Natural History.

== Biography ==
Elsa Nyholm was born on a farm in Nordanå in rural Scania, southernmost Sweden. Despite a strong interest in natural history, she was not allowed to attend grammar school. Instead, she went to handicraft and household schools and developed her interest in nature on the side. She was influenced by John Persson, a pharmacist and botanist who specialised in bryology. In 1932, she got a job as museum assistant at the Lund University botanical museum. There, she developed her plant identification skills, specialising in bryology, and contacts with botanists around the world. She realised that a grand moss flora of Northern Europe would be a valuable resource. Although lacking a formal academic degree, she found support at the Swedish Museum of Natural History in Stockholm and received Swedish Natural Science Research Council grants from 1954 to 1964 to undertake the work. This included travel to other countries, such as Ireland in 1957 to meet other bryologists as well as field work. She also collected bryophytes in Turkey.

From 1964 to her retirement, she was the head curator of the moss herbarium at the Swedish Museum of Natural History. This comprised over 700,000 specimens at that time. She continued to work at the museum after her retirement, producing the Illustrated Flora of Nordic Mosses by 1998.

Elsa Nyholm's name is particularly associated with her two grand moss floras, the Illustrated Moss Flora of Fennoscandia, written in English and published in 6 volumes from 1954 until 1969 and Illustrated Flora of Nordic Mosses published in 4 volumes from 1987 to 1998. These are used by bryologists across Europe and North America. She had a lasting collaboration with the British bryologist Alan Crundwell.

== Honors and Legacy ==
Nyholm was awarded an honorary doctorate by the University of Lund in 1969 and was also made an honorary member of the British Bryological Society, the Nordic Bryological Society, and the Swedish Botanical Society.

The bryophyte genus Nyholmiella (Orthotrichaceae) is named in her honour.

== Selected scientific works ==
- A study on Campylium hispidulum and related species. Transactions of the British Bryological Society 4 (1962): 194–200. Crundwell AC, Nyholm E.
- A revision of Weissia, subgenus Astomum. I. The European species. Journal of Bryology 7 (1972): 7–19. Crundwell AC, Nyholm E.
- Illustrated Moss Flora of Fennoscandia. II. Musci. Fasc. 1 (1954)
- Illustrated Moss Flora of Fennoscandia. II. Musci. Fasc. 2 (1956)
- Illustrated Moss Flora of Fennoscandia. II. Musci. Fasc. 3 (1958)
- Illustrated Moss Flora of Fennoscandia. II. Musci. Fasc. 4 (1960)
- Illustrated Moss Flora of Fennoscandia. II. Musci. Fasc. 5 (1965)
- Illustrated Moss Flora of Fennoscandia. II. Musci. Fasc. 6 (1969)
- Studies in the genus Atrichum P. Beauv. A short survey of the genus and the species. Lindbergia 1 (1971): 1–33.
- Illustrated Flora of Nordic Mosses. Fasc. I. Fissidentaceae–Seligeriaceae (1987)
- Illustrated Flora of Nordic Mosses. Fasc. 2. Pottiaceae–Sphlachnaceae–Schistostegaceae (1991)
- Illustrated Flora of Nordic Mosses. Fasc. 3. Bryaceae–Rhodobryaceae–Mniaceae–Cinclidiaceae–Plagiomniaceae (1993)
- Illustrated Flora of Nordic Mosses. Fasc. 4. Aulacomniaceae–Meesiaceae–Catoscopiaceae–Bartramiaceae–Timmiaceae–Encalyptaceae–Grimmiaceae–Ptychomitriaceae–Hedwigiaceae–Ortotrichaceae (1998)
