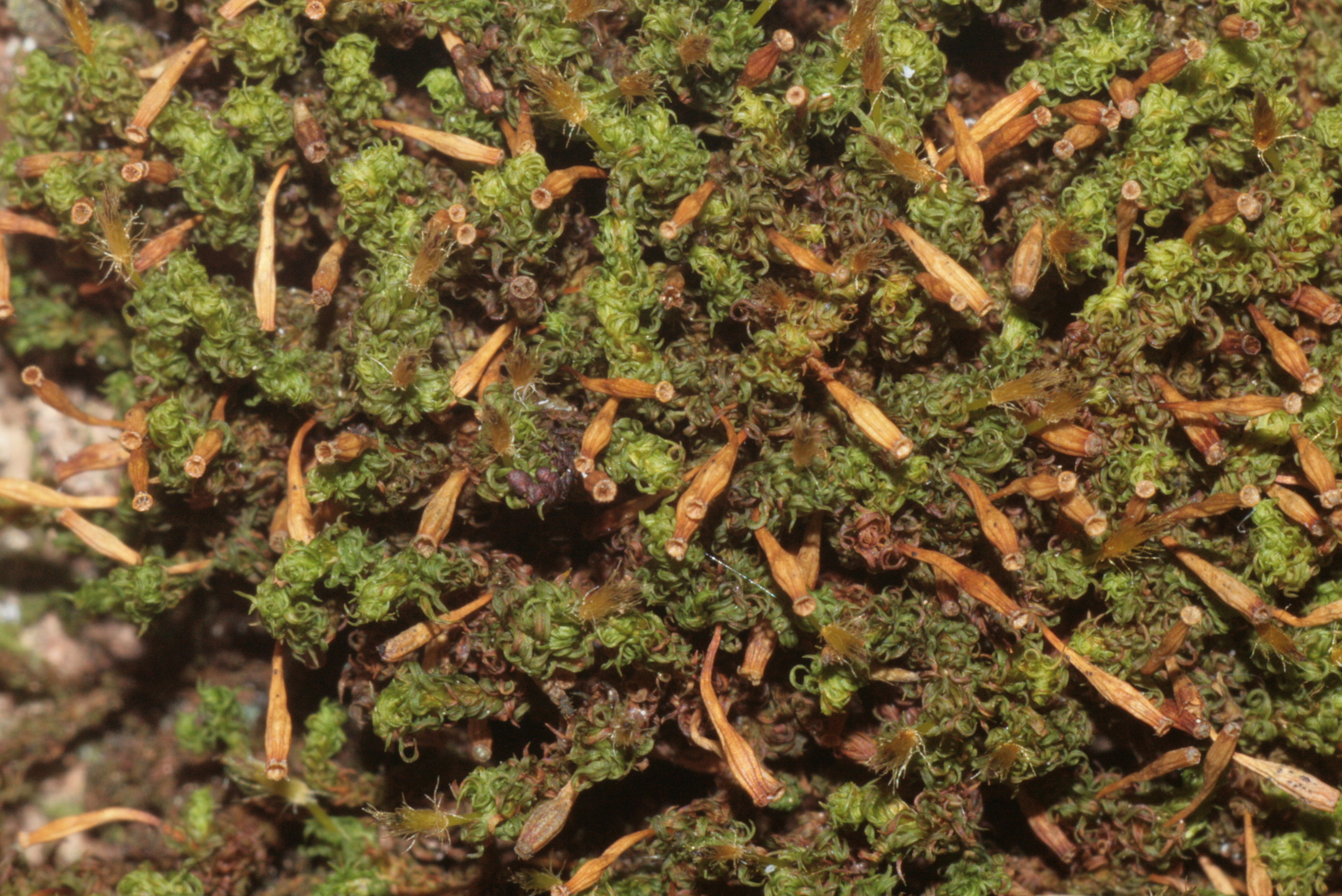

Scientific classification
- Kingdom: Plantae
- Division: Bryophyta
- Class: Bryopsida
- Subclass: Bryidae
- Order: Orthotrichales
- Family: Orthotrichaceae
- Genus: Ulota
- Species: U. crispa

Binomial name
- Ulota crispa Hedw.

= Ulota crispa =

Species of moss

Ulota crispa, the crisped pincushion moss, is a species of acrocarpous moss in the genus Ulota native to eastern North America. It is generally found in tight mounds on tree bark.
