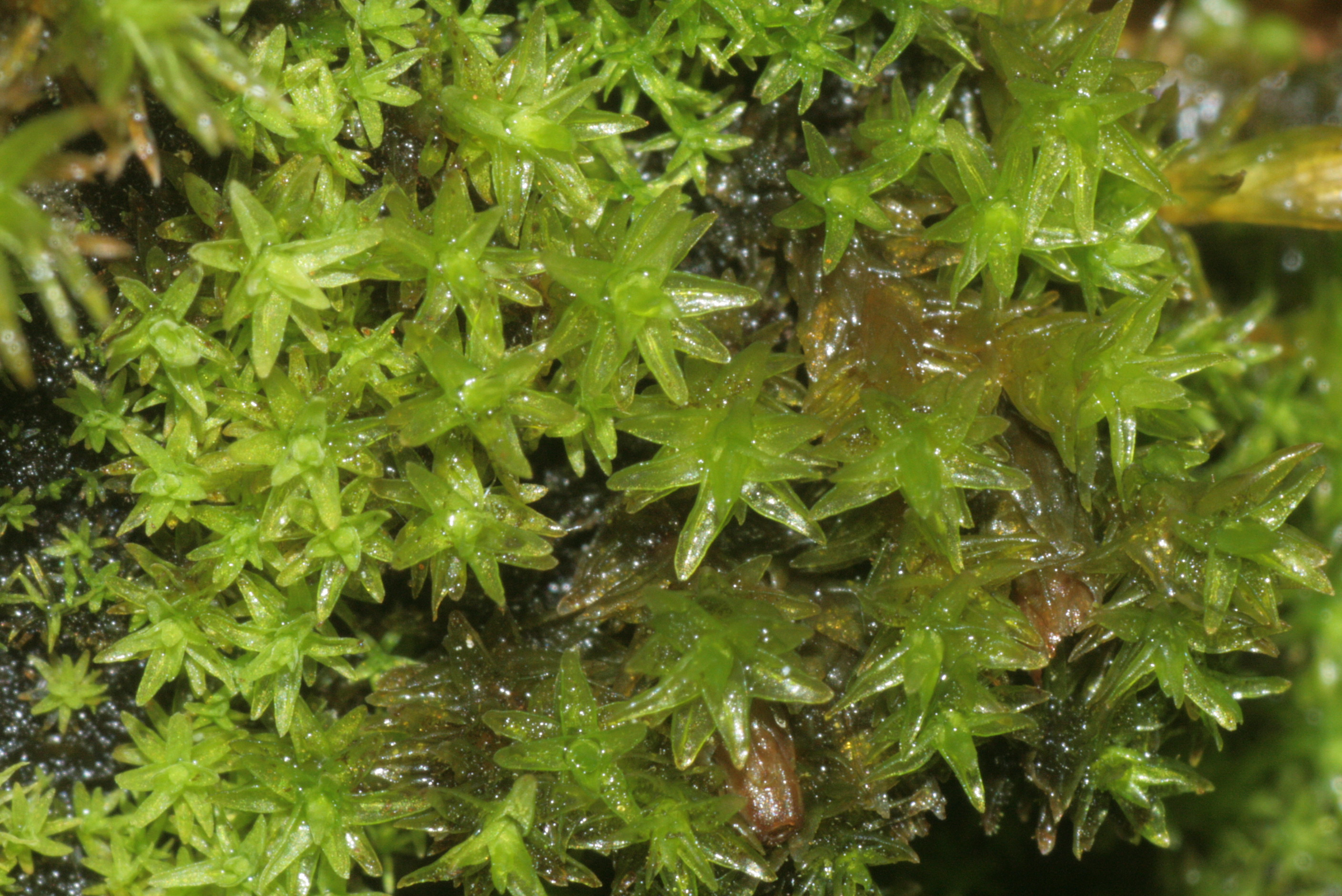

Scientific classification
- Kingdom: Plantae
- Division: Bryophyta
- Class: Bryopsida
- Subclass: Bryidae
- Order: Orthotrichales
- Family: Orthotrichaceae
- Genus: Nyholmiella
- Species: N. obtusifolia

Binomial name
- Nyholmiella obtusifolia (Brid.) Holmen & E.Warncke (1969)

Synonyms
- List: Orthotrichum obtusifolium Schrad. ex Brid. (1801); Orthotrichum inflexum Müll. Hal.

= Nyholmiella obtusifolia =

Species of moss

Nyholmiella obtusifolia (basionym Orthotrichum obtusifolium) is a species of moss in the family Orthotrichaceae. An epiphytic species which grows on bark or sometimes stone. This species has a widespread northern distribution, known from Eurasia and North America.

This species can be distinguished from its family members via its non-revolute leaf margins containing 1-2 papilla per cell.
