= Nyholmiella =

Scientific classification
- Kingdom: Plantae
- Division: Bryophyta
- Class: Bryopsida
- Subclass: Bryidae
- Order: Orthotrichales
- Family: Orthotrichaceae
- Genus: Nyholmiella; Holmen & E.Warncke, 1969

Genus of mosses

Nyholmiella is a genus of mosses belonging to the family Orthotrichaceae.

Originally the two species were places in the genus Orthotrichum and in 1885 classified as a separate subgenus. Then in 1908 they were assigned to Stroemia, but this was deemed illegitimate and renamed to Nyholmiella named after Swedish botanist Elsa Nyholm.

== Species ==
- Nyholmiella gymnostoma (Bruch ex Brid.) Holmen & E.Warncke
- Nyholmiella obtusifolia (Brid.) Holmen & E.Warncke
