= Ulota barclayi =

Scientific classification
- Kingdom: Plantae
- Division: Bryophyta
- Class: Bryopsida
- Subclass: Bryidae
- Order: Orthotrichales
- Family: Orthotrichaceae
- Genus: Ulota
- Species: U. barclayi

Binomial name
- Ulota barclayi Mitt.

Synonyms
- Orthotrichum barclayi (Mitt.) Kindb.

Species of moss

Ulota barclayi is a species of moss in the family Orthotrichaceae. It is native to northwestern North America.
