= Orthotrichum truncato-dentatum =

Conservation status
- Endangered (IUCN 2.3)

Scientific classification
- Kingdom: Plantae
- Division: Bryophyta
- Class: Bryopsida
- Subclass: Bryidae
- Order: Orthotrichales
- Family: Orthotrichaceae
- Genus: Orthotrichum
- Species: O. truncato-dentatum

Binomial name
- Orthotrichum truncato-dentatum C. Muell.

Species of moss

Orthotrichum truncato-dentatum is a species of moss in the family Orthotrichaceae. It is native to Argentina and Uruguay. It was last collected over 100 years ago and its current status is unknown.
