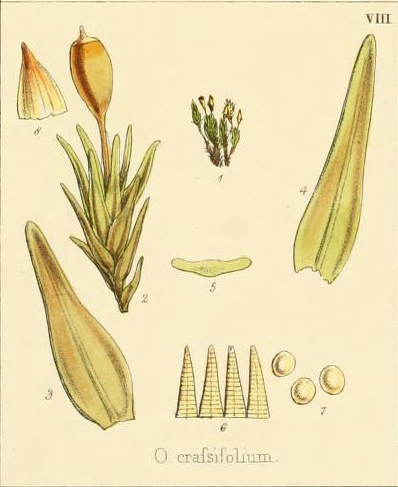

Scientific classification
- Kingdom: Plantae
- Division: Bryophyta
- Class: Bryopsida
- Subclass: Bryidae
- Order: Orthotrichales
- Family: Orthotrichaceae
- Genus: Orthotrichum
- Species: O. crassifolium

Binomial name
- Orthotrichum crassifolium Hook.f. & Wilson, London J. Bot. 3: 546 (1844)

Synonyms
- Muelleriella crassifolia P. Dusén, 1905

= Orthotrichum crassifolium =

Species of moss

Orthotrichum crassifolium is a species of moss in the family Orthotrichaceae. It is sometimes placed in the genus Muelleriella. It has a wide circumpolar distribution on subantarctic islands through the Southern Ocean, as well as the extreme south of South America and the northern end of the Antarctic Peninsula. It is tolerant of saline conditions and often occupies the supralittoral zone along rocky coastlines affected by sea spray.
