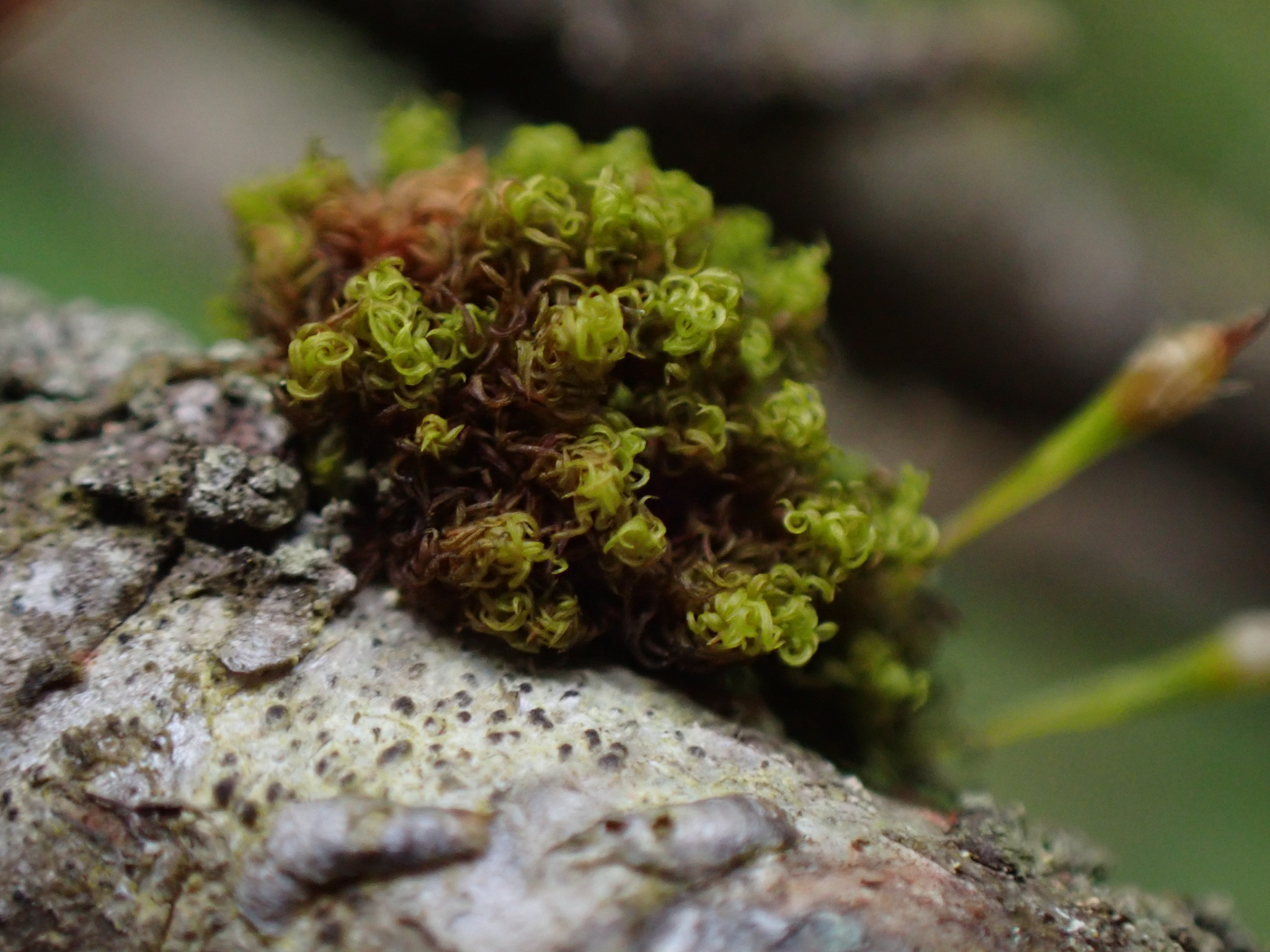

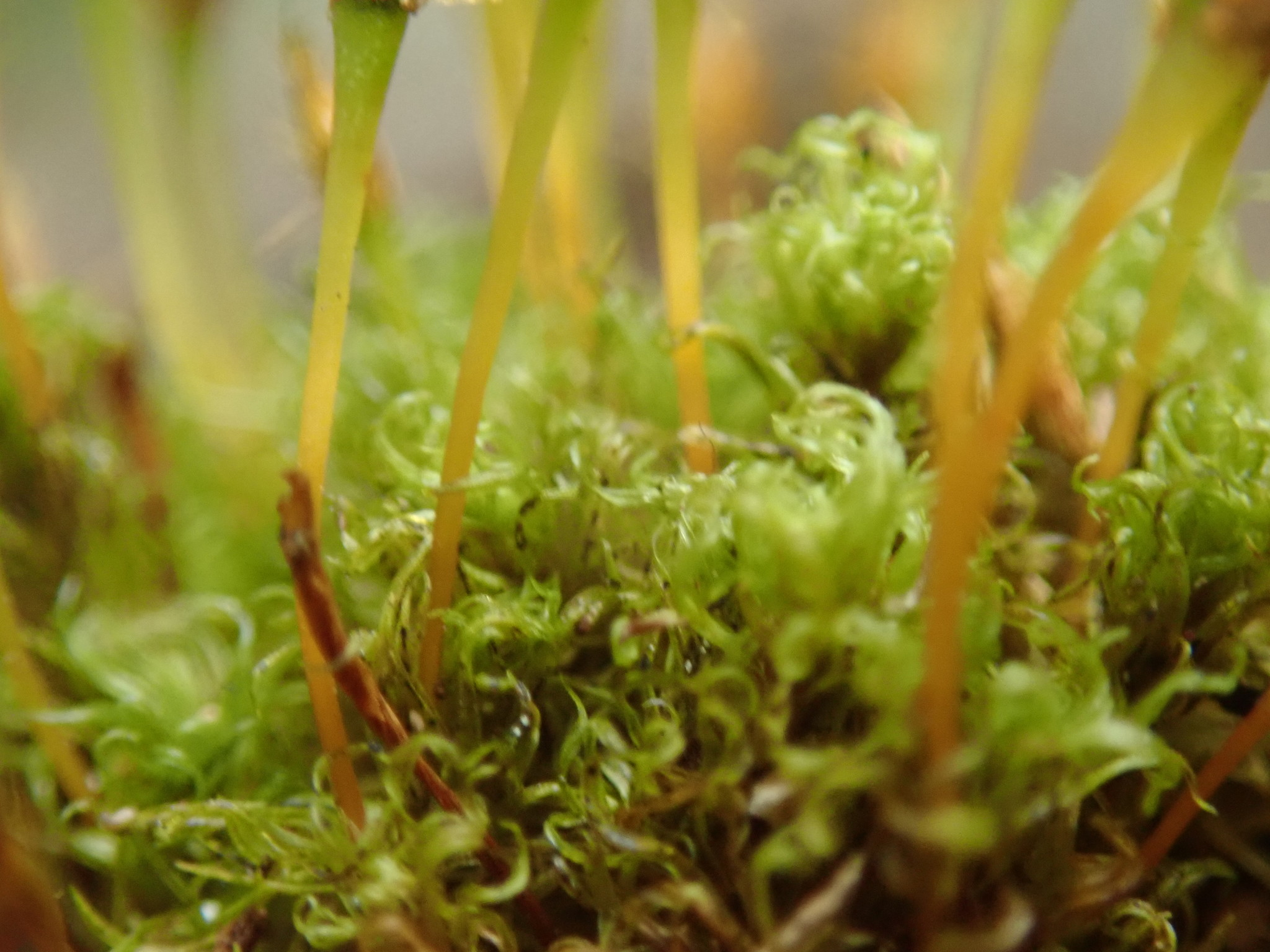

Scientific classification
- Kingdom: Plantae
- Division: Bryophyta
- Class: Bryopsida
- Subclass: Bryidae
- Order: Orthotrichales
- Family: Orthotrichaceae
- Genus: Ulota
- Species: U. obtusiuscula

Binomial name
- Ulota obtusiuscula Müll. Hal. & Kindb.

Synonyms
- Ulota alaskana Cardot & Thér.; Ulota crispa var. alaskana (Cardot & Thér.) Grout; Orthotrichum obtusiusculum (Müll.Hal. & Kindb.) Kindb.

= Ulota obtusiuscula =

Species of moss

Ulota obtusiuscula is a species of moss in the family Orthotrichaceae. It is native to western North America.
