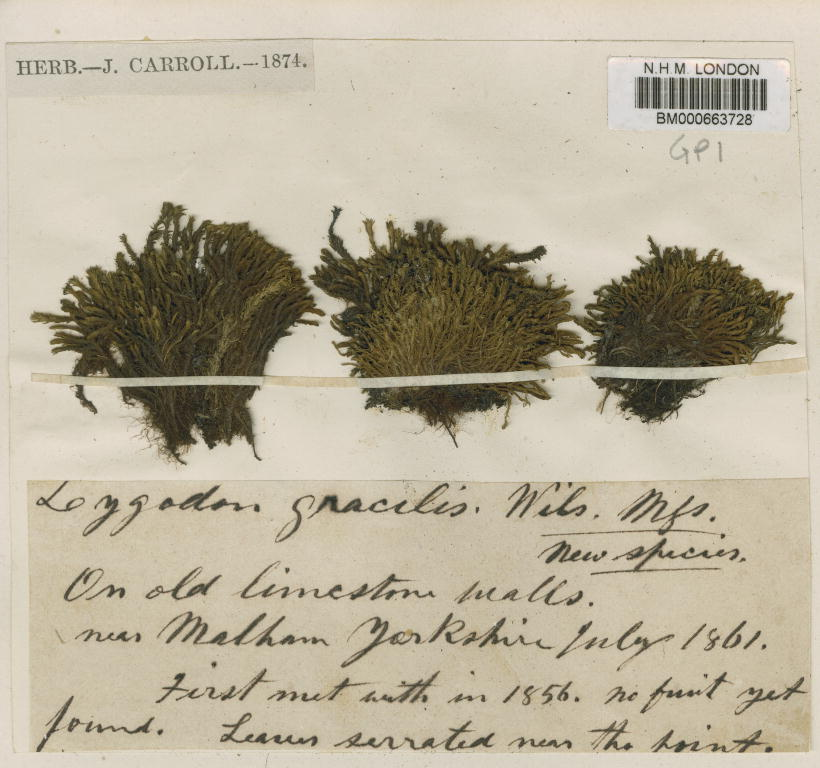
- Herbarium specimen the Natural History Museum in London

Scientific classification
- Kingdom: Plantae
- Division: Bryophyta
- Class: Bryopsida
- Subclass: Bryidae
- Order: Orthotrichales
- Family: Orthotrichaceae
- Genus: Zygodon
- Species: Z. gracilis

Binomial name
- Zygodon gracilis Wilson

= Zygodon gracilis =

Species of moss

Zygodon gracilis, the slender yokemoss, is a moss species in the family Orthotrichaceae. It is a rare lithophyte found to only grow on certain localities of limestone outcrops that has high calcium carbonate content. The current global conservation status of Z. gracilis is considered to be "imperiled".

== Morphology ==
Zygodon gracilis is a dioicous, acrocarpus moss that grows in turfs of around 5 cm tall. The squarrose, lanceolate leaves bends away from the stem when moist and becomes contorted when dry. The leaves have distinctive toothed margins near the apex that sets it apart from other Zygodon species. Newer leaves appear dull green that become reddish-brown lower down in the shoot. Sporophytes are very rare and have only been documented twice, both in England in 1866 and most recently in 2002. The species do not exhibit any specialized asexual reproductive structures in the wild.

== Distribution ==
=== Europe ===
The species is found in temperate regions of Europe, with scattered populations in the Alps, Carpathian Mountains, and England. In England, the remaining colonies of Zygodon gracilis is restricted to a hectad in Yorkshire Dales National Park.

=== North America ===
In North America, there is only a single population of Zygodon gracilis located in Haida Gwaii, British Columbia. Having been only observed in this one locality, this one population continues growing by clonal reproduction.

The disjunction in the Europe-North American distribution pattern is likely the result of the separation of the Laurasia landmass from 200 million years ago.

== Habitat ==
The species has only been found to grow on dry limestone, either pure limestone outcrops or stone walls made out of carboniferous limestone. Moreover, the rock surface must face north or northwest such that it can intercept mist and rainwater.

== Conservation status ==
Zygodon gracilis has been given a global conservation rank of "imperiled" (G2). This indicates that the numerous physiological and environmental requirements puts the population at high risk of becoming extinct.

Since it was first discovered in England, the average winter temperatures has increased by 0.5 °C. Over time, the populations at lower elevation has gone extinct with only populations at higher elevations remaining. The male and female colonies present in England are also observed to be very spatially segregated, resulting in the rarity of sexual reproductive structure. The combination of a narrow habitat range and a lack of dispersal methods make current populations very sensitive to the effects of climate change.

In Canada, the species is classified by the COSEWIC as endangered. The most immediate threat to the single colony in Haida Gwaii are the spreading vegetation nearby that is changing the local microclimate. The expansion of nearby tree canopy increases shading and humidity of the cliff face, which leads to an overgrowth of lichen and cyanobacteria amongst the population.
