= Bayas (river) =

River in northern Spain

Coordinates: 42.6753°N 2.9292°W

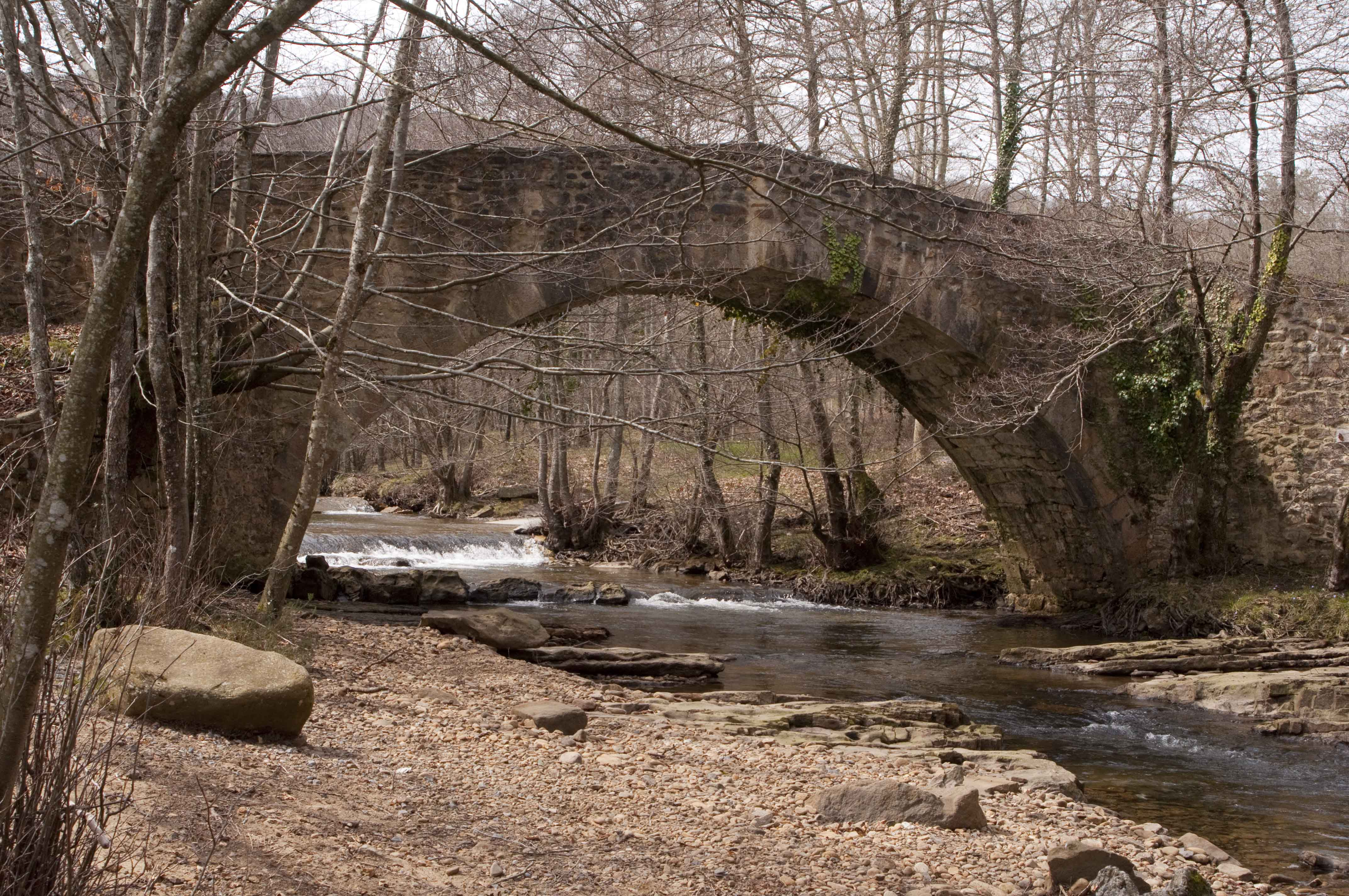
- The Arlobi bridge over the river, in the Gorbeia Natural Park

Location
- Country: Spain

Physical characteristics
- Source
  - location: Ubegi spring, Gorbeia massif
- Mouth
  - location: Ebro River
- Length: 56 km (35 mi)
- Basin size: 300 km^{2} (120 sq mi)

Basin features
- Progression: Ebro→ Balearic Sea

Natura 2000 site (SAC)
- Official name: Baia ibaia / Río Baia
- Designated: March 2015
- Reference no.: ES2110006
- Area: 4.48 km^{2} (1.73 sq mi)

The Bayas (Spanish pronunciation: [ˈbaʝas]) or Baia (Basque pronunciation: [bai.a]) is a river of Spain. From its source in the Gorbeia massif in Biscay, it flows southwards through Álava before discharging into the Ebro River near Miranda de Ebro, Burgos.

== See also ==
- Orthotrichum casasianum – an endemic species of moss growing in trees on the banks of the river
