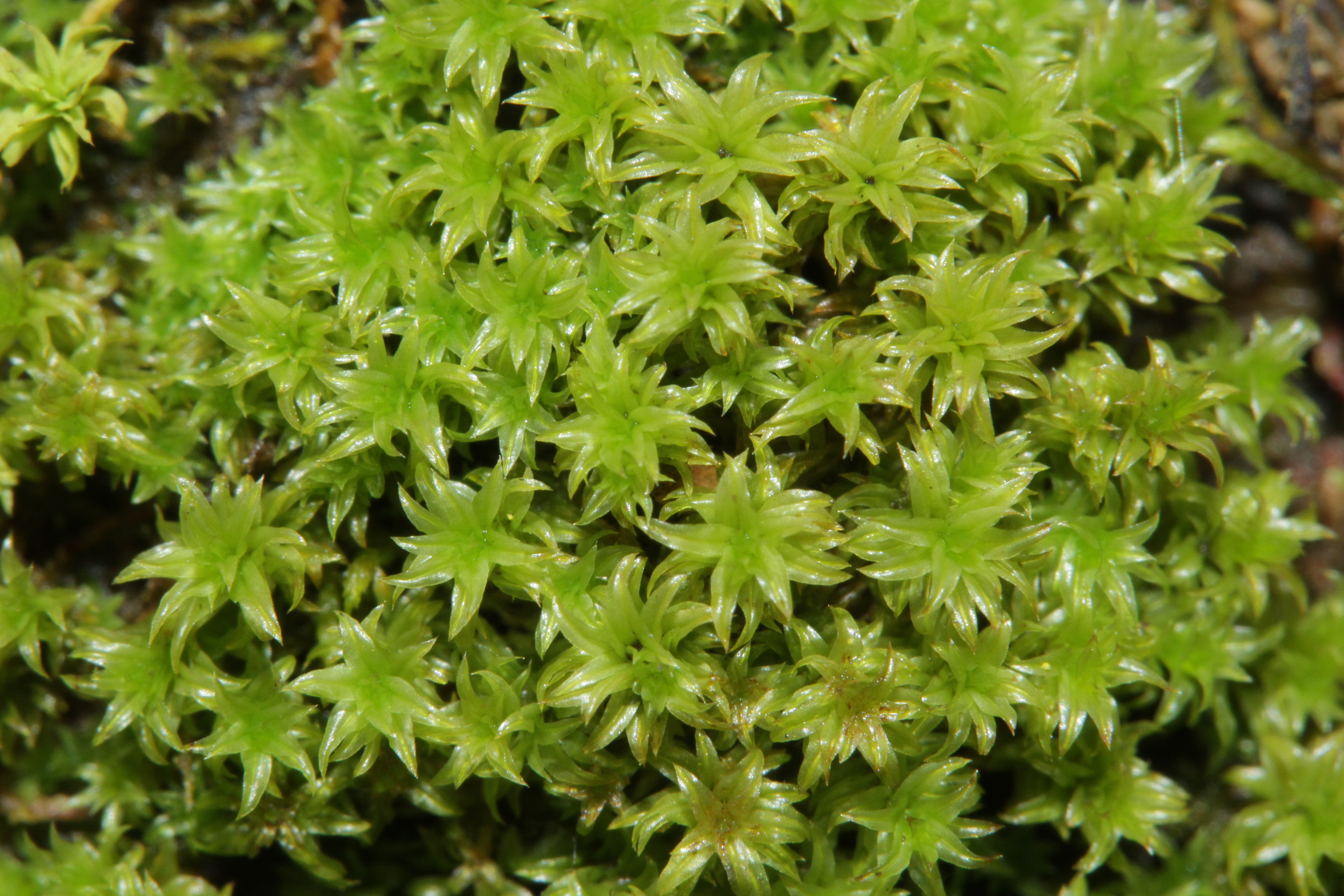

Scientific classification
- Kingdom: Plantae
- Division: Bryophyta
- Class: Bryopsida
- Subclass: Bryidae
- Order: Orthotrichales
- Family: Orthotrichaceae
- Genus: Zygodon
- Species: Z. viridissimus

Binomial name
- Zygodon viridissimus Bridel, 1826

= Zygodon viridissimus =

Species of moss

Zygodon viridissimus, the green yokemoss, is a species of moss belonging to the family Orthotrichaceae.

It has almost cosmopolitan distribution.
