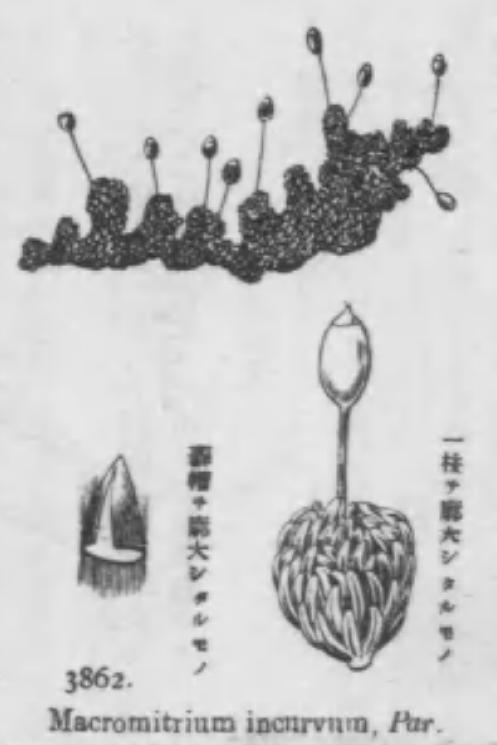
- Macromitrium japonicum

Scientific classification
- Kingdom: Plantae
- Clade: Embryophytes
- Division: Bryophyta
- Class: Bryopsida
- Subclass: Bryidae
- Order: Orthotrichales
- Family: Orthotrichaceae
- Genus: Macromitrium; Brid.

Synonyms
- Dasymitrium Lindb.; Leiostoma (Mitt.) Mitt.; Teichodontium Müll.Hal.

= Macromitrium =

Genus of mosses

Macromitrium is a genus of mosses belonging to the family Orthotrichaceae.

The species of this genus are found predominantly in the Southern Hemisphere.

== Species ==
The following species are recognised in the genus Macromitrium:

- Macromitrium acuminatum (Reinw. & Hornsch.) Müll.Hal.
- Macromitrium acutirameum Mitt.
- Macromitrium acutissimum Müll.Hal.
- Macromitrium altum Müll.Hal.
- Macromitrium amaniense P.de la Varde
- Macromitrium amboroicum Herzog
- Macromitrium angulatum Mitt.
- Macromitrium angulosum Thwaites & Mitt.
- Macromitrium angustifolium Dozy & Molk.
- Macromitrium antarcticum C.H.Wright
- Macromitrium archboldii E.B.Bartram
- Macromitrium archeri Mitt.
- Macromitrium argutum Hampe
- Macromitrium atratum Herzog
- Macromitrium atroviride R.S.Williams
- Macromitrium attenuatum Hampe
- Macromitrium aurantiacum Paris & Broth.
- Macromitrium aurescens Hampe
- Macromitrium aureum Müll.Hal.
- Macromitrium austrocirrosum E.B.Bartram
- Macromitrium bifasciculare Müll.Hal. ex Dusén
- Macromitrium bifasciculatum Müll.Hal.
- Macromitrium binsteadii Dixon
- Macromitrium bistratosum E.B.Bartram
- Macromitrium blumei Nees ex Schwägr.
- Macromitrium brachycarpum Mitt.
- Macromitrium brachypodium Müll.Hal.
- Macromitrium braunii Müll.Hal.
- Macromitrium brevicaule (Besch.) Broth.
- Macromitrium brevihamatum Herzog
- Macromitrium brevisetum Mitt.
- Macromitrium brevissimum Dixon
- Macromitrium bujongolanum O'Shea
- Macromitrium caldense Ångstr.
- Macromitrium caloblastoides Müll.Hal.
- Macromitrium calocalyx Müll.Hal.
- Macromitrium calomicron Broth.
- Macromitrium calymperoideum Mitt.
- Macromitrium campoanum Thér.
- Macromitrium cardotii Thér.
- Macromitrium carionis C.Müller, 1897
- Macromitrium cataractarum Müll.Hal.
- Macromitrium catharinense Paris
- Macromitrium cavaleriei Cardot & Thér.
- Macromitrium chloromitrium (Besch.) Wilbraham
- Macromitrium cirrosum (Hedw.) Brid.
- Macromitrium clastophyllum Cardot
- Macromitrium clavatum Schimp. ex Grout
- Macromitrium clemensiae E.B.Bartram
- Macromitrium comatum Mitt.
- Macromitrium complicatulum Müll.Hal.
- Macromitrium concinnum Mitt. ex Bosch & Sande Lac.
- Macromitrium constrictum Hampe & Lorentz
- Macromitrium crassirameum Müll.Hal.
- Macromitrium crassiusculum Lorentz
- Macromitrium crenulatum Hampe
- Macromitrium crinale Broth. & Geh.
- Macromitrium crispatulum Mitt.
- Macromitrium crosbyorum B.H.Allen & Vitt
- Macromitrium cucullatulum Müll.Hal.
- Macromitrium cuspidatum Hampe
- Macromitrium cylindricum Mitt.
- Macromitrium densum Mitt.
- Macromitrium diaphanum Müll.Hal.
- Macromitrium dickasonii E.B.Bartram
- Macromitrium dielsii Broth. ex Vitt & H.P.Ramsay
- Macromitrium divaricatum Mitt.
- Macromitrium diversifolium Broth.
- Macromitrium dubium Schimp. ex Müll.Hal.
- Macromitrium dusenii Müll.Hal. ex Broth.
- Macromitrium echinatum B.H.Allen
- Macromitrium ecrispatum Dixon
- Macromitrium eddyi B.C.Tan & Shevock
- Macromitrium ellipticum Hampe
- Macromitrium emersulum Müll.Hal.
- Macromitrium eriomitrium Müll.Hal.
- Macromitrium erubescens E.B.Bartram
- Macromitrium erythrocomum H.P.Ramsay, A.Cairns & Meagher
- Macromitrium evrardii Thér.
- Macromitrium exsertum Broth.
- Macromitrium falcatulum Müll.Hal.
- Macromitrium fendleri Müll.Hal.
- Macromitrium fernandezianum Broth.
- Macromitrium ferriei Cardot & Thér.
- Macromitrium fimbriatum (P.Beauv.) Schwägr.
- Macromitrium fitzgeraldii Lesq. & James
- Macromitrium flavopilosum R.S.Williams
- Macromitrium flexuosum Mitt.
- Macromitrium formosae Cardot
- Macromitrium fortunatii Cardot & Thér.
- Macromitrium fragile Hampe
- Macromitrium fragilicuspis Cardot
- Macromitrium francii Thér.
- Macromitrium frondosum Mitt.
- Macromitrium frustratum B.H.Allen
- Macromitrium fulgescens E.B.Bartram
- Macromitrium fulvum Mitt.
- Macromitrium funicaule Schimp. ex Besch.
- Macromitrium funiforme Dixon
- Macromitrium fuscescens Schwägr.
- Macromitrium fuscoaureum E.B.Bartram
- Macromitrium galipense Müll.Hal.
- Macromitrium gigasporum Herzog
- Macromitrium glabratum Broth.
- Macromitrium globirameum Müll.Hal.
- Macromitrium gracile (Hook.) Schwägr.
- Macromitrium greenmanii Grout
- Macromitrium grossirete Müll.Hal.
- Macromitrium guatemalense Müll.Hal.
- Macromitrium gymnostomum Sull. & Lesq.
- Macromitrium hainanense S.L.Guo & S.He
- Macromitrium hariotii Besch. ex Müll.Hal.
- Macromitrium harrisii Paris
- Macromitrium hartmanni Müll.Hal.
- Macromitrium helmsii Paris
- Macromitrium hemitrichodes Schwägr.
- Macromitrium herzogii Broth.
- Macromitrium heterodictyon Dixon
- Macromitrium hildebrandtii Müll.Hal.
- Macromitrium himalayanum Dixon
- Macromitrium holomitrioides Nog.
- Macromitrium hornschuchii Müll.Hal.
- Macromitrium hortoniae Vitt & H.P.Ramsay
- Macromitrium huigrense R.S.Williams
- Macromitrium humboldtense Thouvenot & Frank Müll.
- Macromitrium hymenostomum Mont.
- Macromitrium incurvifolium (Hook. & Grev.) Schwägr.
- Macromitrium involutifolium (Hook. & Grev.) Schwägr.
- Macromitrium japonicum Dozy & Molk.
- Macromitrium kinabaluense J.Froehl.
- Macromitrium krausei Lorentz
- Macromitrium laevigatum Thér.
- Macromitrium lanceolatum Broth.
- Macromitrium laosianum Paris & Broth.
- Macromitrium larrainii Thouvenot & K.T.Yong
- Macromitrium lauterbachii Broth. ex M.Fleisch.
- Macromitrium lebomboense van Rooy
- Macromitrium leprieurii Mont.
- Macromitrium leratii Broth. & Paris
- Macromitrium ligulaefolium Broth.
- Macromitrium ligulare Mitt.
- Macromitrium ligulifolium Broth.
- Macromitrium liliputanum Müll.Hal.
- Macromitrium lomasense H.Rob.
- Macromitrium lonchomitrioides Müll.Hal.
- Macromitrium longicaule Müll.Hal.
- Macromitrium longifolium (Hook.) Brid.
- Macromitrium longipapillosum D.D.Li, J.Yu, T.Cao & S.L.Guo
- Macromitrium longipes (Hook.) Schwägr.
- Macromitrium longipilum A.Braun ex Müll.Hal.
- Macromitrium longirostre (Hook.) Schwägr.
- Macromitrium lorifolium Paris & Broth.
- Macromitrium macrocomoides Müll.Hal.
- Macromitrium macrosporum Broth.
- Macromitrium macrothele Müll.Hal.
- Macromitrium maolanense Ze Y.Zhang, D.D.Li, J.Yu & S.L.Guo
- Macromitrium marginatum Dixon
- Macromitrium masafuerae Broth.
- Macromitrium mcphersonii B.H.Allen
- Macromitrium megalocladon M.Fleisch.
- Macromitrium melinii Roiv.
- Macromitrium menziesii Müll.Hal.
- Macromitrium microblastum Broth.
- Macromitrium microcarpum Müll.Hal.
- Macromitrium microstomum (Hook. & Grev.) Schwägr.
- Macromitrium minutum Mitt.
- Macromitrium mittenianum Steere
- Macromitrium moorcroftii (Hook. & Grev.) Schwägr.
- Macromitrium mosenii Broth.
- Macromitrium muellerianum Mitt.
- Macromitrium nanothecium Müll.Hal. ex Cardot
- Macromitrium nepalense (Hook. & Grev.) Schwägr.
- Macromitrium nietneri Müll.Hal.
- Macromitrium nigricans Mitt.
- Macromitrium noguchianum W.Schultze-Motel
- Macromitrium norrisianum Vitt
- Macromitrium novorecurvulum B.C.Tan & B.C.Ho
- Macromitrium nubigenum Herzog
- Macromitrium oblongum (Taylor) Mitt.
- Macromitrium ochraceum (Dozy & Molk.) Müll.Hal.
- Macromitrium okabei Sakurai
- Macromitrium onraedtii Bizot
- Macromitrium onraedtii Bizot ex Onr.
- Macromitrium orthophyllum Mitt.
- Macromitrium orthostichum Nees ex Schwägr.
- Macromitrium ousiense Broth. & Paris
- Macromitrium ovale Mitt.
- Macromitrium pallidum (P.Beauv.) Wijk & Margad.
- Macromitrium panduraefolium Thouvenot
- Macromitrium papillisetum Dixon
- Macromitrium paraphysatum Sehnem
- Macromitrium paridis Besch.
- Macromitrium parvifolium Dixon
- Macromitrium parvirete E.B.Bartram
- Macromitrium patens Wilson
- Macromitrium peraristatum Broth.
- Macromitrium perdensifolium Dixon
- Macromitrium perichaetiale (Hook. & Grev.) Müll.Hal.
- Macromitrium perpusillum Müll.Hal.
- Macromitrium perreflexum Steere
- Macromitrium pertriste Müll.Hal.
- Macromitrium petelotii Tixier
- Macromitrium phyllorhizans Besch.
- Macromitrium picobonitum B.H.Allen
- Macromitrium pilicalyx Dixon ex E.B.Bartram
- Macromitrium piliferum Schwägr.
- Macromitrium pilosum Thér.
- Macromitrium pinnulatum Herzog
- Macromitrium polygonostomum Dixon & P.de la Varde
- Macromitrium profusum Müll.Hal.
- Macromitrium prolongatum Mitt.
- Macromitrium prorepens (Hook.) Schwägr.
- Macromitrium proximum Thér.
- Macromitrium pseudofimbriatum Hampe
- Macromitrium pseudoramentosum Herzog
- Macromitrium pseudoserrulatum E.B.Bartram
- Macromitrium pulchrum Besch.
- Macromitrium pullenii Vitt
- Macromitrium punctatum (Hook. & Grev.) Brid.
- Macromitrium pyriforme Müll.Hal.
- Macromitrium raphidophyllum Müll.Hal.
- Macromitrium refractifolium Müll.Hal.
- Macromitrium regnellii Hampe
- Macromitrium renauldii Thér.
- Macromitrium repandum Müll.Hal.
- Macromitrium retusulum Müll.Hal.
- Macromitrium retusum Hook.f. & Wilson
- Macromitrium rhacomitrioides Nog.
- Macromitrium rhizomatosum Müll.Hal.
- Macromitrium rimbachii Herzog
- Macromitrium rufipilum Cardot
- Macromitrium ruginosum Besch.
- Macromitrium rugulosum Ångstr.
- Macromitrium rusbyanum E.Britton
- Macromitrium saddleanum Besch. ex Müll.Hal.
- Macromitrium salakanum Müll.Hal.
- Macromitrium savatieri Besch.
- Macromitrium schmidii Müll.Hal.
- Macromitrium sclerodictyon Cardot
- Macromitrium scoparium Mitt.
- Macromitrium sejunctum B.H.Allen
- Macromitrium semperi Müll.Hal.
- Macromitrium serpens (Burch. ex Hook. & Grev.) Brid.
- Macromitrium sharpii H.A.Crum ex Vitt
- Macromitrium similirete E.B.Bartram
- Macromitrium solitarium Müll.Hal.
- Macromitrium soulae Renauld & Cardot
- Macromitrium spec E.B.Bartram
- Macromitrium speirostichum Müll.Hal.
- Macromitrium squarrosum Müll.Hal.
- Macromitrium standleyi E.B.Bartram
- Macromitrium stephanodictyon J.Froehl.
- Macromitrium stoneae Vitt & H.P.Ramsay
- Macromitrium streimannii Vitt
- Macromitrium striatum Mitt. ex Bosch & Sande Lac.
- Macromitrium strictfolium Müll.Hal.
- Macromitrium stricticuspis Müll.Hal.
- Macromitrium subbrevihamatum Broth.
- Macromitrium subcirrhosum Müll.Hal.
- Macromitrium subcrenulatum Broth.
- Macromitrium subdiaphanum Renauld & Cardot
- Macromitrium subdiscretum R.S.Williams
- Macromitrium subhemitrichodes Müll.Hal.
- Macromitrium subincurvum Cardot & Thér.
- Macromitrium sublaeve Mitt.
- Macromitrium sublongicaule E.B.Bartram
- Macromitrium subpaucidens Müll.Hal.
- Macromitrium subperichaetiale Thér.
- Macromitrium subscabrum Mitt.
- Macromitrium subtortum (Hook. & Grev.) Schwägr.
- Macromitrium subulatum Mitt.
- Macromitrium sulcatum (Hook.) Brid.
- Macromitrium swainsonii (Hook.) Brid.
- Macromitrium tahitisecundum Margad.
- Macromitrium taiheizanense Nog.
- Macromitrium taiwanense Nog.
- Macromitrium taoense Thér.
- Macromitrium tenax Müll.Hal.
- Macromitrium thwaitesii Broth. ex M.Fleisch.
- Macromitrium tocaremae Hampe
- Macromitrium tongense Sull.
- Macromitrium torulosum Mitt.
- Macromitrium tosae Besch.
- Macromitrium trachypodium Mitt.
- Macromitrium trichophyllum Mitt.
- Macromitrium trinitense R.S.Williams
- Macromitrium tuberculatum Dixon
- Macromitrium turgidum Dixon
- Macromitrium tylostomum Mitt. ex Bosch & Sande Lac.
- Macromitrium ulophyllum Mitt.
- Macromitrium undatum Müll.Hal.
- Macromitrium uraiense Nog.
- Macromitrium urceolatulum Müll.Hal.
- Macromitrium urceolatum (Hook.) Brid.
- Macromitrium validum Herzog
- Macromitrium venezuelense Paris
- Macromitrium vesiculosum Tixier
- Macromitrium vitianum E.B.Bartram
- Macromitrium viticulosum (Raddi) Brid.
- Macromitrium weissioides Müll.Hal.
- Macromitrium xenizon B.H.Allen & W.R.Buck
- Macromitrium yuleanum Broth. & Geh.
- Macromitrium zimmermannii M.Fleisch.
