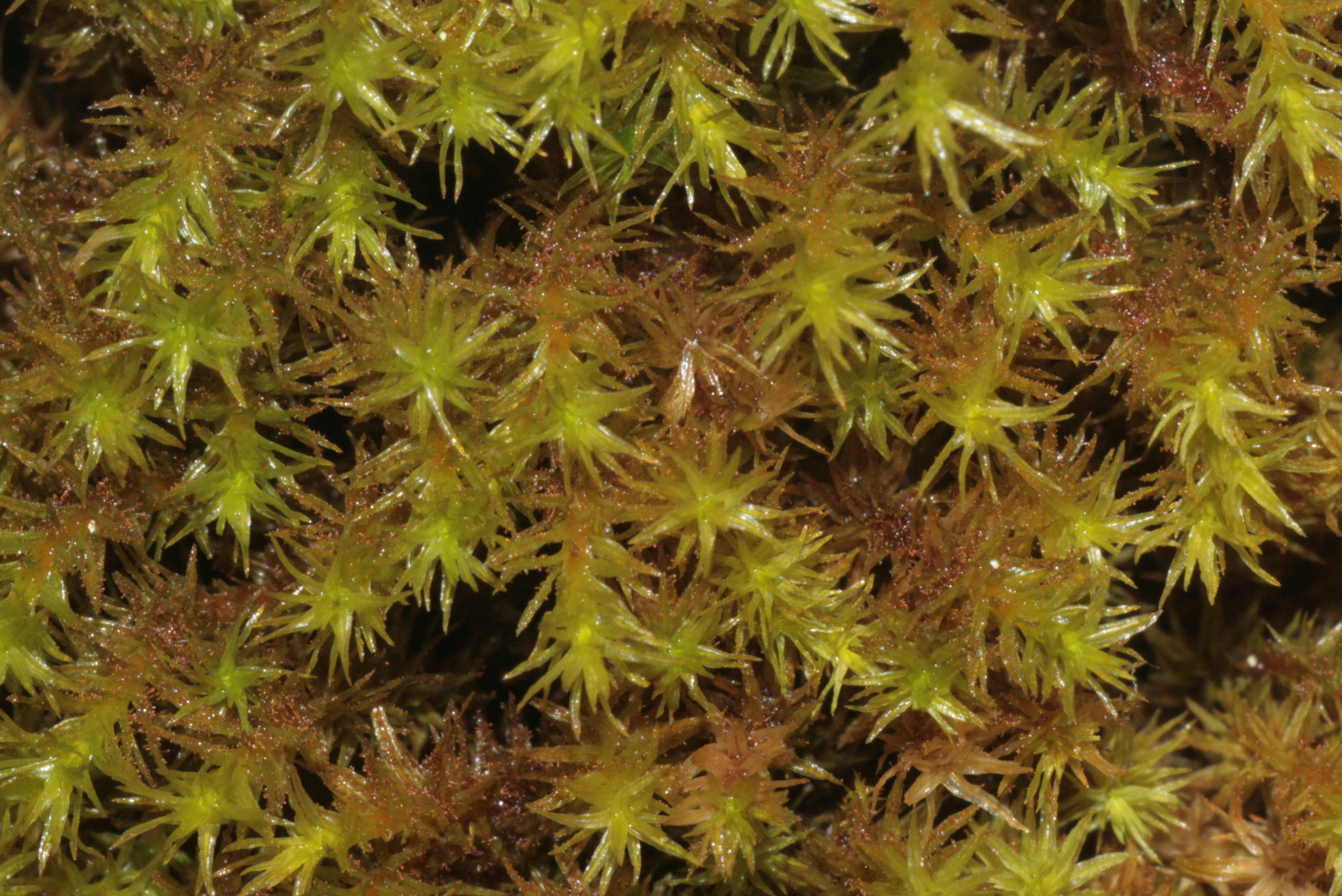

Scientific classification
- Kingdom: Plantae
- Division: Bryophyta
- Class: Bryopsida
- Subclass: Bryidae
- Order: Orthotrichales
- Family: Orthotrichaceae
- Genus: Orthotrichum
- Species: O. lyellii

Binomial name
- Orthotrichum lyellii W.J.Hooker & T.Taylor

Synonyms
- Pulvigera lyellii (Hook. & Taylor) Plášek, Sawicki & Ochyra

= Orthotrichum lyellii =

Species of moss

Orthotrichum lyellii, also known as Lyell's bristle moss, is a species of acrocarpous moss belonging to the family Orthotrichaceae. O. lyellii can be found throughout western North America and Europe. It is found most commonly growing epiphytically on a variety of trees, and less commonly on rocks or boulder substrates.

== Description ==
Orthotrichum lyellii is generally described as forming green and yellow mats, with loose tufts reaching lengths of 3 to 4 cm forming mound-like structures. Its leaves are sharply pointed with a single costa and lanceolate linear leaf morphology, being very slender and reaching lengths of 2.5 to 6.5 mm. Tufts can reach lengths ranging from 10 to 13 cm, and often are found lying prostrate to the ground. The lamina cells of its leaves are papillose, and the entire leaf surface can often be found dusted with brown asexual propagules (gemmae) which may help to distinguish it from similar species such as Orthotrichum papillosum. Pale-brown or brown rhizoids may be found located at the base of the plant, with amount of branching varying but usually minimal.

== Habitat and distribution ==
Distribution of Orthotrichum lyellii in North America is primarily restricted to west of the Rocky Mountains, extending from Southeastern Alaska to California. It can also be found distributed throughout Europe, descending from the United Kingdom to the Mediterranean area of North Africa and Western Asia. O. lyellii distribution is concentrated in coastal temperate rainforests lying closer to sea level.

O. lyellii grows epiphytically on the surfaces of tree trunks and branches; they are more frequently found growing on deciduous trees such as maple, alder and oak, and less commonly on coniferous trees such as spruce and hemlock. They can also be found on the rocks or boulders located beneath said trees, although the frequency of this is low.

== Reproduction ==
Unique to O. lyellii within its genus is its dioicous sexual condition, meaning it bears its archegonia and antheridia on different plants. The male plants can often be identified by their smaller size and are often found as tufts located near female plants. Another distinctive feature of the male plants is the conspicuous bulb-like branches that harbour its reproductive gametophores.

The sporophytic stage is characterized by rare, slightly exserted capsules that are often immersed in the perichaetial leaves. The sporangia is distinct with 8 ribs that may run either one half or the entire length of the sporangia. Like most mosses belonging to the Bryopsida class, O. lyellii has white arthrodontous peristome teeth, with 16 teeth being located in both the exostome and endostome. Similar to many mosses of the Orthotrichum genus, the calyptra is hairy with straight hairs running its length, often pointed towards its tip.
