= Orthotrichum scanicum =

Conservation status
- Least Concern (IUCN 3.1)

Scientific classification
- Kingdom: Plantae
- Division: Bryophyta
- Class: Bryopsida
- Subclass: Bryidae
- Order: Orthotrichales
- Family: Orthotrichaceae
- Genus: Orthotrichum
- Species: O. scanicum

Binomial name
- Orthotrichum scanicum Grönvall

Species of moss

Orthotrichum scanicum is a species of moss in the Orthotrichaceae family. It is found in Austria, the Czech Republic, China, Denmark, France, Germany, Greece, Hungary, Italy, Norway, Poland, Russia, Serbia and Montenegro, Sweden, and Switzerland. Its natural habitat is temperate forests. It is threatened by habitat loss.

O. scanicum was first found in China in 2010 by a researcher named M. Sulayman. He found this moss on Anshan Mountain which is part of an autonomous region of China. Between the years 2010 and 2015, the species was recorded in 11 additional locations in or near this region.
