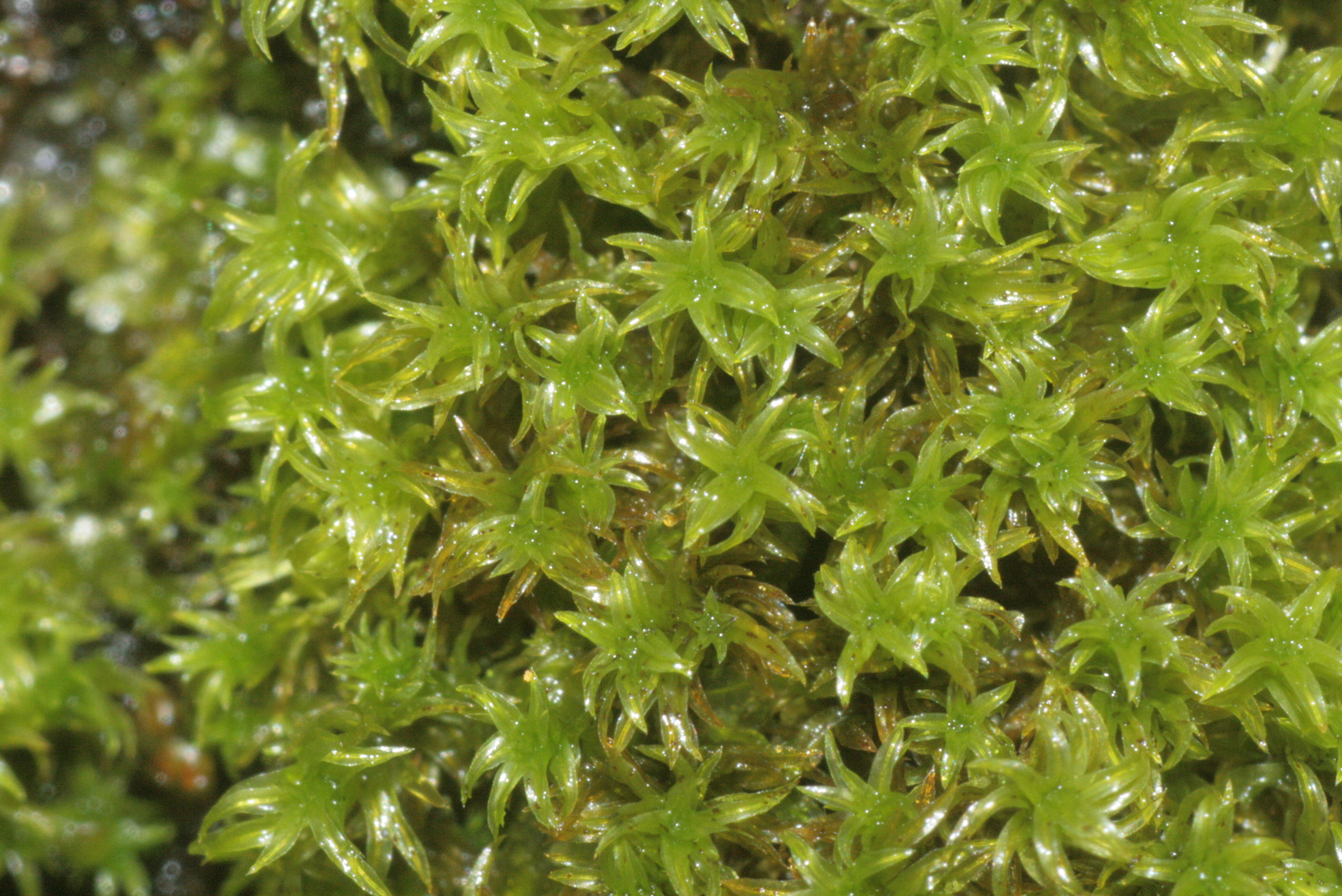
- Zygodon dentatus

Scientific classification
- Kingdom: Plantae
- Division: Bryophyta
- Class: Bryopsida
- Subclass: Bryidae
- Order: Orthotrichales
- Family: Orthotrichaceae
- Genus: Zygodon; Hook. & Taylor

= Zygodon =

Genus of mosses

Zygodon is a genus of moss in family Orthotrichaceae.

== Species ==
- Zygodon gracilis Wilson — slender yokemoss
- Zygodon viridissimus Bridel, 1826 — green yokemoss
