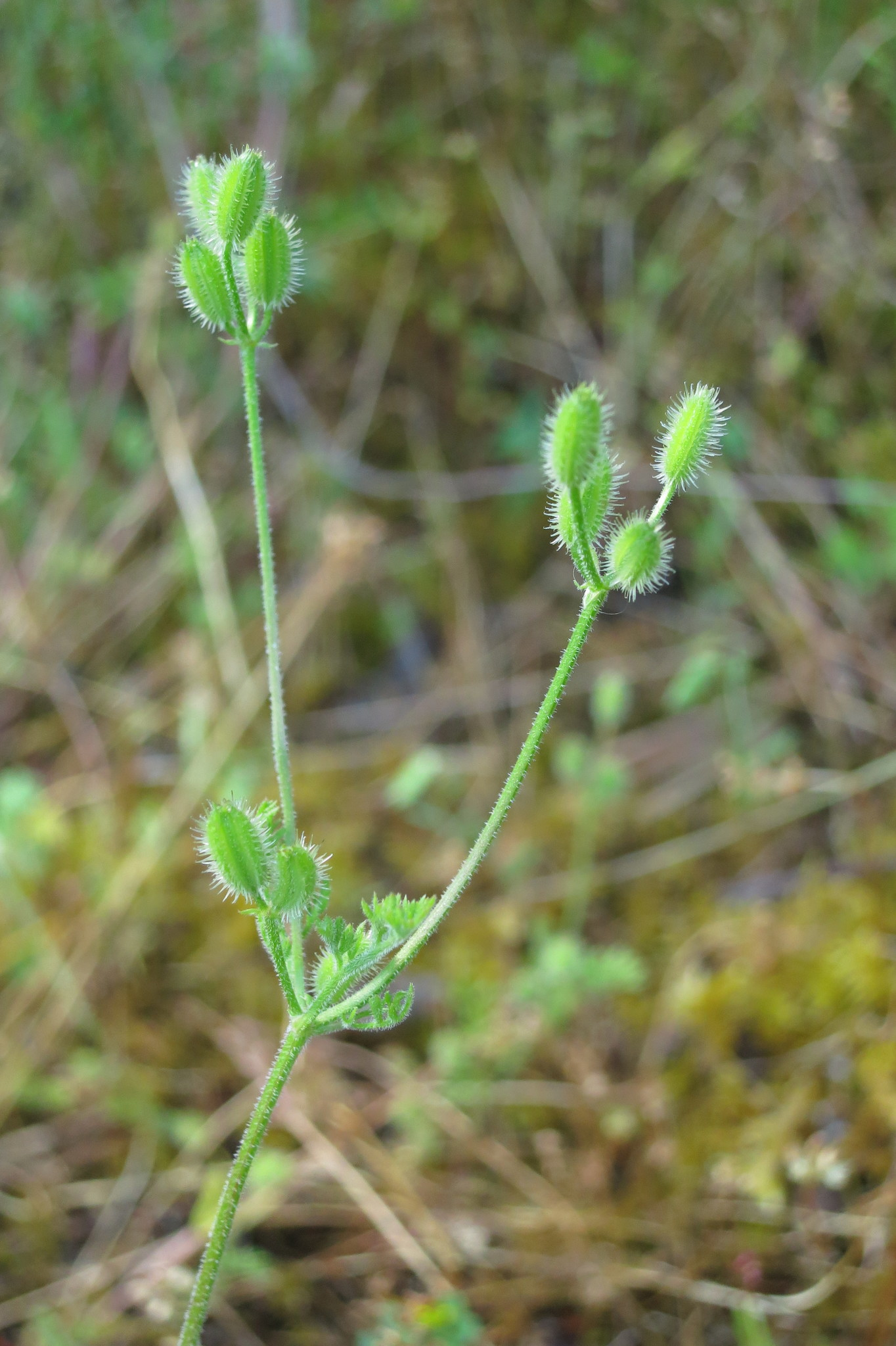
- Yabea microcarpa in British Columbia

Scientific classification
- Kingdom: Plantae
- Clade: Embryophytes
- Clade: Tracheophytes
- Clade: Angiosperms
- Clade: Eudicots
- Clade: Asterids
- Order: Apiales
- Family: Apiaceae
- Subfamily: Apioideae
- Tribe: Scandiceae
- Subtribe: Torilidinae
- Genus: Yabea; Koso-Pol.
- Species: Y. microcarpa

Binomial name
- Yabea microcarpa (Hook. & Arn.) Koso-Pol.

Synonyms
- Caucalis microcarpa Hook. & Arn.

= Yabea =

Genus of flowering plants

The monotypic genus Yabea contains the single species Yabea microcarpa, which is known by the common names California hedge parsley and false carrot. It is similar in appearance to other species of wild carrot and relatives. It is native to western North America, including the western United States, British Columbia and Baja California. It grows in many types of habitat.

In Baja California, this species is mostly found in the northwestern part of the state, but it does range into the Central Desert. It is also found on Guadalupe Island in the Pacific Ocean.
