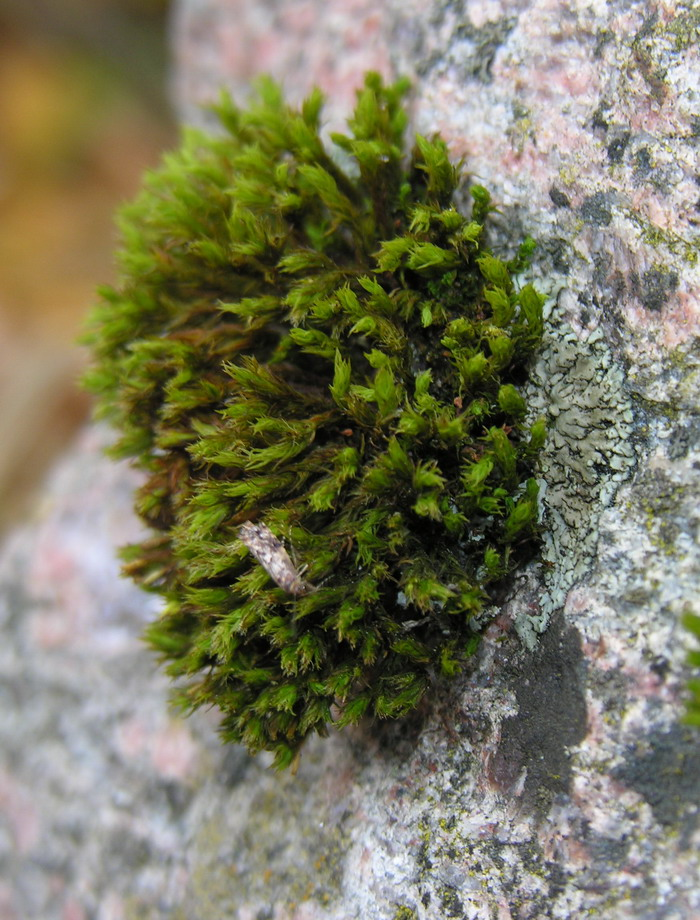
- An Orthotrichum moss

Scientific classification
- Kingdom: Plantae
- Division: Bryophyta
- Class: Bryopsida
- Subclass: Bryidae
- Order: Orthotrichales
- Family: Orthotrichaceae
- Genus: Orthotrichum; Hedw.

= Orthotrichum =

Genus of mosses

Orthotrichum is a genus of moss in the family Orthotrichaceae. It is distributed throughout the world.

There are about 125 species in the genus.

Species include:

- Orthotrichum affine
- Orthotrichum alpestre
- Orthotrichum anomalum
- Orthotrichum bartramii – Bartram's orthotrichum moss
- Orthotrichum bolanderi – Bolander's orthotrichum moss
- Orthotrichum casasianum
- Orthotrichum consimile
- Orthotrichum crassifolium Hook.f. & Wilson
- Orthotrichum cupulatum
- Orthotrichum diaphanum
- Orthotrichum epapillosum
- Orthotrichum exiguum
- Orthotrichum fenestratum
- Orthotrichum flowersii
- Orthotrichum gymnostomum
- Orthotrichum hallii – Hall's orthotrichum moss
- Orthotrichum holzingeri – Holzinger's orthotrichum moss
- Orthotrichum keeverae – Keever's orthotrichum moss
- Orthotrichum laevigatum
- Orthotrichum lyellii
- Orthotrichum obtusifolium – obtuseleaf aspen moss
- Orthotrichum ohioense – Ohio orthotrichum moss
- Orthotrichum pallens
- Orthotrichum pellucidum – xerophytic limestone moss
- Orthotrichum praemorsum
- Orthotrichum pulchellum
- Orthotrichum pumilum
- Orthotrichum pusillum
- Orthotrichum pylaisii – Pylais' orthotrichum moss
- Orthotrichum rivulare – streamside orthotrichum moss
- Orthotrichum rupestre
- Orthotrichum scanicum Grönvall
- Orthotrichum sordidum
- Orthotrichum speciosum – lanceolateleaf rock moss
- Orthotrichum stellatum – stellate orthotrichum moss
- Orthotrichum strangulatum – strangulate orthotrichum moss
- Orthotrichum truncato-dentatum C. Muell.
