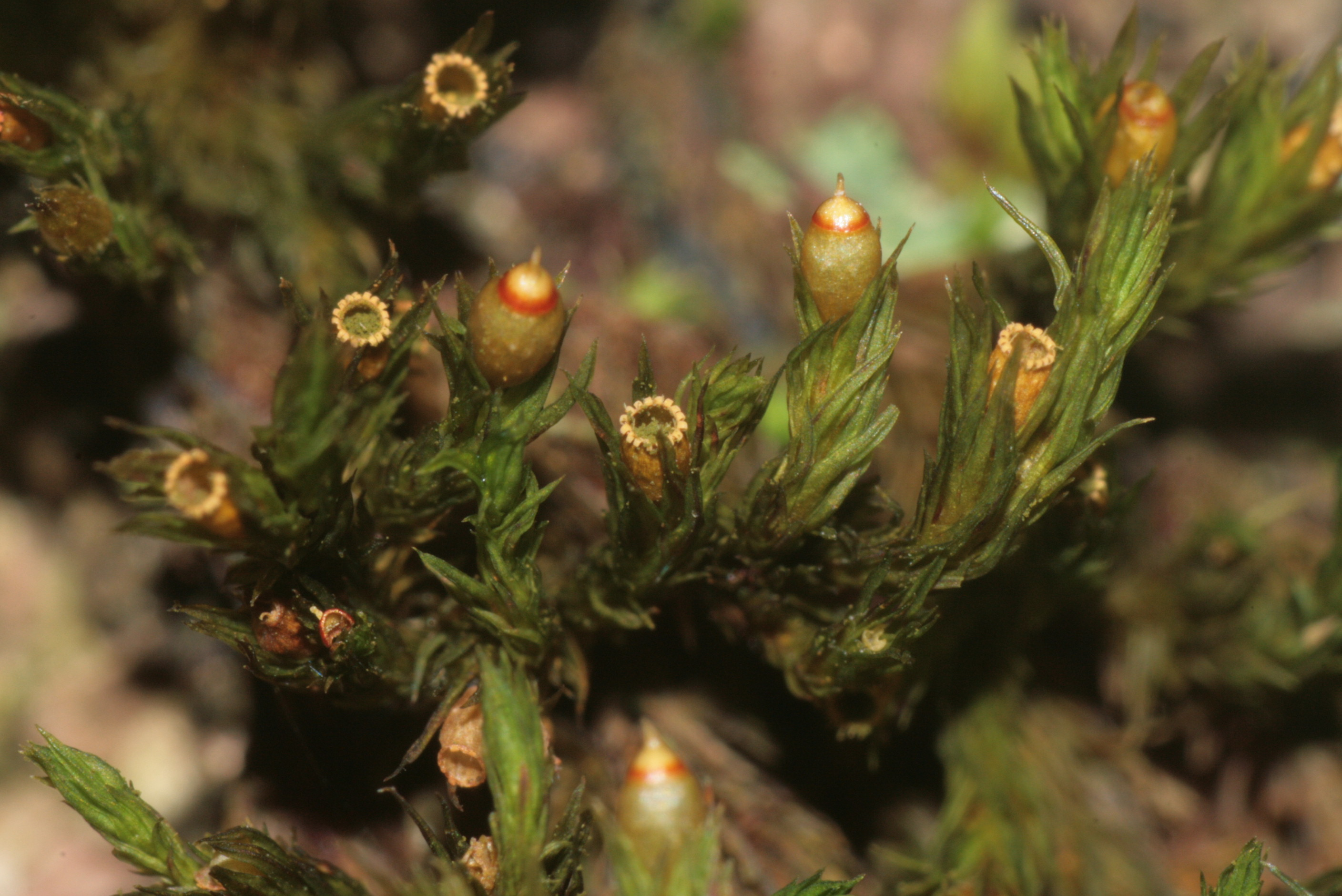
- Orthotrichum striatum

Scientific classification
- Kingdom: Plantae
- Division: Bryophyta
- Class: Bryopsida
- Subclass: Bryidae
- Order: Orthotrichales; Dixon
- Family: Orthotrichaceae; Arn.

Genera
- See text

= Orthotrichaceae =

Family of mosses

Orthotrichaceae is the only family of mosses in the order Orthotrichales. Many species in the family are epiphytic.

== Genera ==
Accepted genera include:

- Amphoridium
- Atlantichella F.Lara, Garilleti & Draper
- Australoria F.Lara, Garilleti & Draper
- Bryomyces Miq.
- Cardotiella Vitt
- Ceuthotheca Lewinsky
- Codonoblepharon Schwägr.
- Desmotheca Lindb.
- Florschuetziella Vitt
- Groutiella Steere
- Leiomitrium Mitt.
- Leratia Broth. & Paris
- Lewinskya F.Lara, Garilleti & Goffinet
- Macrocoma (Hornsch. ex Müll.Hal.) Grout
- Macromitrium Brid.
- Matteria Goffinet
- Nyholmiella Holmen & E.Warncke
- Orthotrichum Hedw.
- Pentastichella Müll.Hal.
- Plenogemma Plášek, Sawicki & Ochyra
- Pulvigera Plášek, Sawicki & Ochyra
- Rehubryum F.Lara, Garilleti & Draper
- Schlotheimia Brid.
- Sehnemobryum Lewinsky & Hedenäs
- Stoneobryum D.H.Norris & H.Rob.
- Uleastrum
- Ulota D.Mohr
- Zygodon Hook. & Taylor

=== Formerly included ===
- Leptodontiopsis – synonym of Zygodon
- Pleurorthotrichum – synonym of Pentastichella
