= A. abbreviata =

A. abbreviata may refer to:

- Achatinella abbreviata, an extinct colorful tropical tree-living air-breathing land snail species
- Abolboda abbreviata, a flowering plant species in the genus Abolboda
- Aechmea abbreviata, a plant species endemic to Ecuador
