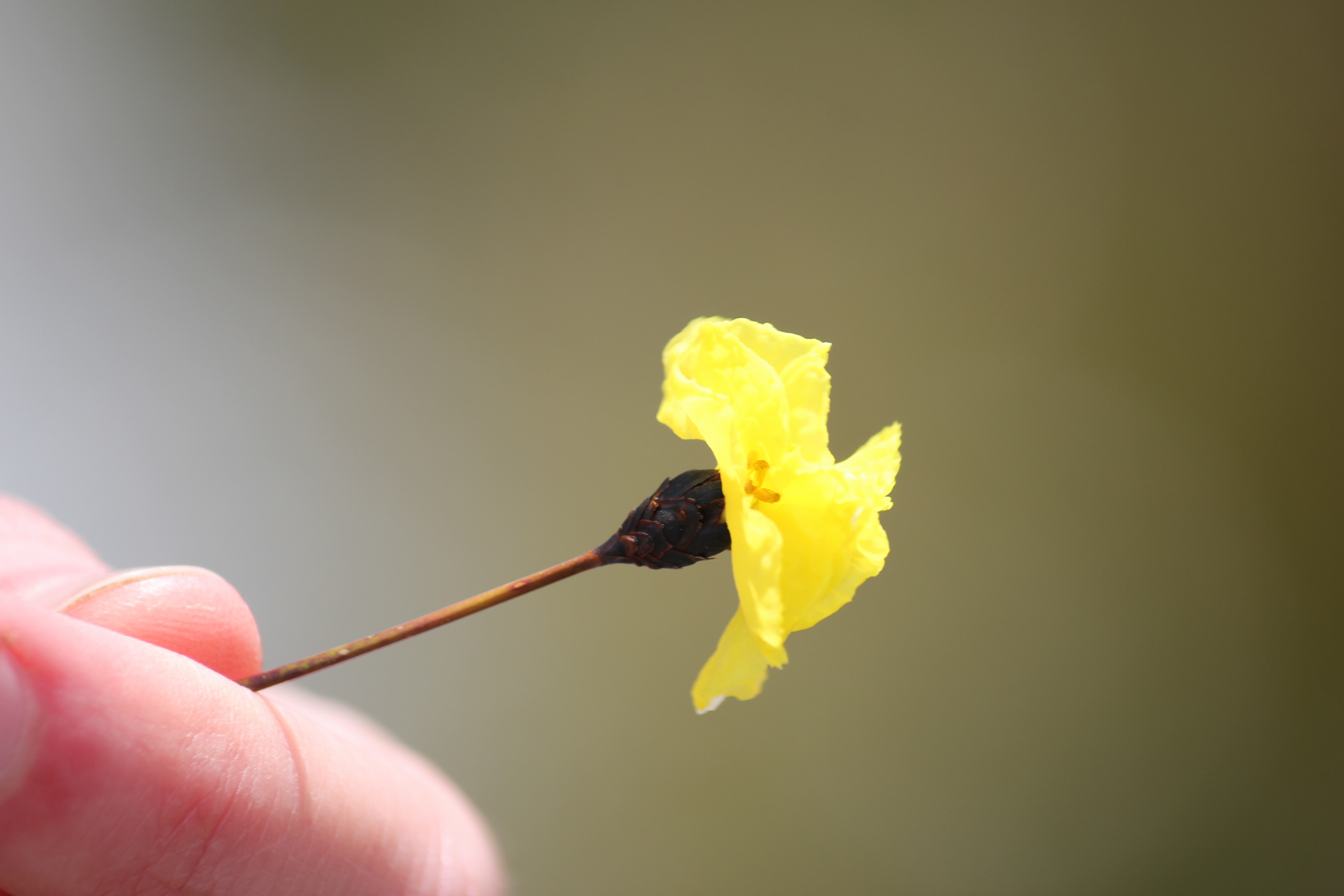

Scientific classification
- Kingdom: Plantae
- Clade: Embryophytes
- Clade: Tracheophytes
- Clade: Angiosperms
- Clade: Monocots
- Clade: Commelinids
- Order: Poales
- Family: Xyridaceae
- Genus: Xyris
- Species: X. marginata

Binomial name
- Xyris marginata Rendle

= Xyris marginata =

Species of flowering plant

Xyris marginata, commonly known as the alpine yellow eye, is a species of monocot flowering plant in the family Xyridaceae. It is endemic to Tasmania and King Island in Australia, where it commonly grows in button grass moorlands at altitudes of up to 1,070 m (3,510 ft) above sea level. The species was first collected by German-Australian botanist Ferdinand von Mueller in 1875, and was formally described by Alfred Barton Rendle in 1899.

== Taxonomy ==
The genus name Xyris is derived from the Latin word for iris, referencing the bright yellow flowers prominent in many species of the genus. The specific epithet marginata refers to the tightly rolled margins of the plant's leaves.

There are four native species of Xyris in Tasmania: X. marginata, X. muelleri, X. operculata, and X. tasmanica. They all occupy waterlogged soils and swamps, with X. marginata thriving at the highest altitudes. X. operculata is the only species in this group that is not endemic to Tasmania.

== Description ==
Xyris marginata is a tufted, perennial herb that forms small tussocks on high-altitude moors. Its most notable characteristics are its golden yellow flowers, twisting stems, and the wavy margins found on the bracts of its inflorescence. The main stalk, which ascends spirally from the roots, is between 15 to 55 cm (5.9 to 21.7 in) long. The leaf blades are 1 mm (0.039 in) broad and thick, featuring a central rib, and are characteristically dark brown and shiny. The leaf margins are rounded except at the awl-shaped tip, and the base sheathing is 4 to 6 cm (1.6 to 2.4 in) long.

Like all Tasmanian species of Xyris, X. marginata flowers between November and January. The flower head is broader towards the top, forming an almost spherical shape. It typically contains three sepals, three petals, and three stamens. The petals are rounded with finely notched margins—a defining trait of the species. The stamens possess anthers that protrude on short filaments, accompanied by hairy staminodes reaching towards the base. The flower also contains a three-lobed capsule that is hardened at the top. The surrounding bracts are dark brown, becoming larger and broader as they ascend the stem; their outlines are curved, irregularly torn, and darker towards the centre.

=== Similar species ===
Altitude is a significant factor in identifying the species in the field, as other Tasmanian Xyris species generally lack the resilience to survive at high altitudes. X. operculata can be differentiated from X. marginata by its slender, erect leaves, distinguishing it from the spring-like, spiralled leaves of X. marginata. Additionally, X. operculata features three stamens reduced to hairy tufts alongside its three regular stamens. X. muelleri has leaves that curl upwards and are pointed at the ends, with petals that have consistent, smooth margins. X. tasmanica shares the consistent margins of X. muelleri but lacks leaves close to the flower head.

== Distribution and habitat ==
Xyris marginata is primarily found in wet heaths and button grass moorlands across King Island, as well as the north-west, west, east, and south-west coasts of Tasmania.

Button grass moorlands occupy approximately 14% of the state of Tasmania. This habitat includes alpine areas in the western and south-western regions, highlands in the north-east, and lowland heath pockets in the eastern and south-eastern parts of the island. The Tasmanian Department of Natural Resources and Environment defines these moorlands as vegetation typically less than 2 m (6 ft 7 in) in height, dominated by the hummock-forming button grass (Gymnoschoenus sphaerocephalus). This encompasses various sub-types, including sparse moorlands on slopes, pure button grass moorlands, and moorlands with emergent shrubs.

== Ecology ==
The button grass (Gymnoschoenus sphaerocephalus) is the defining ecological feature of the marshes where Xyris marginata thrives. The depth of the peat substrate in these moorlands varies greatly; it can erode to a thickness of just 1 cm (0.39 in) over mineral soils or, more commonly, quartz gravels. These moorlands develop on flats, slopes, ridges, and mountain plateaus that are highly vulnerable to frequent fires. The soils are characteristically infertile and drain poorly, yet they support a high level of biodiversity, with approximately 272 vascular plant species recorded in this habitat, a third of which are endemic to Tasmania.

== Conservation ==
While there are no specific, independent conservation objectives exclusively for Xyris marginata, its primary habitat—the button grass moors—is actively managed and protected by the Tasmanian Government. The majority of this moorland is publicly owned, resistant to invasive weeds, and maintained through controlled burning regimes when required.
