= Xyris scabrifolia =

Scientific classification
- Kingdom: Plantae
- Clade: Tracheophytes
- Clade: Angiosperms
- Clade: Monocots
- Clade: Commelinids
- Order: Poales
- Family: Xyridaceae
- Genus: Xyris
- Species: X. scabrifolia

Binomial name
- Xyris scabrifolia Bull. Torrey Bot. Club, 1903

Synonyms
- Xyris chapmanii

Species of yelloweyed grass

Xyris scabrifolia, common name Harper's yelloweyed grass, is a North American species of perennial in the yellow-eyed-grass family. It grows in the southern United States from Texas to North Carolina.
