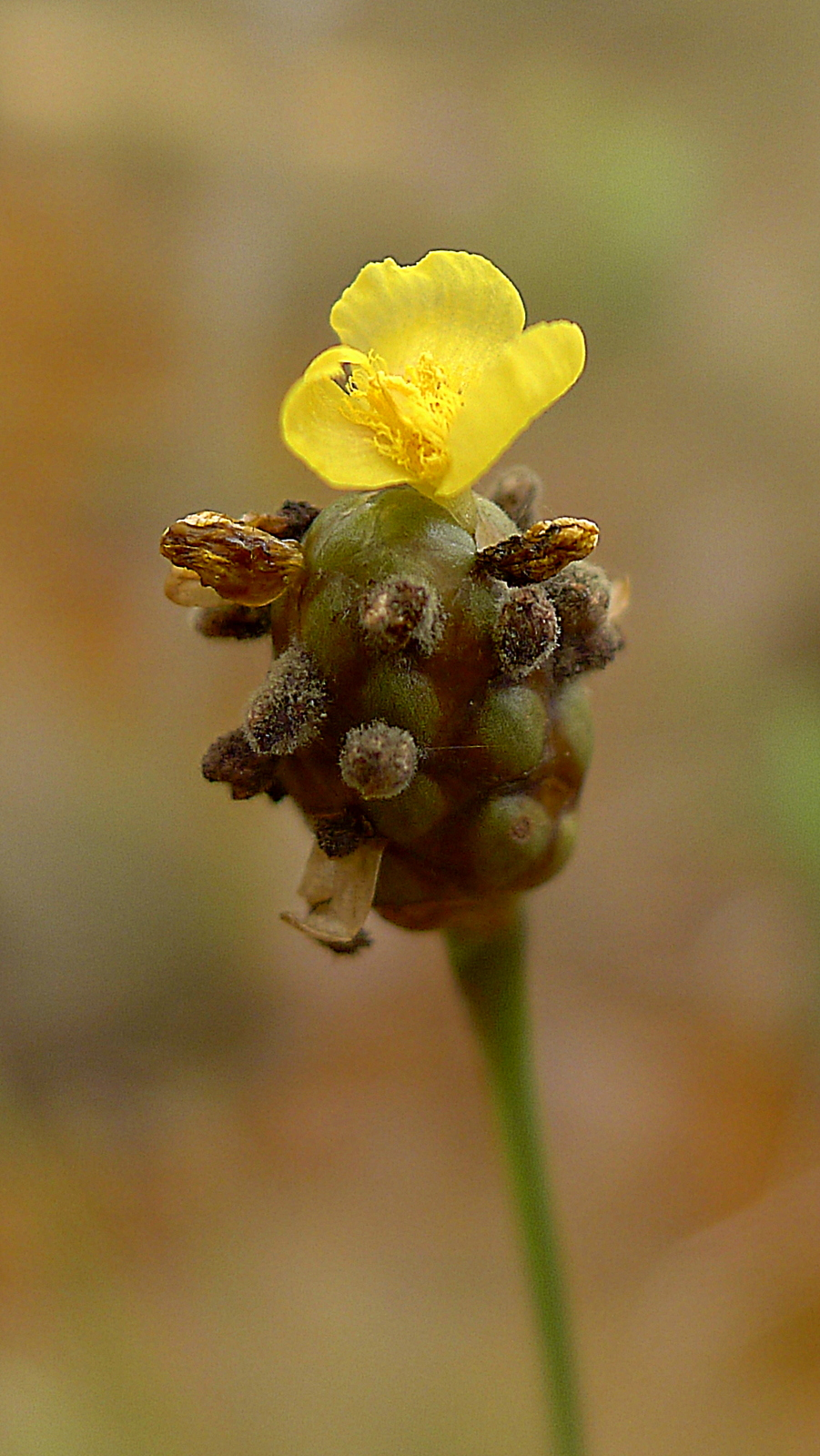

Scientific classification
- Kingdom: Plantae
- Clade: Tracheophytes
- Clade: Angiosperms
- Clade: Monocots
- Clade: Commelinids
- Order: Poales
- Family: Xyridaceae
- Genus: Xyris
- Species: X. jupicai

Binomial name
- Xyris jupicai Rich. 1792 not Xyris jupicae Michx. 1803

Synonyms
- List: Xyris acuminata Miq. ex Steud.; Xyris anceps Pers. 1805 not Lam. 1791; Xyris arenicola Miq.; Xyris communis Kunth; Xyris gymnoptera Griseb.; Xyris jupicae Michx.; Xyris jupicai var. brachylepis Malme; Xyris jupicai var. humilis (Kunth) Malme; Xyris laxifolia var. minor Mart.; Xyris laxifolia var. sellowiana (Kunth) Seub.; Xyris macrocephala Vahl; Xyris macrocephala f. minor (Mart.) Malme; Xyris macrocephala var. minor (Mart.) L.A.Nilsson; Xyris macrocephala f. minor (Mart.) M. Kuhlm. & Kuhn; Xyris partita Chapm. ex Ries; Xyris sellowiana Kunth; Xyris sellowiana f. humilis Kunth; Xyris surinamensis Miq. 1843 not Spreng. 1828

= Xyris jupicai =

Species of yelloweyed grass

Xyris jupicai, common name Richard's yelloweyed grass, is a New World species of flowering plant in the yellow-eyed-grass family. It is widespread in North America, South America, Mesoamerica, and the West Indies.

Xyris jupicai is a perennial herb up to 100 cm (40 inches) tall with grass-like leaves up to 60 cm (2 feet) long, and yellow flowers.
