= Xyris asperula =

Scientific classification
- Kingdom: Plantae
- Clade: Tracheophytes
- Clade: Angiosperms
- Clade: Monocots
- Clade: Commelinids
- Order: Poales
- Family: Xyridaceae
- Genus: Xyris
- Species: X. asperula

Binomial name
- Xyris asperula Mart. 1841 not Seub. 1855

Synonyms
- List: Xyris zahlbruckneri Heimerl

Species of yelloweyed grass

Xyris asperula is an uncommon South American species of flowering plants in the yellow-eyed-grass family. It has been found in Bolivia and also in the States of Goiás and Minas Gerais in Brazil.
