= Xyris stricta =

Scientific classification
- Kingdom: Plantae
- Clade: Tracheophytes
- Clade: Angiosperms
- Clade: Monocots
- Clade: Commelinids
- Order: Poales
- Family: Xyridaceae
- Genus: Xyris
- Species: X. stricta

Binomial name
- Xyris stricta Chapm. 1860

Synonyms
- List: Xyris louisianica E.L.Bridges & Orzell

Species of yelloweyed grass

Xyris stricta, the pineland yelloweyed grass, is a North American species of flowering plants in the yellow-eyed-grass family. It grows on the coastal plain of the southern United States from the Carolinas to Texas.

Xyris stricta is a perennial herb with a stem up to 100 cm (40 inches) tall with long, narrow leaves up to 60 cm (5 feet) long but generally less than 10 mm (0.4 inches) wide.
