= Xyris ambigua =

Scientific classification
- Kingdom: Plantae
- Clade: Tracheophytes
- Clade: Angiosperms
- Clade: Monocots
- Clade: Commelinids
- Order: Poales
- Family: Xyridaceae
- Genus: Xyris
- Species: X. ambigua

Binomial name
- Xyris ambigua Beyr. ex Kunth 1843

Synonyms
- Xyris rhombipetala C.Wright

Species of yelloweyed grass

Xyris ambigua, the coastal plain yelloweyed grass, is a North American species of flowering plant in the yellow-eyed-grass family. It is native to southern and eastern Mexico (Tamaulipas, Veracruz, Tabasco, Chiapas, the Yucatán), Central America (Belize, Honduras, Nicaragua), Cuba, and the southeastern and south-central United States (from Texas to Virginia inland to Tennessee and Arkansas).

Xyris ambigua is a perennial herb up to 100 cm (40 inches) tall with grass-like leaves and yellow flowers. The leaves of X. ambigua reach approximately 15 to 40 centimeters (6 to 15 inches) in length.
