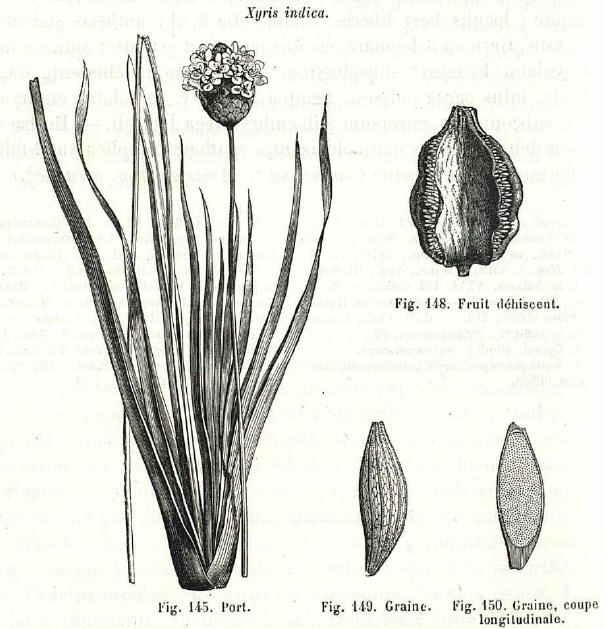
- 1894 drawing

Scientific classification
- Kingdom: Plantae
- Clade: Tracheophytes
- Clade: Angiosperms
- Clade: Monocots
- Clade: Commelinids
- Order: Poales
- Family: Xyridaceae
- Genus: Xyris
- Species: X. caroliniana

Binomial name
- Xyris caroliniana Walter 1788

Synonyms
- List: Kotsjiletti flexuosa (Muhl. ex Elliott) Nieuwl.; Ramotha floridana Raf.; Xyris arenicola Small 1903 not Miq. 1844; Xyris canadensis Schnizl.; Xyris caroliniana var. brevifolia (Michx.) Alph.Wood; Xyris caroliniana f. flaccida Fernald; Xyris caroliniana f. phyllolepis Fernald; Xyris caroliniana var. scabra Engelm. & A.Gray; Xyris conocephala C.Wright; Xyris conocephala var. pallescens (C.Mohr) Malme; Xyris fimbriata Beyr. ex Kunth 1843 not Elliott 1816; Xyris flexuosa Muhl. ex Elliott; Xyris flexuosa var. pallescens (Small) Barnhart; Xyris glabra Engelm. ex Ries; Xyris graminifolia Chapm. ex Ries; Xyris indica Pursh; Xyris pallescens Small; Xyris scabra Engelm.; Xyris torta var. pallescens C.Mohr

= Xyris caroliniana =

Species of yelloweyed grass

Xyris caroliniana, the Carolina yelloweyed grass, is a North American species of flowering plant in the yellow-eyed-grass family. It is native to Cuba and to the coastal plain of the southern and eastern United States from eastern Texas to New Jersey.

Xyris caroliniana is a perennial herb up to 100 cm (40 inches) tall with narrow leaves up to 50 cm (20 inches) long, and yellow flowers.

Within the United States' Florida and Georgia, this species has been observed in habitat such as mesic sandy meadows, wiregrass-longleaf pinewoods, and slash pine woodlands.
