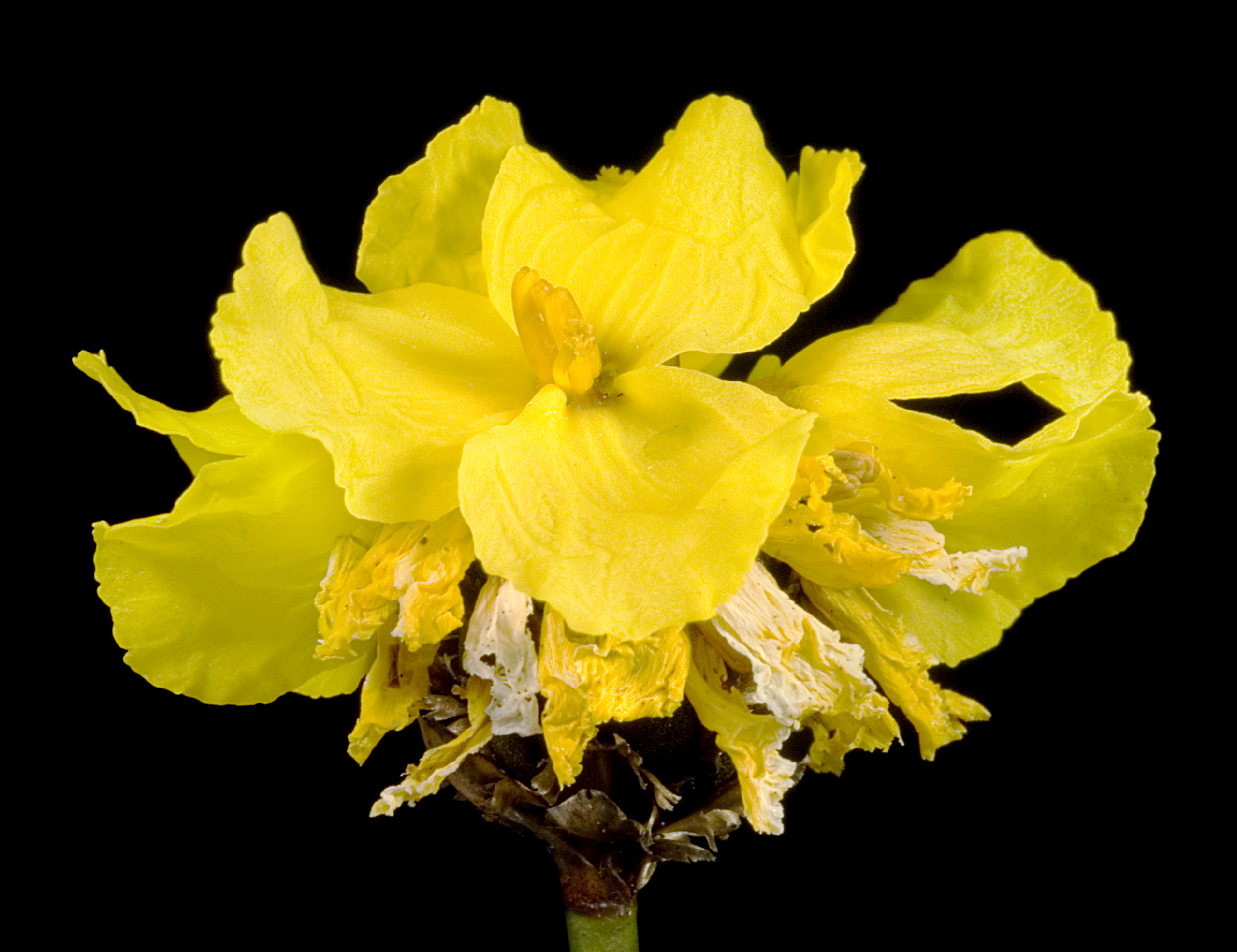

Scientific classification
- Kingdom: Plantae
- Clade: Tracheophytes
- Clade: Angiosperms
- Clade: Monocots
- Clade: Commelinids
- Order: Poales
- Family: Xyridaceae
- Genus: Xyris
- Species: X. lacera

Binomial name
- Xyris lacera R.Br.

= Xyris lacera =

Species of yelloweyed grass

Xyris lacera, is a yellow-eye found in the southern parts of Western Australia, in swampy areas. It is a tufted perennial herb, growing from 0.2 to 1.5 metres tall. This is one of the many plants first published by Robert Brown, appearing in his Prodromus Florae Novae Hollandiae et Insulae Van Diemen in 1810.
