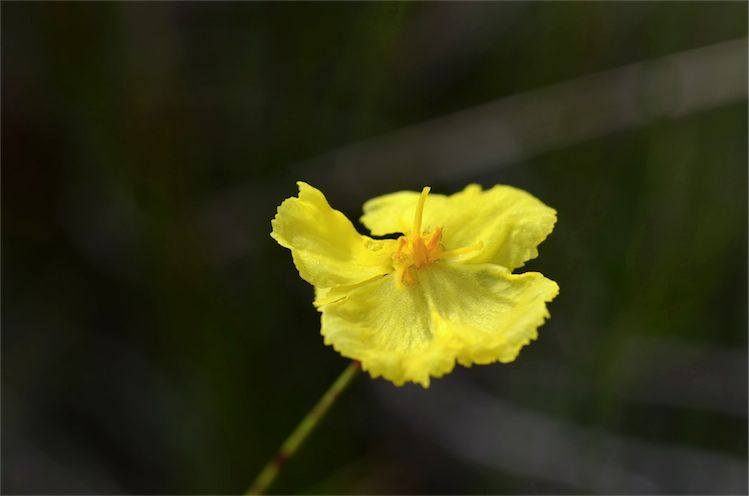
- In Boonoo Boonoo National Park

Scientific classification
- Kingdom: Plantae
- Clade: Tracheophytes
- Clade: Angiosperms
- Clade: Monocots
- Clade: Commelinids
- Order: Poales
- Family: Xyridaceae
- Genus: Xyris
- Species: X. gracilis

Binomial name
- Xyris gracilis R.Br.

= Xyris gracilis =

Species of yelloweyed grass

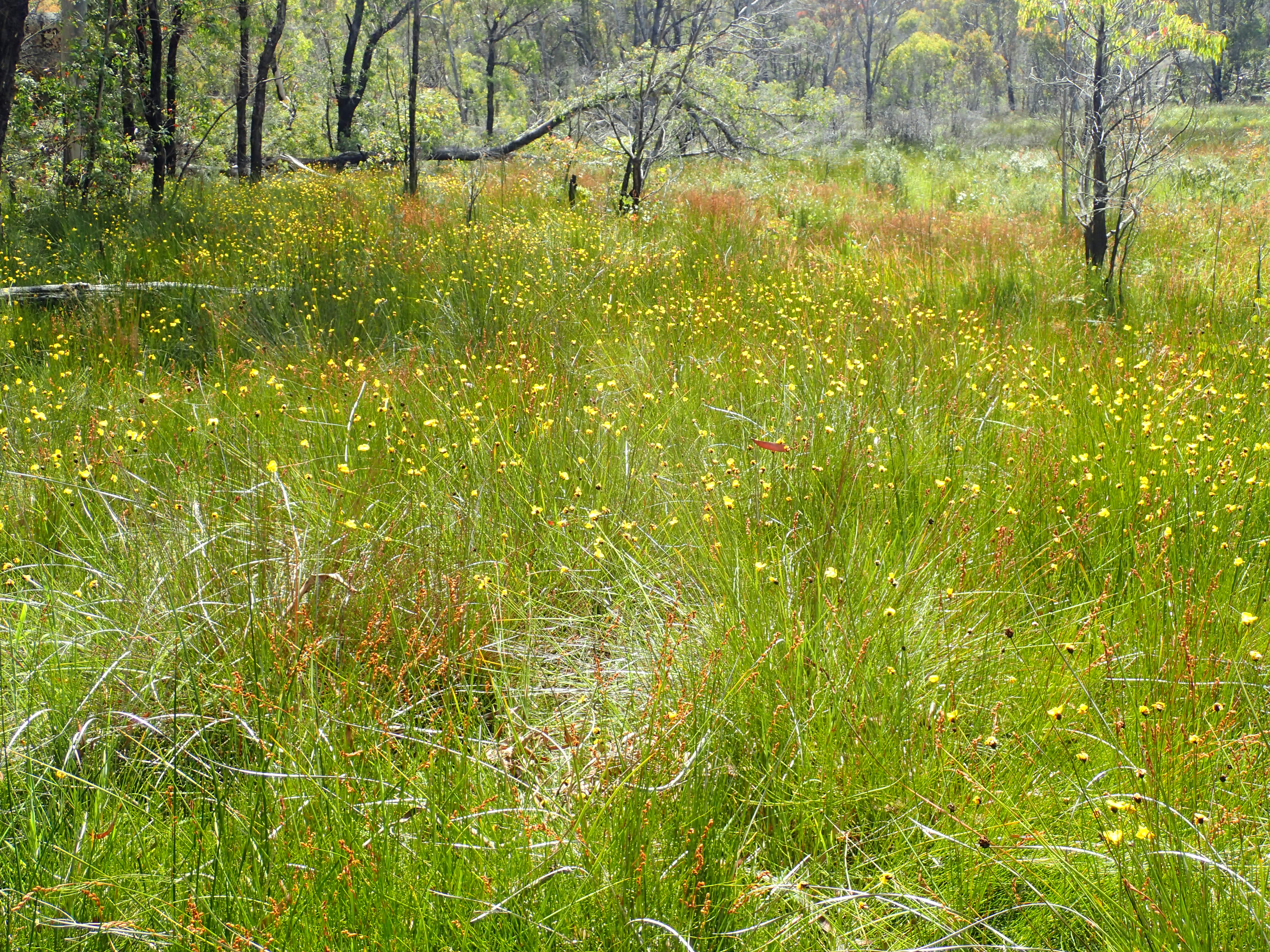
Habit in Cathedral Rock National Park

Xyris gracilis, commonly known as slender yellow-eye, is a species of flowering plant in the family Xyridaceae and is endemic to eastern Australia. It is a tufted herb with linear leaves with 5 to 8 flowering stems with bright yellow flowers.

== Description ==
Xyris gracilis is a tufted herb with flat, linear leaves 60–29 cm (24–11 in) long and 1–4 mm (0.039–0.157 in) wide with a sheathing base 14–60 mm (0.55–2.36 in) long and brown or reddish. There are usually 5 to 8 yellow inflorescences, each 5–8 mm (0.20–0.31 in) on flowering stems 27–66 cm (11–26 in) long, each inflorescence with 6 to 14 bracts arranged in 3 to 5 whorls and the flowers opening one at a time. The style is 5–6 mm (0.20–0.24 in) long with branches 2–4 mm (0.079–0.157 in) long. Flowering occurs in December and January.

== Taxonomy ==
Xyris gracilis was first formally described in 1810 by Robert Brown in Prodromus Florae Novae Hollandiae et Insulae Van Diemen. The specific epithet (gracilis) means "slender".

== Distribution and habitat ==
Slender yellow-eye grows in moist or swampy areas, often in heath, and is widespread on the coast and ranges of New South Wales and southern Victoria.
