= Xyris serotina =

Scientific classification
- Kingdom: Plantae
- Clade: Tracheophytes
- Clade: Angiosperms
- Clade: Monocots
- Clade: Commelinids
- Order: Poales
- Family: Xyridaceae
- Genus: Xyris
- Species: X. serotina

Binomial name
- Xyris serotina Chapm. 1860

Synonyms
- List: Xyris fascicularis Chapm. ex Ries

Species of yelloweyed grass

Xyris serotina, the acidswamp yelloweyed grass, is a North American species of flowering plants in the yellow-eyed-grass family. It grows on the coastal plain of the southeastern United States from eastern Louisiana to the Carolinas.

Xyris serotina is a perennial herb with a stem up to 60 cm (2 feet) tall with long, narrow leaves up to 20 cm (8 inches) long.
