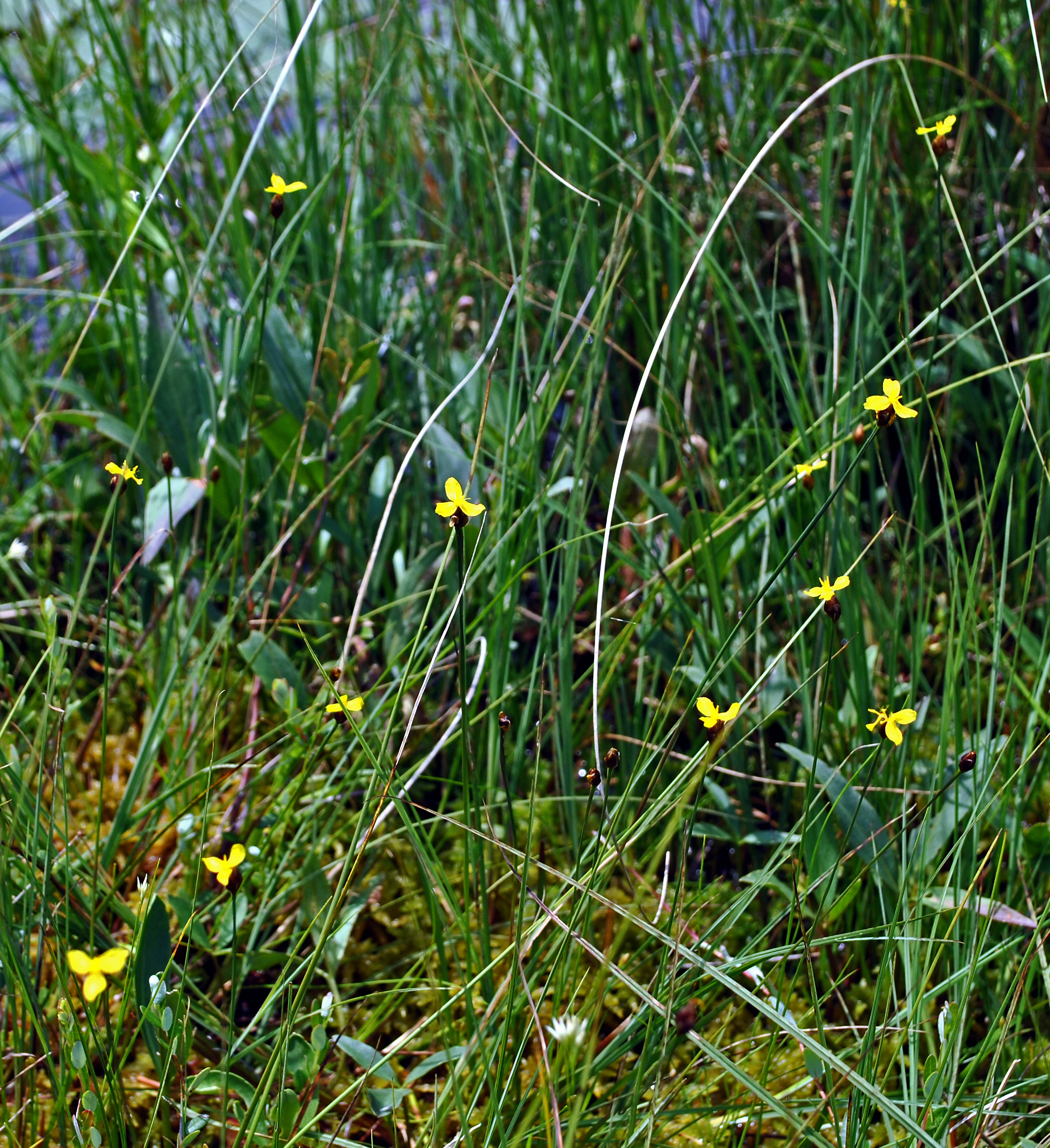

Conservation status
- Secure (NatureServe)

- Least Concern (IUCN 3.1)

Scientific classification
- Kingdom: Plantae
- Clade: Tracheophytes
- Clade: Angiosperms
- Clade: Monocots
- Clade: Commelinids
- Order: Poales
- Family: Xyridaceae
- Genus: Xyris
- Species: X. montana

Binomial name
- Xyris montana Ries 1892

Synonyms
- List: Xyris flexuosa var. pusilla A. Gray 1868 not Xyris pusilla R. Br. 1810; Xyris montana f. albiflora B.Boivin; Xyris montana f. bracteosa Haberer; Xyris papillosa Fassett; Xyris papillosa var. exserta Fassett

= Xyris montana =

Species of yelloweyed grass

Xyris montana, the northern yelloweyed grass, is a perennial herbaceous flowering plant in the family Xyridaceae. It grows in eastern and central Canada (from Ontario to Newfoundland) and in the northeastern and north-central United States (from Minnesota to New England and New Jersey).

== Description ==
Xyris montana is a perennial herb up to 30 cm (12 inches) tall with long, narrow, deep-green leaves up to 15 cm (6 inches) long but less than 3 mm (0.12 inches) wide.

The species typically flowers from the summer to fall.

== Distribution and habitat ==
Xryis montana has been found in eastern and central Canada (Ontario to the island of Newfoundland) and in the northeastern and north-central United States (Minnesota to New England and New Jersey).

=== Habitat ===
This species grows in wetlands, banks of streams, and shores of glacial lakes at elevations of 0–500 m (0–1,640 ft) above sea level. Most known populations of this species occur in areas that were affected by the Wisconsin glaciation.

== Conservation ==
As of December 2024, the conservation group NatureServe listed Xyris montana as Secure (G5) worldwide. This status was last reviewed on 17 August 2015.

In individual states and provinces, it is listed as Secure (S5) in New York; Apparently Secure (S4) in Nova Scotia, Ontario, and Pennsylvania; Vulnerable (S3) in Minnesota, Newfoundland, New Brunswick, and Quebec; Imperiled (S2) in Connecticut and possibly Massachusetts; Critically Imperiled (S1) in New Jersey, Rhode Island, and Vermont; and No Status Rank (not assessed) in Maine, New Hampshire, and Wisconsin.

The largest threat to this species, according to NatureServe, is the destruction of wetland habitats for peat mining, infrastructure development, or other human activities.

== Taxonomy ==
The name Xyris montana was first published by Heinrich Ries in 1892. The name was published as a replacement name to Xyris flexuosa var. pusilla A. Gray 1868.

=== Etymology ===
The specific epithet montana means "of the mountains". In English, this species is known as the northern yelloweyed grass, and in French, the species is known as xyris des montagnes.
