= Xyris panacea =

Scientific classification
- Kingdom: Plantae
- Clade: Tracheophytes
- Clade: Angiosperms
- Clade: Monocots
- Clade: Commelinids
- Order: Poales
- Family: Xyridaceae
- Genus: Xyris
- Species: X. panacea

Binomial name
- Xyris panacea L.C.Anderson & Kral 2008

Species of yelloweyed grass

Xyris panacea, also called St. Marks yelloweyed grass, is a rare North American species of flowering plant in the yellow-eyed-grass family. It has been found only in the Florida Panhandle in the southeastern United States.

Xyris panacea is a perennial herb up to 130 cm (52 inches or 4 1/3 feet) tall with long and narrow leaves up to 50 cm (20 inches) long, and yellow flowers.
