= Xyris isoetifolia =

Scientific classification
- Kingdom: Plantae
- Clade: Tracheophytes
- Clade: Angiosperms
- Clade: Monocots
- Clade: Commelinids
- Order: Poales
- Family: Xyridaceae
- Genus: Xyris
- Species: X. isoetifolia

Binomial name
- Xyris isoetifolia Kral 1966

Synonyms
- Xyris isoëtifolia Kral., acceptable alternate spelling

Species of aquatic plant

Xyris isoetifolia, the quillwort yelloweyed grass, is a plant species native to southern Alabama and to the Florida panhandle, where it is found in coastal plains, Sphagnum bogs, and the edges of sinkholes.

Xyris isoetifolia is a perennial herb up to 40 cm (16 inches) tall. Leaves are rather narrow, and twisted, rarely more than 1 mm in width but up to 15 cm (6 inches) long, thus superficially resembling those of Isoetes.
