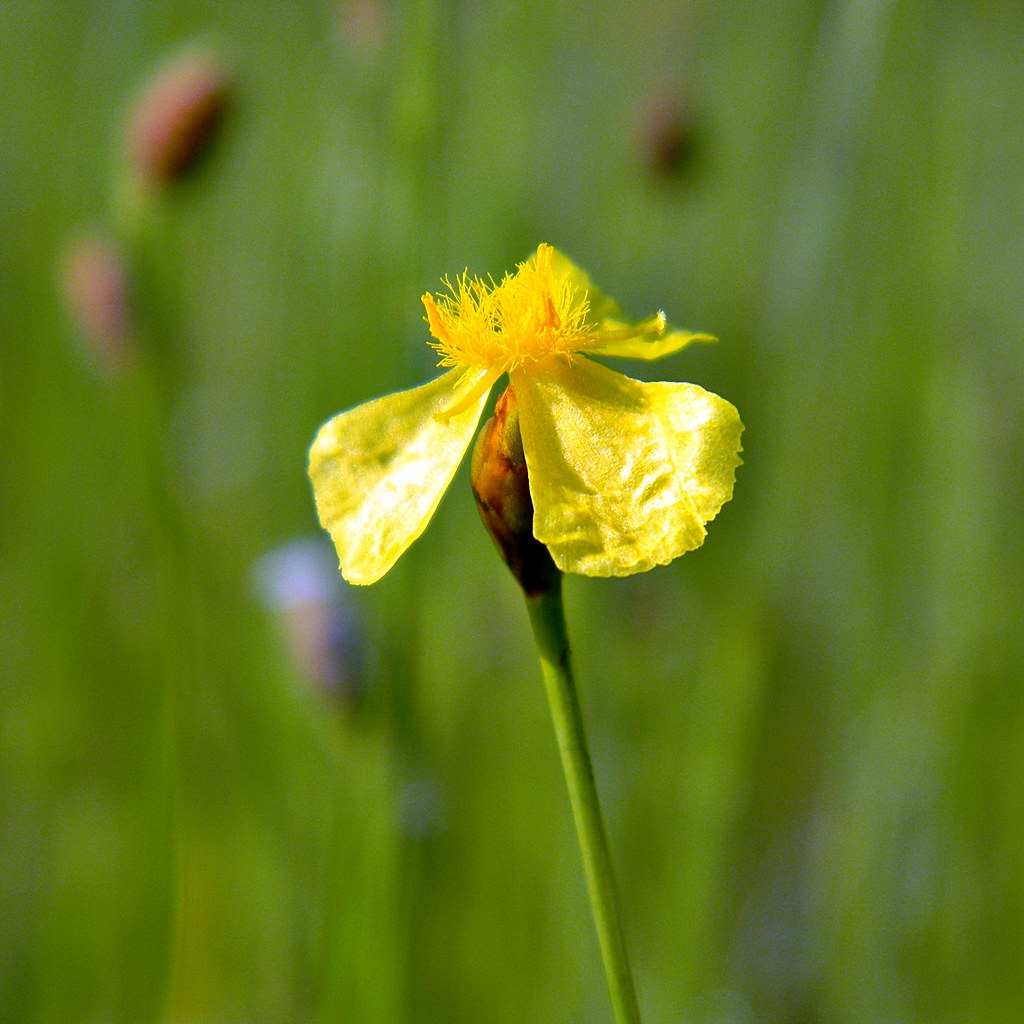

Conservation status
- Least Concern (IUCN 3.1)

Scientific classification
- Kingdom: Plantae
- Clade: Embryophytes
- Clade: Tracheophytes
- Clade: Spermatophytes
- Clade: Angiosperms
- Clade: Monocots
- Clade: Commelinids
- Order: Poales
- Family: Xyridaceae
- Genus: Xyris
- Species: X. difformis

Binomial name
- Xyris difformis Chapm.

Synonyms
- List: Xyris difforme Chapm.; Xyris elata Chapm.; Xyris bayardii Fernald; Xyris curtissii Malme; Xyris neglecta Small 1894 not Alb.-Nilsson 1891; Xyris floridana (Kral) E.L.Bridges & Orzell

= Xyris difformis =

Species of yelloweyed grass

Xyris difformis, the bog yelloweyed grass, is a North American species of flowering plant in the yellow-eyed-grass family. It is native to the eastern and southern United States, eastern and central Canada, and Central America.

Xyris difformis is a perennial herb up to 90 cm (3 feet) tall with grass-like leaves up to 50 cm (20 inches) long, and yellow flowers.

Varieties

- Xyris difformis var. curtissii (Malme) Kral - Belize, coastal states of USA from Texas to Virginia
- Xyris difformis var. difformis - Nova Scotia, Ontario, USA (coastal states from Maine to Texas plus areas as far inland as Michigan, Oklahoma, Indiana, and Arkansas)
- Xyris difformis var. floridana Kral - Belize, Honduras, Nicaragua, USA (coastal states from Louisiana to the Carolinas)
