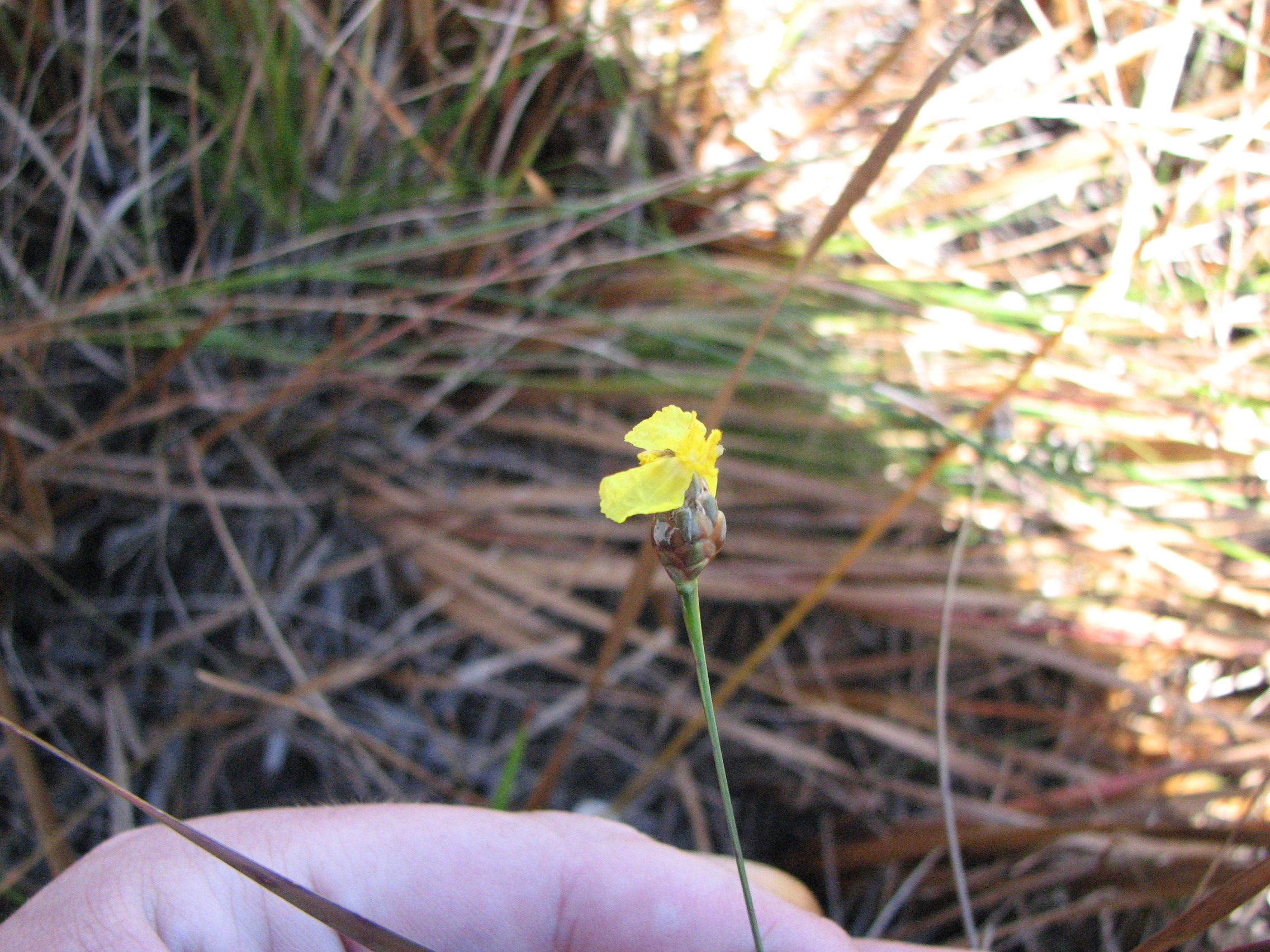

Scientific classification
- Kingdom: Plantae
- Clade: Tracheophytes
- Clade: Angiosperms
- Clade: Monocots
- Clade: Commelinids
- Order: Poales
- Family: Xyridaceae
- Genus: Xyris
- Species: X. smalliana

Binomial name
- Xyris smalliana Nash (1895)

Synonyms
- List: Xyris caroliniana var. olneyi Alph.Wood; Xyris congdonii Small; Xyris smalliana var. congdonii (Small) Malme; Xyris smalliana var. olneyi (Alph.Wood) Gleason

= Xyris smalliana =

Species of yelloweyed grass

Xyris smalliana, Small's yelloweyed grass, is a North American species of flowering plants in the yellow-eyed-grass family. It grows on the coastal plain of the eastern and southern United States from Maine to Texas, as well as in Cuba, Central America, and the State of Tabasco in southern Mexico.

Xyris smalliana is a perennial herb with a stem up to 60 cm (2 feet) tall with long, narrow leaves up to 20 cm (8 inches) long.
