= Xyris drummondii =

Scientific classification
- Kingdom: Plantae
- Clade: Tracheophytes
- Clade: Angiosperms
- Clade: Monocots
- Clade: Commelinids
- Order: Poales
- Family: Xyridaceae
- Genus: Xyris
- Species: X. drummondii

Binomial name
- Xyris drummondii Malme 1933

Species of yelloweyed grass

Xyris drummondii, common name Drummond's yelloweyed grass, is a North American species of flowering plant in the yellow-eyed-grass family. It is native to the coastal plain of the United States from Georgia to eastern Texas.

Xyris drummondii is a perennial herb up to 25 cm (10 inches) tall with grass-like, olvie-green leaves up to 40 cm (4 inches) long, and yellow flowers.
