= Xyris baldwiniana =

Scientific classification
- Kingdom: Plantae
- Clade: Tracheophytes
- Clade: Angiosperms
- Clade: Monocots
- Clade: Commelinids
- Order: Poales
- Family: Xyridaceae
- Genus: Xyris
- Species: X. baldwiniana

Binomial name
- Xyris baldwiniana Schult. 1822

Synonyms
- List: Xuris fistulosa Raf.; Xyris baldwiniana var. tenuifolia (Chapm.) Malme; Xyris fistulosa Raf.; Xyris juncea Baldwin ex Elliott 1816 not R.Br. 1810; Xyris setacea Chapm.; Xyris stenophylla Chapm. ex Ries 1892 not L.A. Nilsson 1892; Xyris tenuifolia Chapm.

Species of yelloweyed grass

Xyris baldwiniana, common name Baldwin's yelloweyed grass, is a North American species of flowering plant in the yellow-eyed-grass family. It is native to southern Mexico (Chiapas), Central America (Belize, Honduras, Nicaragua), and the southeastern and south-central United States (from Texas to North Carolina).

Xyris baldwiniana is a perennial herb up to 50 cm (20 inches) tall with grass-like leaves and yellow flowers.
