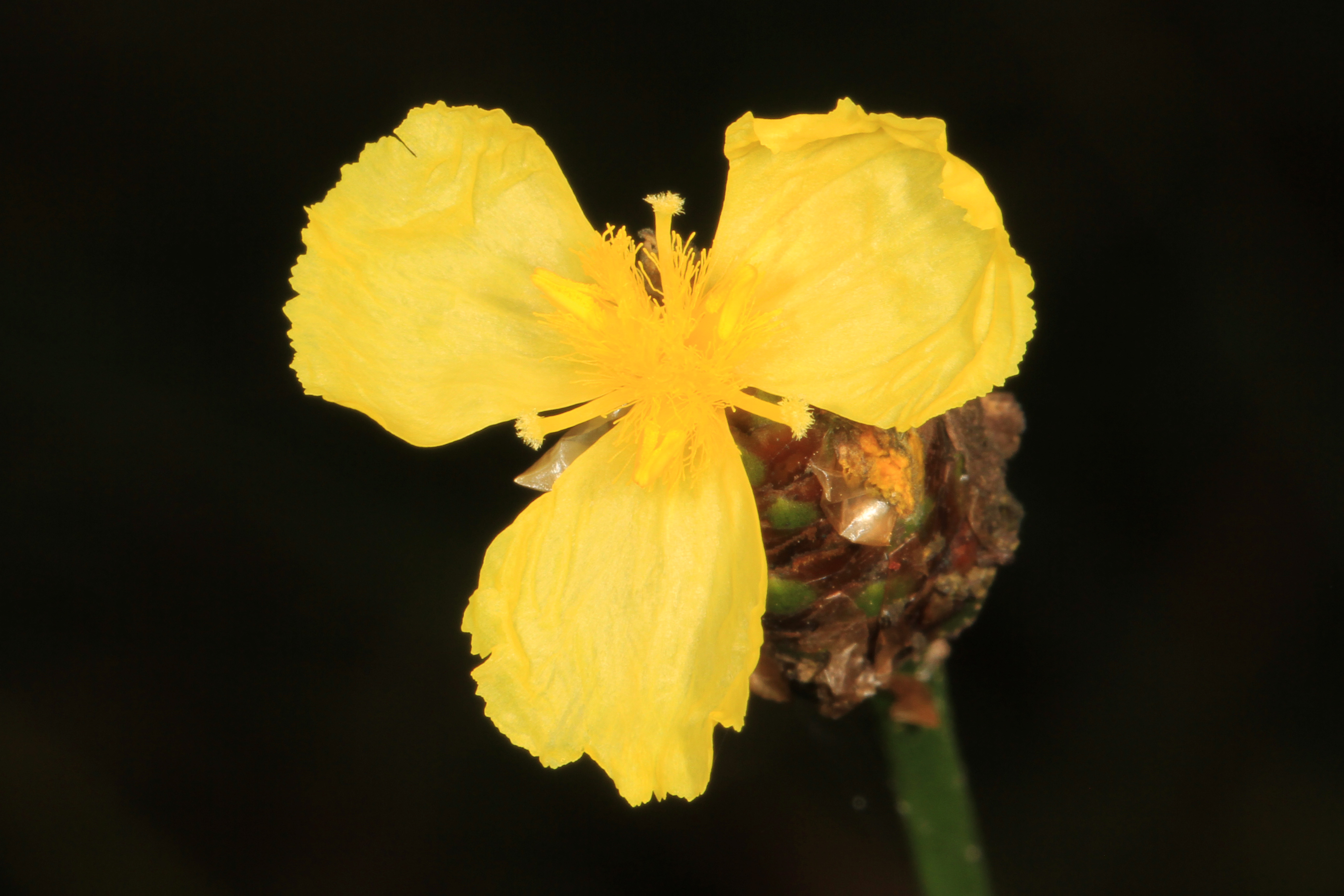

Scientific classification
- Kingdom: Plantae
- Clade: Tracheophytes
- Clade: Angiosperms
- Clade: Monocots
- Clade: Commelinids
- Order: Poales
- Family: Xyridaceae
- Genus: Xyris
- Species: X. fimbriata

Binomial name
- Xyris fimbriata Elliott 1816 not Beyr. ex Kunth 1843

Synonyms
- Jupica albiflora Raf.; Xyris albiflora Raf.; Xyris spiralis Raf.

= Xyris fimbriata =

Species of yelloweyed grass

Xyris fimbriata, the fringed yelloweyed grass, is a North American species of flowering plant in the yellow-eyed-grass family. It is native to the coastal plain of the United States from eastern Texas to New Jersey.

Xyris fimbriata is a perennial herb up to 150 cm (5 feet) tall with grass-like, olive-green leaves up to 70 cm (28 inches) long, and yellow flowers.
