= Xyris elliottii =

Conservation status
- Least Concern (IUCN 3.1)

Scientific classification
- Kingdom: Plantae
- Clade: Tracheophytes
- Clade: Angiosperms
- Clade: Monocots
- Clade: Commelinids
- Order: Poales
- Family: Xyridaceae
- Genus: Xyris
- Species: X. elliottii

Binomial name
- Xyris elliottii Chapm.

Species of yelloweyed grass

Xyris elliottii, common name Elliott's yelloweyed grass, is a North American species of flowering plant in the yellow-eyed-grass family. It is native to the coastal plain of the United States from Mississippi to South Carolina plus southern Mexico (Tabasco), Central America (Belize, Nicaragua) and the West Indies (Cuba, Puerto Rico).

Xyris elliottii is a perennial herb up to 25 cm (10 inches) tall with grass-like, olive-green leaves up to 40 cm (4 inches) long, and yellow flowers.

It occurs in environments such as wet pine flatwoods, lake shores, hardwood hammocks, and cypress domes. It may also be found in disturbed habitats.
