= Xyris longisepala =

Scientific classification
- Kingdom: Plantae
- Clade: Tracheophytes
- Clade: Angiosperms
- Clade: Monocots
- Clade: Commelinids
- Order: Poales
- Family: Xyridaceae
- Genus: Xyris
- Species: X. longisepala

Binomial name
- Xyris longisepala Kral 1966

Species of yelloweyed grass

Xyris longisepala, common name Kral's yelloweyed grass, is an uncommon North American species of flowering plants in the yellow-eyed-grass family. It has been found only in a small region in the southeastern United States: southeastern Alabama and the Florida Panhandle.

Xyris longisepala is a perennial herb up to 90 cm (3 feet) tall with long, narrow leaves up to 30 cm (12 inches) long but only 3 mm (0.12 inches) wide.

Xyris longisepala is listed as an endangered species in Florida.
