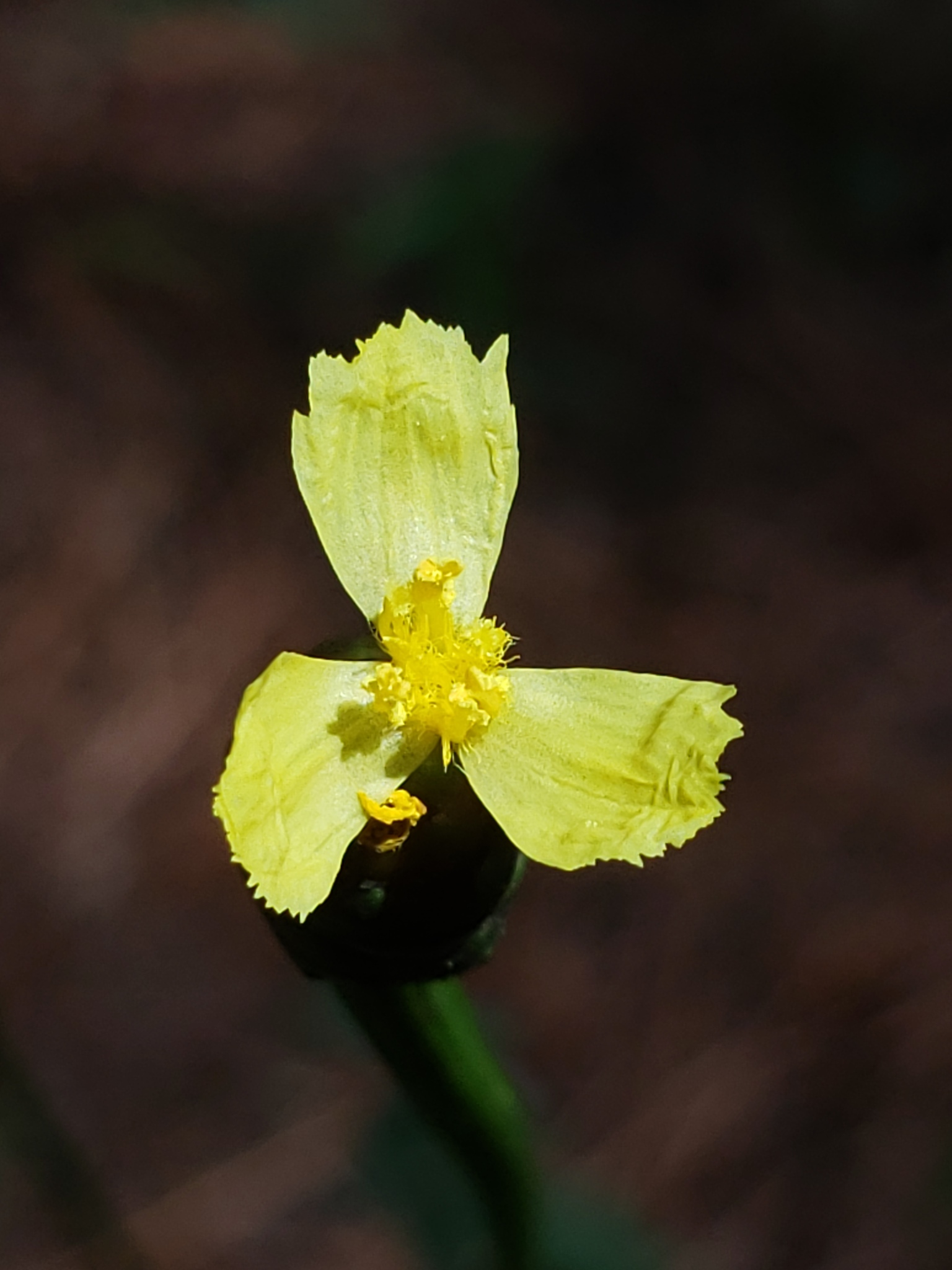

Scientific classification
- Kingdom: Plantae
- Clade: Tracheophytes
- Clade: Angiosperms
- Clade: Monocots
- Clade: Commelinids
- Order: Poales
- Family: Xyridaceae
- Genus: Xyris
- Species: X. platylepis

Binomial name
- Xyris platylepis Chapm. 1860

= Xyris platylepis =

Species of yelloweyed grass

Xyris platylepis, the tall yelloweyed grass, is a North American species of flowering plants in the yellow-eyed-grass family. It grows on the coastal plain of the southeastern and south-central United States from eastern Texas to Virginia.

Xyris platylepis is a perennial herb up to 10 cm (4 inches) tall with long, narrow leaves up to 50 cm (20 inches) long. It can be found growing in habitat types such as sandhill seeps, savannahs, and other.
