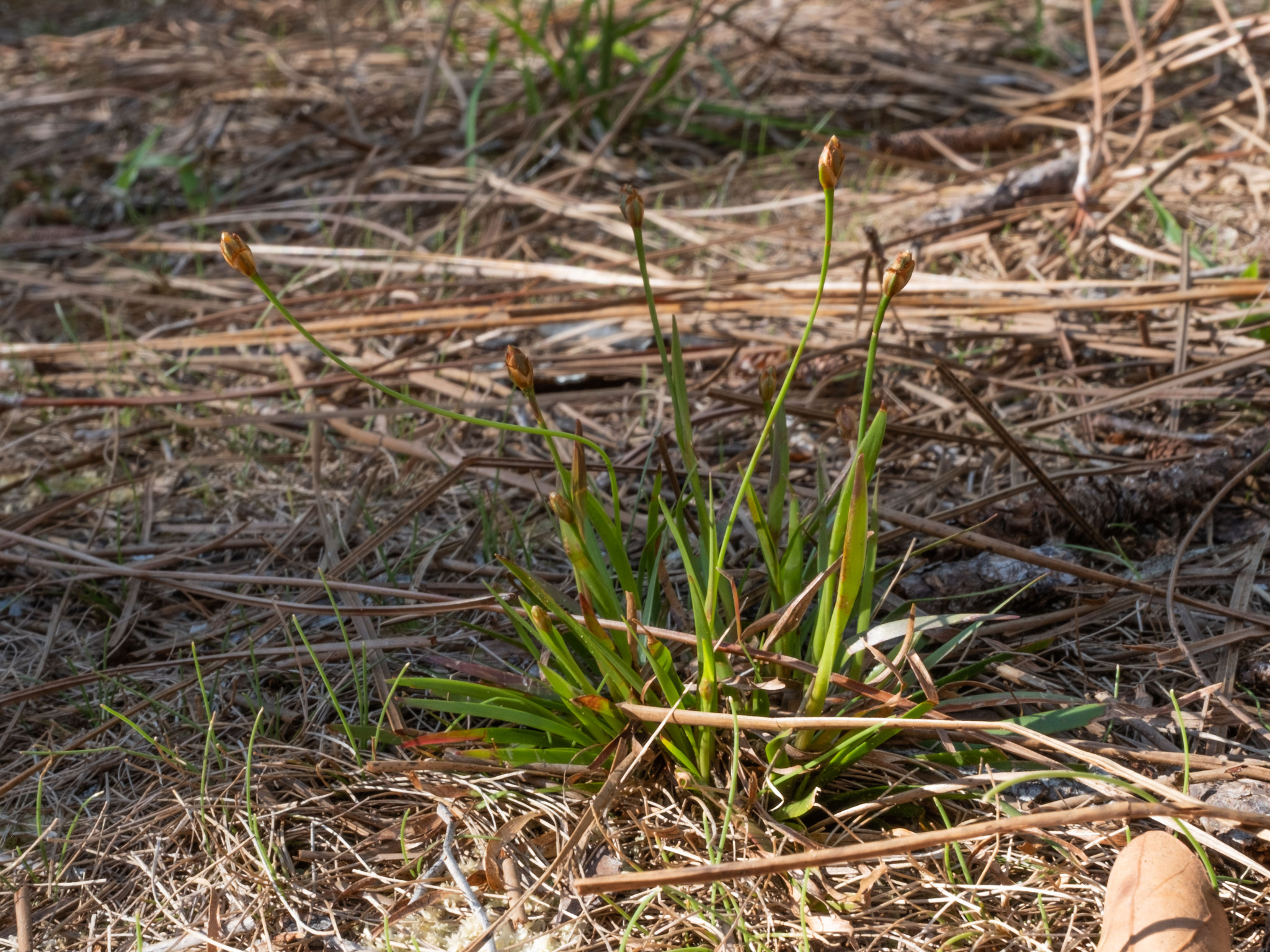

Scientific classification
- Kingdom: Plantae
- Clade: Tracheophytes
- Clade: Angiosperms
- Clade: Monocots
- Clade: Commelinids
- Order: Poales
- Family: Xyridaceae
- Genus: Xyris
- Species: X. brevifolia

Binomial name
- Xyris brevifolia Michx. 1803 not Elliott 1816

Synonyms
- List: Xyris intermedia Malme

= Xyris brevifolia =

Species of yelloweyed grass

Xyris brevifolia, the shortleaf yelloweyed grass, is a North American species of flowering plant in the yellow-eyed-grass family. It is native to Brazil, the West Indies, and the southeastern United States (Florida, Alabama, Georgia, and the Carolinas).

Xyris brevifolia is a perennial herb up to 60 cm (2 feet) tall with narrow leaves up to 15 cm (6 inches) long, and yellow flowers.

It is found most commonly in habitat types such as river floodplains, coastal mesic flatwoods, and cypress depression swamps. It also occurs in disturbed habitats.
