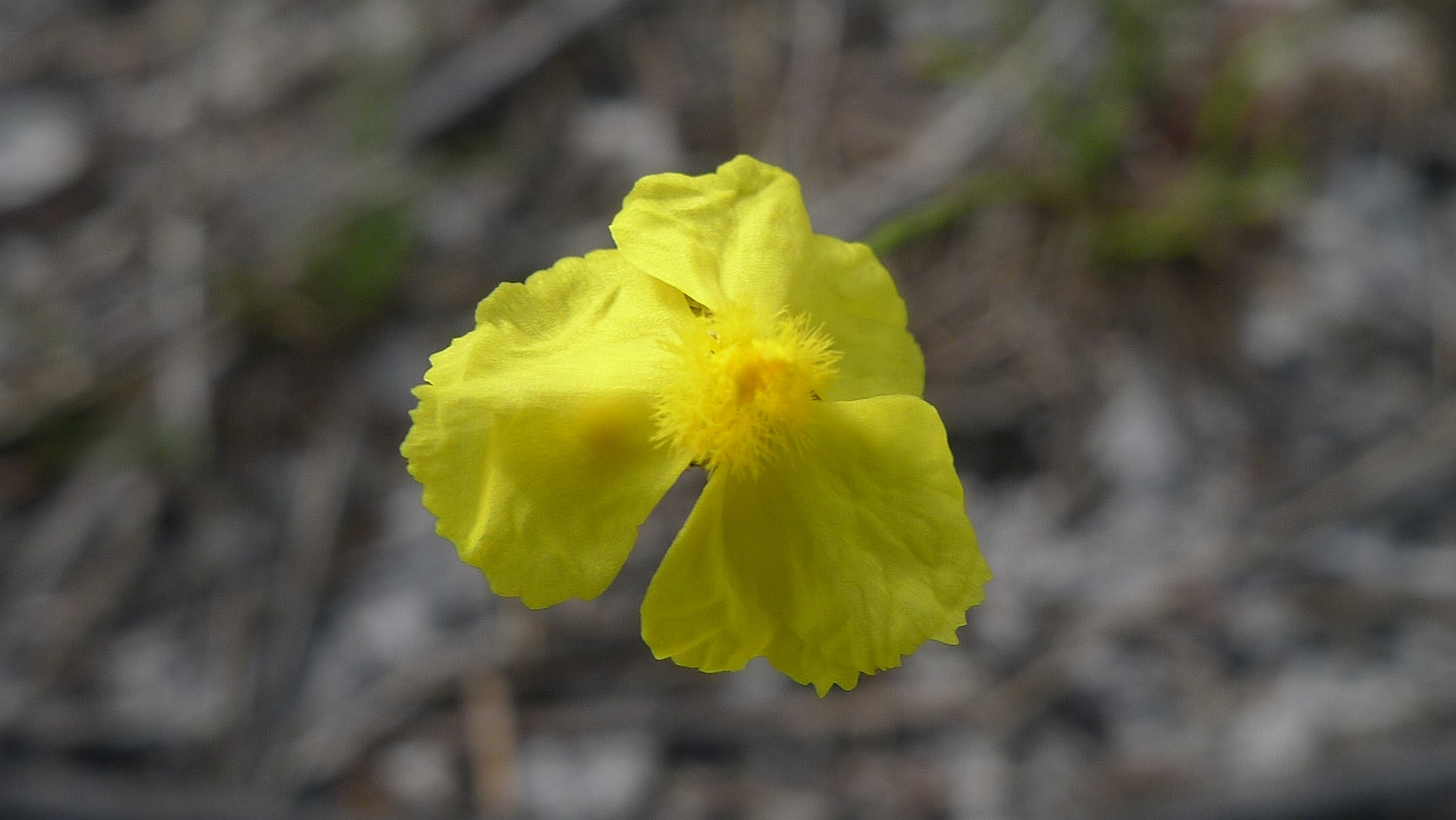

Scientific classification
- Kingdom: Plantae
- Clade: Tracheophytes
- Clade: Angiosperms
- Clade: Monocots
- Clade: Commelinids
- Order: Poales
- Family: Xyridaceae
- Genus: Xyris
- Species: X. juncea

Binomial name
- Xyris juncea R.Br.

= Xyris juncea =

Species of yelloweyed grass

Xyris juncea, the dwarf yellow-eye, is a species of flowering plant found in northern and eastern Australia. It is widespread in swampy areas. It is a tufted herb, growing up to 30 cm high. This is one of the many plants first published by Robert Brown with the type known as "(J.) v.v." Appearing in his Prodromus Florae Novae Hollandiae et Insulae Van Diemen in 1810. The specific epithet juncea is derived from Latin, meaning a resemblance to a sedge.
