= Xyris laxiflora =

Scientific classification
- Kingdom: Plantae
- Clade: Tracheophytes
- Clade: Angiosperms
- Clade: Monocots
- Clade: Commelinids
- Order: Poales
- Family: Xyridaceae
- Genus: Xyris
- Species: X. laxiflora

Binomial name
- Xyris laxiflora F.Muell. 1874

Synonyms
- List: Xyris iridifolia Chapm.; Xyris conifera Chapm. ex Ries; Xyris rigida Chapm. ex Ries

Species of yelloweyed grass

Warning: This article is all goofed up. Xyris laxifolia is a New World species of flowering plants in the yellow-eyed-grass family. It is widespread in North America, South America and Mesoamerica.

Xyris laxifolia is a perennial herb up to 90 cm (3 feet) tall with grass-like leaves up to 70 cm (28 inches) long and 25 mm (1 inch) wide.
