= Xyris flabelliformis =

Scientific classification
- Kingdom: Plantae
- Clade: Tracheophytes
- Clade: Angiosperms
- Clade: Monocots
- Clade: Commelinids
- Order: Poales
- Family: Xyridaceae
- Genus: Xyris
- Species: X. flabelliformis

Binomial name
- Xyris flabelliformis Chapm. 1860

Synonyms
- Xyris scirpoides Chapm. ex Ries

Species of yelloweyed grass

Xyris flabelliformis, the savannah yelloweyed grass, is a North American species of flowering plant in the yellow-eyed-grass family. It is native to the coastal plain of the United States from eastern Mississippi to the Carolinas.

Xyris flabelliformis is a perennial herb up to 30 cm (12 inches) tall with thread-like leaves up to 10 cm (4 inches) long, and yellow flowers.
