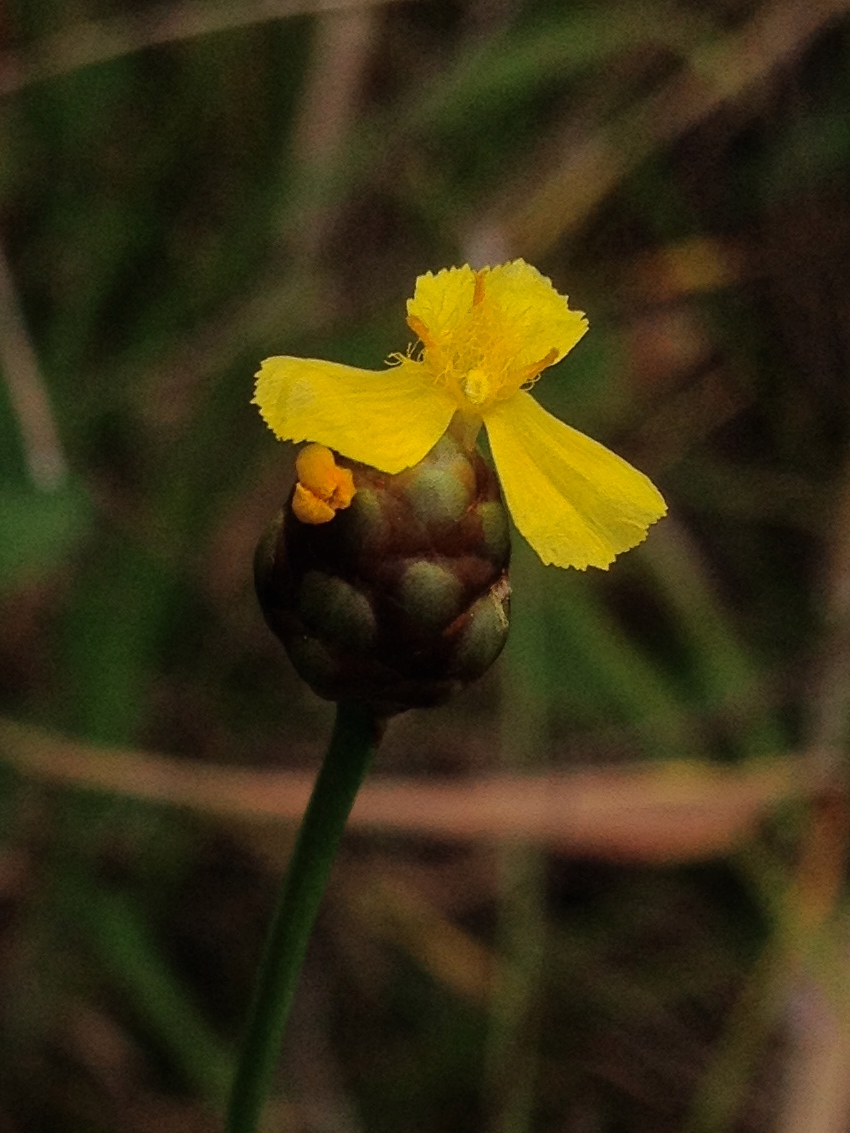

Scientific classification
- Kingdom: Plantae
- Clade: Tracheophytes
- Clade: Angiosperms
- Clade: Monocots
- Clade: Commelinids
- Order: Poales
- Family: Xyridaceae
- Genus: Xyris
- Species: X. torta

Binomial name
- Xyris torta Sm. 1819 not Kunth 1843

Synonyms
- List: Xyris bulbosa Kunth; Xyris bulbosa var. minor Alph.Wood; Xyris purshii Sweet; Xyris torta var. macropoda Fernald; Xyris torta var. occidentalis Malme

= Xyris torta =

Species of yelloweyed grass

Xyris torta, the slender yelloweyed grass, is a North American species of flowering plant in the yellow-eyed-grass family. It is widespread in the central and eastern United States from New Hampshire to Georgia, west as far as Minnesota, Nebraska, and eastern Texas.

Xyris torta is a perennial herb with a stem up to 100 cm (40 inches) tall with long, narrow twisted leaves up to 50 cm (20 inches) long but generally less than 5 mm (0.2 inches) wide.
