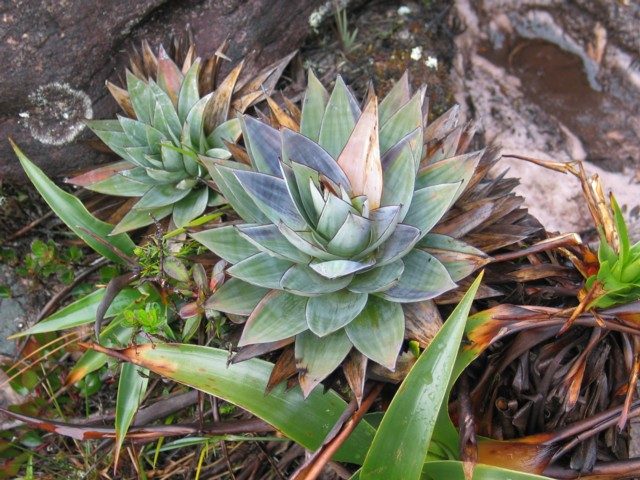
- Orectanthe sceptrum on Mount Roraima, Venezuela

Scientific classification
- Kingdom: Plantae
- Clade: Tracheophytes
- Clade: Angiosperms
- Clade: Monocots
- Clade: Commelinids
- Order: Poales
- Family: Xyridaceae
- Genus: Orectanthe; Maguire

= Orectanthe =

Genus of flowering plants

Orectanthe is a genus of flowering plants, in the family Xyridaceae, first described as a genus in 1958. It is native to the tepui of northern South America (Venezuela, Guyana, and northwestern Brazil). It is closely related to Abolboda, and both known species were originally classified as members of Abolboda before being transferred to Orectanthe.

Species

- Orectanthe ptaritepuiana (Steyerm.) Maguire - Venezuela, Guyana, northwestern Brazil
- Orectanthe sceptrum (Oliv.) Maguire - Venezuela, Guyana, northwestern Brazil
