= Xyris andina =

Conservation status
- Critically Endangered (IUCN 3.1)

Scientific classification
- Kingdom: Plantae
- Clade: Tracheophytes
- Clade: Angiosperms
- Clade: Monocots
- Clade: Commelinids
- Order: Poales
- Family: Xyridaceae
- Genus: Xyris
- Species: X. andina

Binomial name
- Xyris andina Malme 1913

Species of yelloweyed grass

Xyris andina is a species of plant in the Xyridaceae family. It is endemic to Ecuador. Its natural habitat is subtropical or tropical moist montane forests, and much of its range now under threat of habitat destruction.
