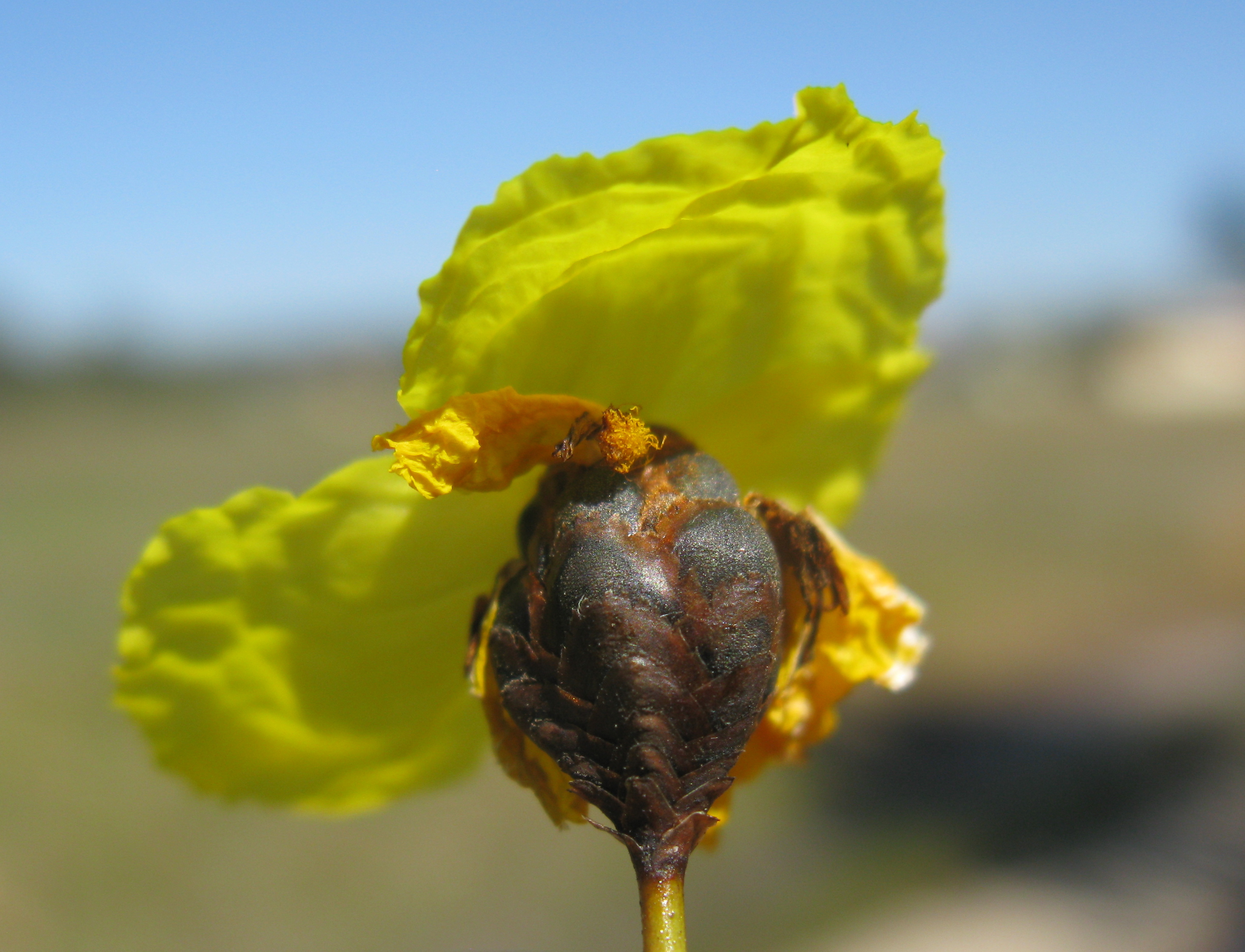

Scientific classification
- Kingdom: Plantae
- Clade: Tracheophytes
- Clade: Angiosperms
- Clade: Monocots
- Clade: Commelinids
- Order: Poales
- Family: Xyridaceae
- Genus: Xyris
- Species: X. operculata

Binomial name
- Xyris operculata Labill.

= Xyris operculata =

Species of yelloweyed grass

Xyris operculata, the tall yellow-eye, is a flowering plant species endemic to south eastern Australia. Seen in swampy areas, often in heathland. A tufted herb, growing up to 1 metre high. This is one of the many plants first published by Jacques Labillardière, appearing in his Novae Hollandiae Plantarum Specimen in 1805. The specific epithet operculata is derived from Latin. Referring to the hardened tip of the fruiting capsule, which does not divide when the capsule splits, and may be seen being cast aside like a lid.
