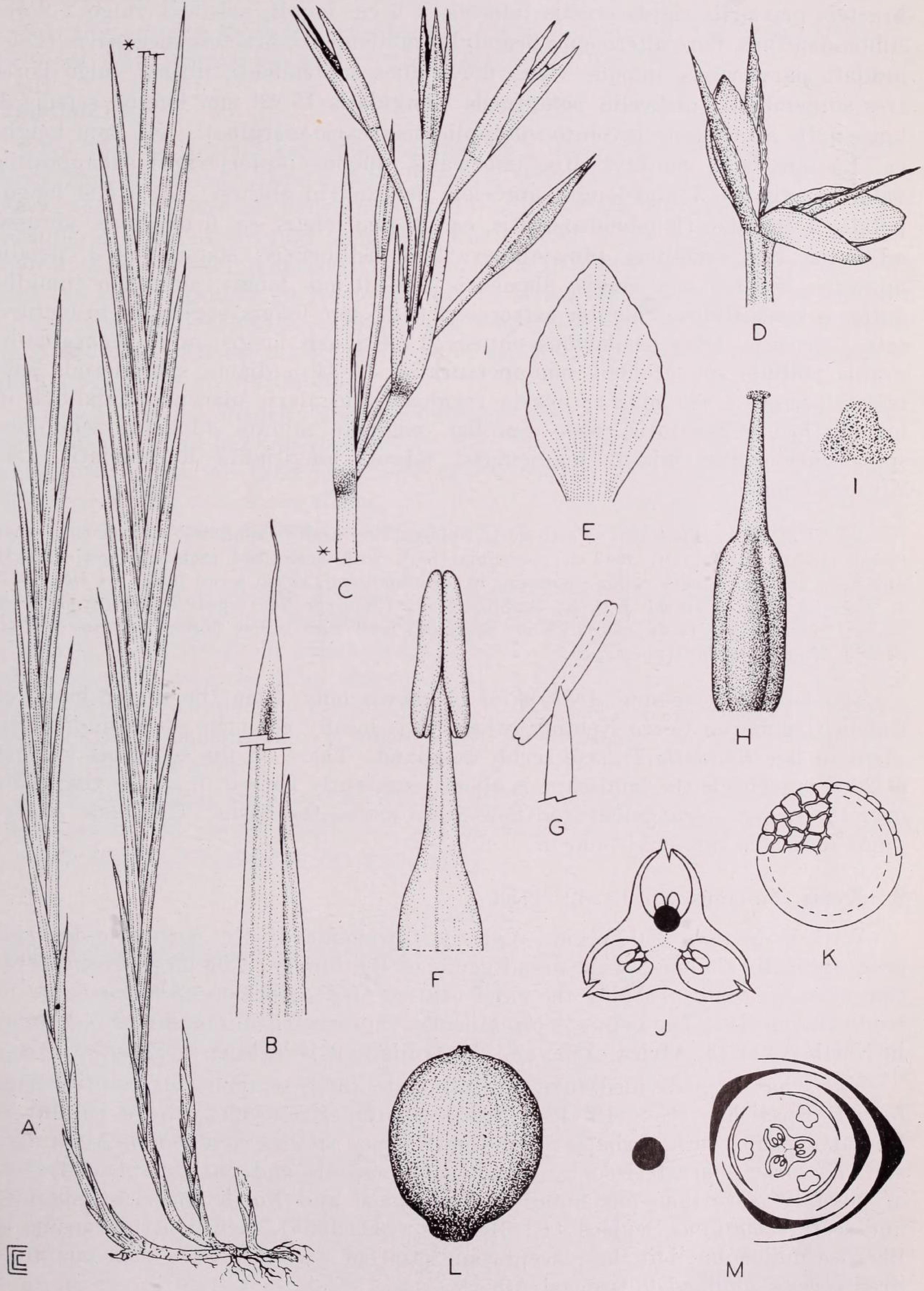
- Illustration accompanying the protologue of the genus and its only species.

Scientific classification
- Kingdom: Plantae
- Clade: Tracheophytes
- Clade: Angiosperms
- Clade: Monocots
- Clade: Commelinids
- Order: Poales
- Family: Xyridaceae
- Genus: Achlyphila; Maguire & Wurdack
- Species: A. disticha

Binomial name
- Achlyphila disticha Maguire & Wurdack

= Achlyphila =

Genus of flowering plants

Achlyphila is a genus of plants in the Xyridaceae, first described as a genus in 1960. It contains only one known species, Achlyphila disticha, endemic to the Serranía de la Neblina National Park in the State of Amazonas in southern Venezuela, very close to the border with Brazil.
