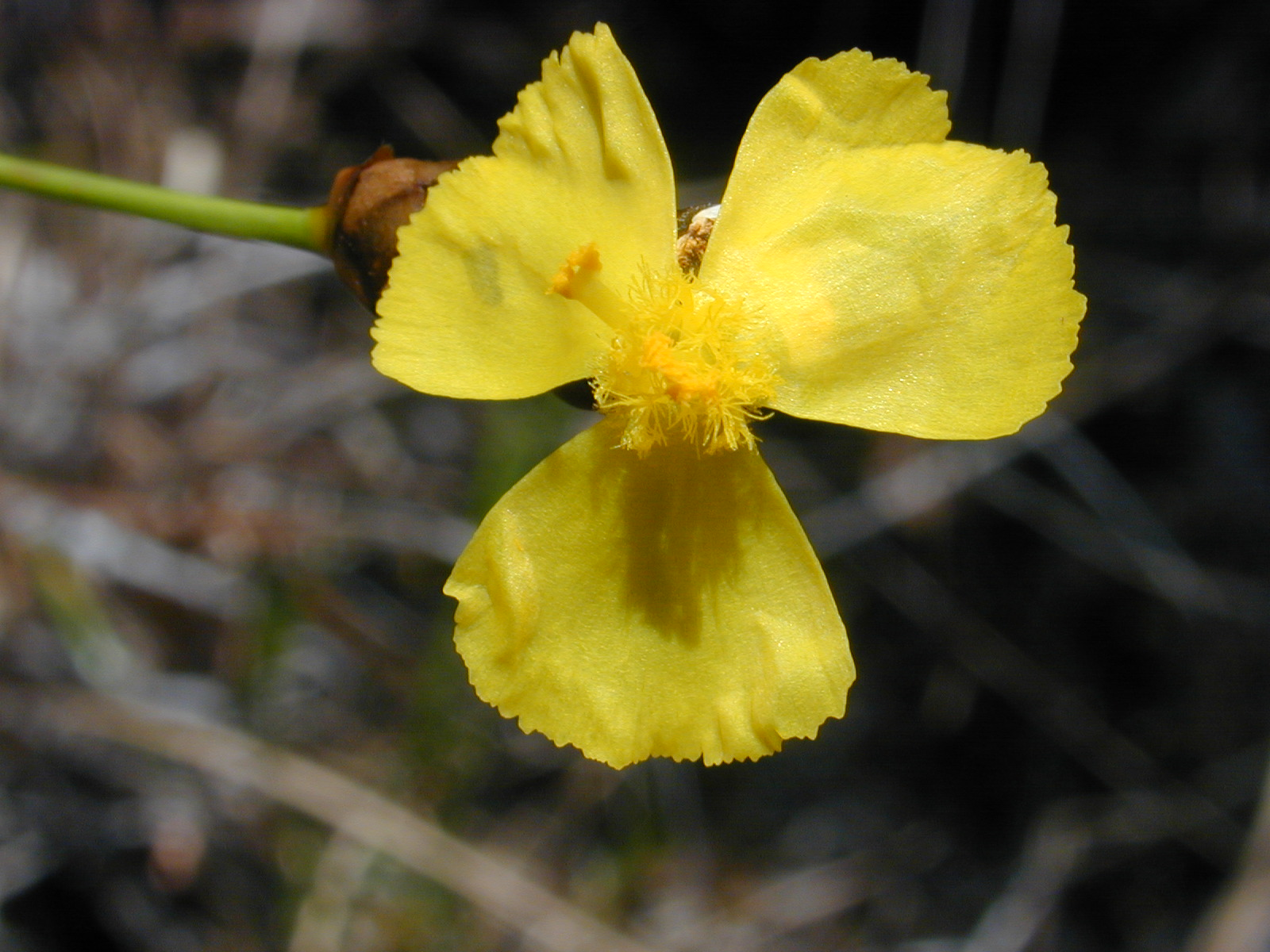
- Xyris complanata

Scientific classification
- Kingdom: Plantae
- Clade: Tracheophytes
- Clade: Angiosperms
- Clade: Monocots
- Clade: Commelinids
- Order: Poales
- Family: Xyridaceae
- Genus: Xyris; L.

Synonyms
- Xuris Raf. orth. var.

= Xyris =

Genus of yelloweyed grasses

Xyris is a genus of flowering plants, the yelloweyed grasses, in the yellow-eyed-grass family. The genus counts over 250 species, widespread over much of the world, with the center of distribution in the Guianas.

The leaves are mostly distichous, linear, flat, and thin or round with a conspicuous sheath at the base. They are arranged in a basal aggregation. The small, yellow flowers are borne on a spherical or cylindrical spike or head (inflorescence). Each flower grows from the axil of a leathery bract. The fruit is a nonfleshy, dehiscent capsule. In Xyris complanata, a single flower bud on the spike appears in the morning, and expands into a conspicuous flower during the afternoon hours.

The APG IV system, of 2016, places the genus in family Xyridaceae, into the order Poales in the clade commelinids, in the monocots.

Species include:

- Xyris ambigua Beyrich ex Kunth
- Xyris andina Malme
- Xyris arenicola
- Xyris asperula
- Xyris baldwiniana Schultes
- Xyris bayardii
- Xyris brevifolia Michaux
- Xyris bulbosa
- Xyris caroliniana Walter
- Xyris chapmanii
- Xyris communis
- Xyris complanata R.Br.
- Xyris decipiens N.E.Br.
- Xyris difformis Chapman
- Xyris drummondii Malme
- Xyris elliottii Chapman
- Xyris elongata Rudge
- Xyris exilis Doust & B.J.Conn
- Xyris fimbriata Elliott
- Xyris flabelliformis Chapman
- Xyris flexifolia R.Br.
- Xyris flexuosa
- Xyris floridana
- Xyris gracilis R.Br.
- Xyris gracillima F.Muell.
- Xyris inaequalis N.A.Wakef.
- Xyris indica L.
- Xyris indivisa N.A.Wakef.
- Xyris iridifolia
- Xyris isoetifolia Kral,
- Xyris jupicai Richard
- Xyris juncea R.Br.
- Xyris lacera R.Br.
- Xyris lanata R.Br.
- Xyris laxiflora F.Muell.
- Xyris laxifolia Martius
- Xyris longisepala Kral
- Xyris louisianica
- Xyris macrocephala
- Xyris marginata Rendle
- Xyris montana Ries
- Xyris muelleri Malme
- Xyris neglecta
- Xyris operculata Labill.
- Xyris pallescens
- Xyris panacea
- Xyris papillosa
- Xyris paradisiaca
- Xyris pauciflora Willd.
- Xyris platylepis Chapman
- Xyris roycei N.A.Wakef.
- Xyris scabrifolia R. M. Harper
- Xyris serotina Chapman
- Xyris smalliana Nash
- Xyris stricta Chapman
- Xyris subalata
- Xyris tennesseensis Kral
- Xyris torta Smith
- Xyris ustulata L.A.Nilsson

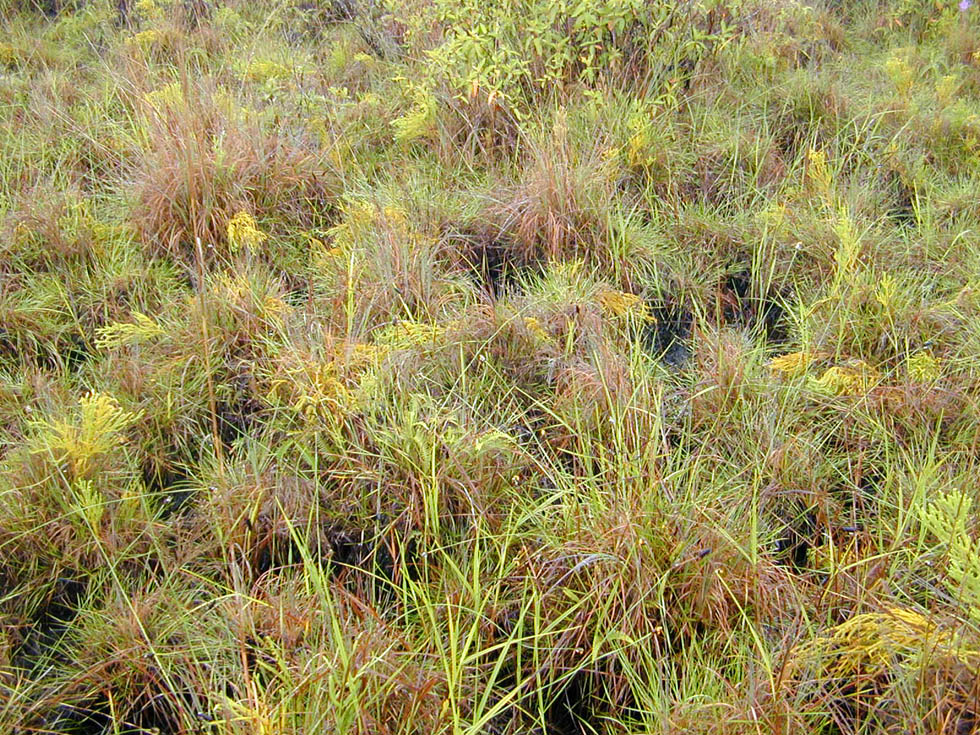
Stand of mostly Xyris complanata in a small wetland
