= Aratitiyopea =

Scientific classification
- Kingdom: Plantae
- Clade: Embryophytes
- Clade: Tracheophytes
- Clade: Spermatophytes
- Clade: Angiosperms
- Clade: Monocots
- Clade: Commelinids
- Order: Poales
- Family: Xyridaceae
- Genus: Aratitiyopea; Steyerm. & P.E.Berry
- Species: A. lopezii

Binomial name
- Aratitiyopea lopezii (L.B.Sm.) Steyerm. & P.E.Berry

Synonyms
- Navia lopezii L.B.Sm.

Genus of flowering plants

Aratitiyopea is a monotypic genus of flowering plants, in the family Xyridaceae containing the single species Aratitiyopea lopezii. The genus was erected and described in 1984. This species is native to northern South America (Venezuela, Colombia, Peru, and northwestern Brazil).

There are two varieties of this species:

- Aratitiyopea lopezii var. colombiana (L.B.Sm.) Steyerm. & P.E.Berry - Colombia
- Aratitiyopea lopezii var. lopezii - Venezuela, Peru, northwestern Brazil
