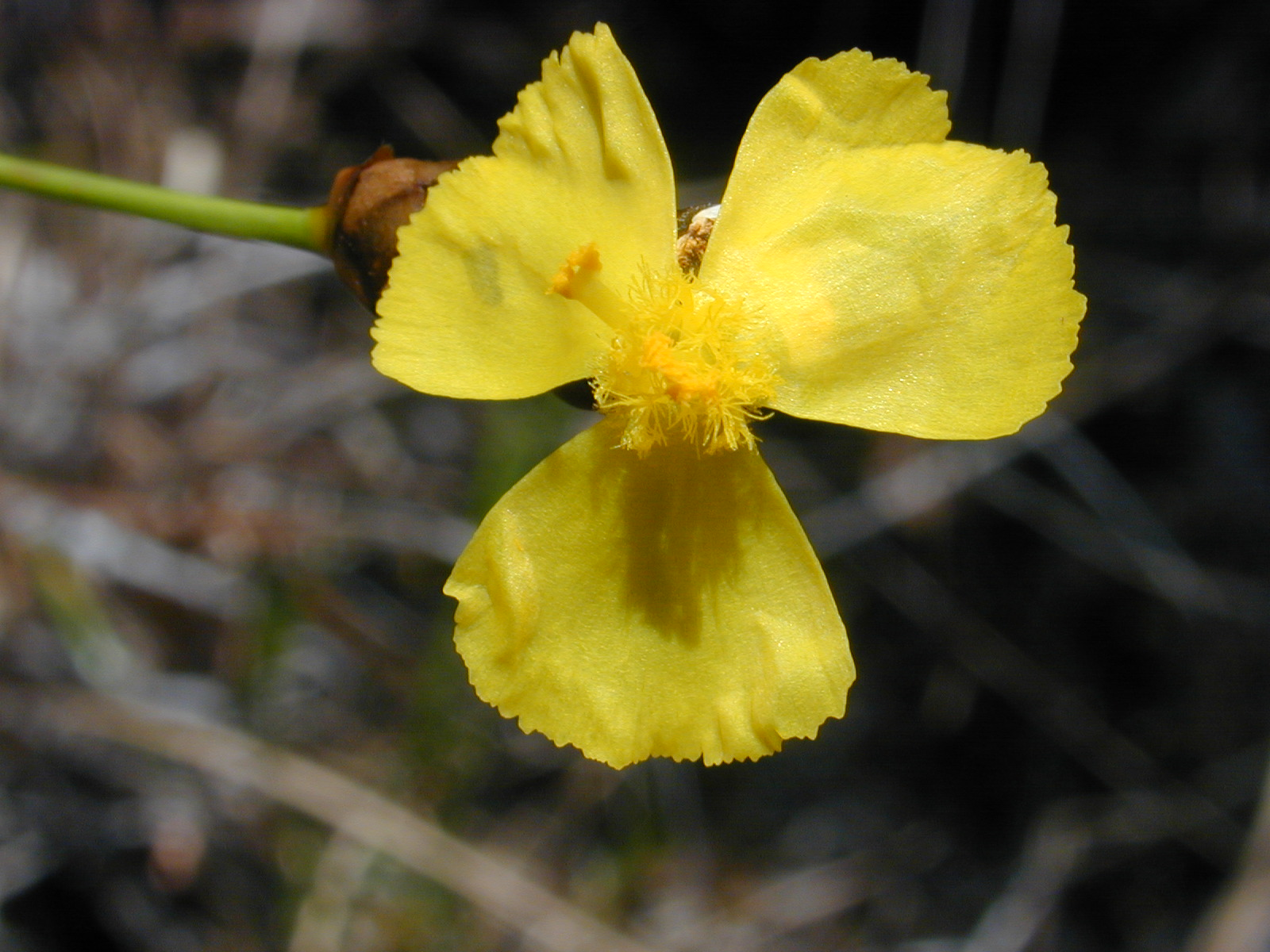

Conservation status
- Least Concern (IUCN 3.1)

Scientific classification
- Kingdom: Plantae
- Clade: Tracheophytes
- Clade: Angiosperms
- Clade: Monocots
- Clade: Commelinids
- Order: Poales
- Family: Xyridaceae
- Genus: Xyris
- Species: X. complanata

Binomial name
- Xyris complanata R.Br.

Synonyms
- Xyris anceps Vahl 1805 not Lam. 1791; Xyris laevis R.Br.; Xyris scabra R.Br.; Xyris elongata Rudge; Xyris walkeri Wight ex Kunth; Xyris malaccensis Steud.

= Xyris complanata =

Feathered yellow-eye

Species of yelloweyed grass

Xyris complanata, known as the feathered yellow-eye is a tufted herb in the Xyridaceae family. It is native to southern China, India, Sri Lanka, Thailand, Cambodia, Laos, Vietnam, Malaysia, Indonesia (Java, Sulawesi, Kalimantan, Sumatra), the Philippines, New Guinea and Australia (New South Wales, Queensland, Northern Territory and Western Australia). It is also naturalized in Hawaii where it is known as Hawai'i yelloweyed grass. In New South Wales it grows in moist areas, often near swamps or in heathland.

The specific epithet complanata refers to the flattened leaf stalk. This species first appeared in scientific literature in the year 1810.
