= Achatinella abbreviata =

- A live Achatinella abbreviata in 2008

Conservation status
- Extinct (IUCN 2.3)

- Presumed Extinct (NatureServe)
- CITES Appendix I

Scientific classification
- Kingdom: Animalia
- Phylum: Mollusca
- Class: Gastropoda
- Order: Stylommatophora
- Family: Achatinellidae
- Genus: Achatinella
- Subgenus: Bulimella
- Species: †A. abbreviata

Binomial name
- †Achatinella abbreviata Reeve, 1850
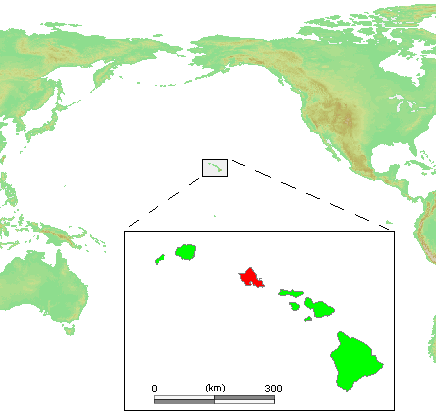
- Location of Oʻahu

Synonyms
- Achatinella bacca Reeve; Achatinella nivosa Newcomb; Achatinella clementina Pfeiffer

Extinct species of land snail

Achatinella abbreviata, an Oʻahu tree snail, is an extinct species of colorful tropical tree-living air-breathing land snail, an arboreal pulmonate gastropod mollusk in the genus Achatinella.

== Shell description ==
The dextral shell is ovate and somewhat ventricose with convex whorls margined round the upper shell. The shell has six whorls. The spire is rather short and obtuse at the apex. The columella is callous and twisted. Olive-yellow, with a black-brown line at the sutures; the lower part of the last whorl is very dark green and the apex is black.

The height of the shell is 19.0 mm. The width of the shell is 10.0 mm.

== Distribution ==
This species was endemic to the Hawaiʻian island of Oʻahu.

== Conservation status ==
This species is considered to be extinct. The IUCN Red List first listed it extinct in 1990. A single live snail was found in 2008. However when the site was returned to a Euglandina rosea snail had arrived and the A. abbreviata snail could not be located. This was the last sighting of A . abbreviata, and it is almost certainly extinct.
