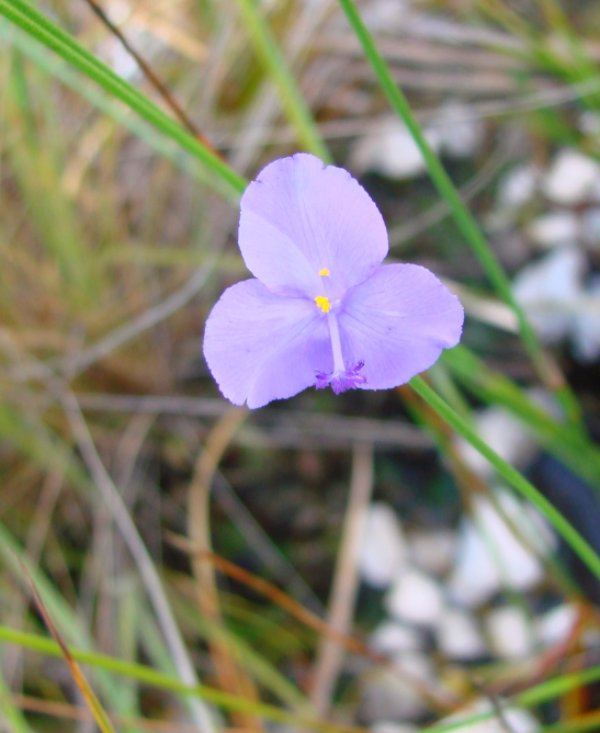
- Abolboda pulchella

Scientific classification
- Kingdom: Plantae
- Clade: Tracheophytes
- Clade: Angiosperms
- Clade: Monocots
- Clade: Commelinids
- Order: Poales
- Family: Xyridaceae
- Genus: Abolboda; Humb. & Bonpl.

Synonyms
- Chloerum Willd. ex Spreng.; Jupica Raf.; Poarchon Mart. ex Seub. 1855 not Allemão 1846

= Abolboda =

Genus of flowering plants

Abolboda is a genus of flowering plants, traditionally and nowadays (Kubitzki system and APG IV) assigned to family Xyridaceae. It is native to tropical South America and to the island of Trinidad, generally on marshy savanna.

Species

- Abolboda abbreviata Malme - Pará in Brazil
- Abolboda acaulis Maguire - Venezuela, Guyana
- Abolboda acicularis Idrobo & L.B.Sm. - Venezuela, Colombia
- Abolboda americana (Aubl.) Lanj. - Trinidad & Tobago, Colombia, Venezuela, the Guianas, northern Brazil
- Abolboda bella Maguire - Cerro Yapacana in Venezuela
- Abolboda ciliata Maguire & Wurdack - Sierra de la Neblina in Venezuela
- Abolboda dunstervillei Maguire ex Kral - Cerro Avispa in Venezuela
- Abolboda ebracteata Maguire & Wurdack - Venezuela, Colombia
- Abolboda egleri L.B.Sm. & Downs - Venezuela, Colombia, Pará
- Abolboda × glomerata Maguire - Venezuela (A. linearifolia × A. macrostachya)
- Abolboda grandis Griseb. - Venezuela, Colombia, Guyana, Suriname, northwestern Brazil
- Abolboda granularis (Maguire) L.M.Campb. & Kral - Venezuela, Colombia
- Abolboda killipii Lasser - Venezuela, Guyana, Suriname, northwestern Brazil
- Abolboda linearifolia Maguire - State of Amazonas in southern Venezuela
- Abolboda macrostachya Spruce ex Malme - Venezuela, Guyana, Suriname, Brazil
- Abolboda neblinae Maguire - Sierra de la Neblina in Venezuela, northwestern Brazil
- Abolboda paniculata Maguire - Venezuela, northwestern Brazil
- Abolboda poarchon Seub. - Brazil, Paraguay
- Abolboda pulchella Humb. & Bonpl. - Venezuela, Colombia, the Guianas, Brazil
- Abolboda scabrida Kral - Cerro Aracamuni in Venezuela
- Abolboda sprucei Malme - Colombia, State of Amazonas in southern Venezuela
- Abolboda uniflora Maguire - Cerro Duida in Venezuela

Formerly included

- Abolboda ptaritepuiana Steyerm. (synonym of Orectanthe ptaritepuiana)
- Abolboda sceptrum Oliv. (synonym of Orectanthe sceptrum)
