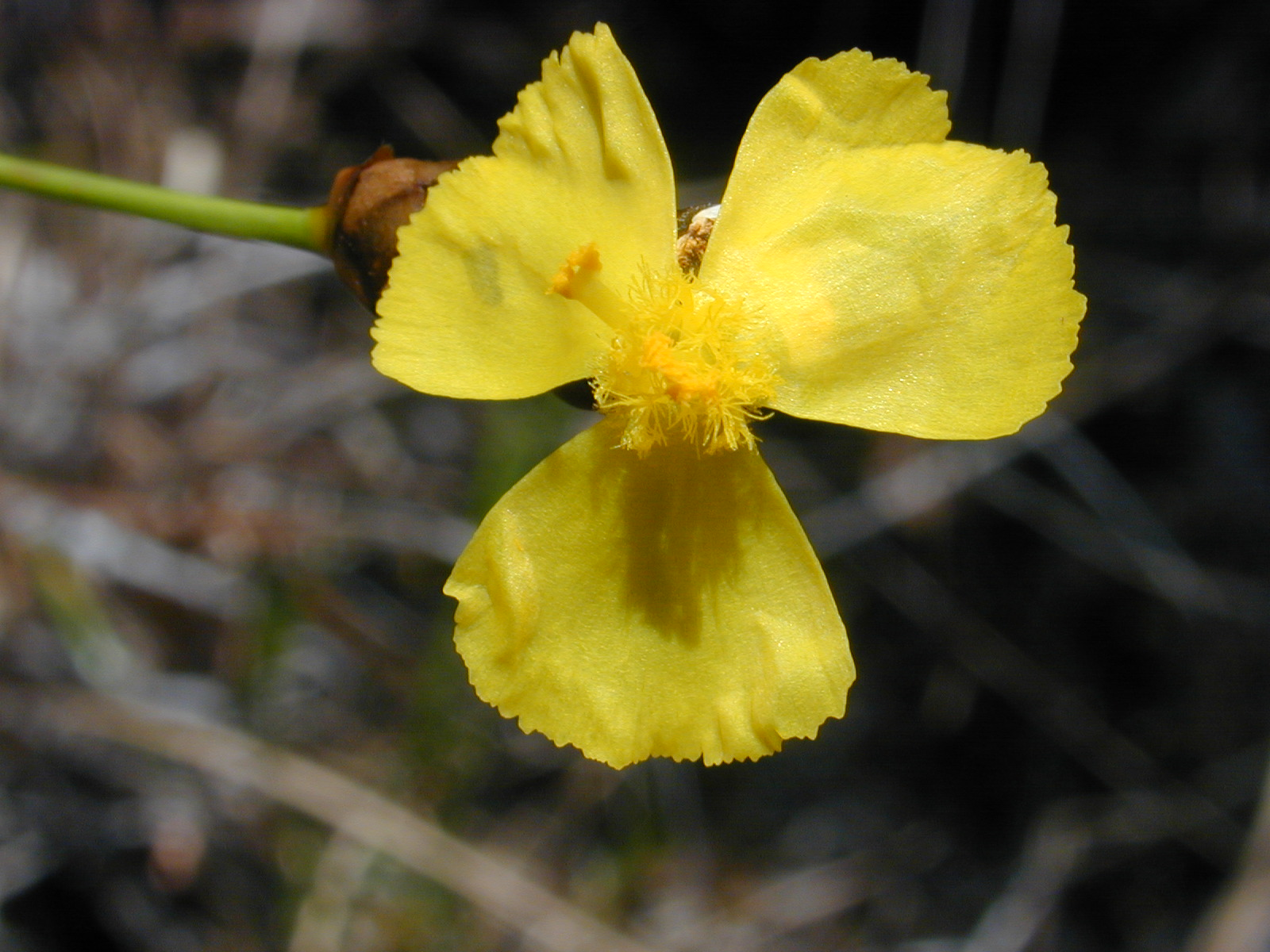
- Xyris complanata flower close-up

Scientific classification
- Kingdom: Plantae
- Clade: Tracheophytes
- Clade: Angiosperms
- Clade: Monocots
- Clade: Commelinids
- Order: Poales
- Family: Xyridaceae; C.Agardh

Genera
- Abolboda; Achlyphila; Aratitiyopea; Orectanthe; Xyris

Synonyms
- Xyrideae

= Xyridaceae =

Family of flowering plants

The Xyridaceae are a family of flowering plants. This family has been recognized by many taxonomists and is known as the yellow-eyed grass family.

The APG II system, of 2003 (unchanged from the APG system of 1998), also recognizes this family, and assigns it to the order Poales in the clade commelinids, in the monocots. This treatment in APG II represents a slight change from the APG system of 1998, which had recognized the family Abolbodaceae for some of the plants included here; that family was unplaced as to order, but was assigned to this same clade (although APG used the spelling "commelinoids").

The family contains almost 400 species in five genera, but most of the species are found in the genus Xyris (see also Abolboda). The species are mostly tropical and subtropical.

The Cronquist system of 1981 also recognized such a family and placed it in the order Commelinales in the subclass Commelinidae in class Liliopsida in division Magnoliophyta.

The Wettstein system, last updated in 1935, placed the family in order Enantioblastae.

Xyris torta, twisted yellow-eyed grass, is on Minnesota's endangered species list.

In 2021 it was discovered that Fusarium xyrophilum was able to hijack a South American species of yellow-eyed Xyris grass, creating fake flowers, fooling bees and other pollinating insects into visiting them, taking fungal spores to other plants.

- Xyridaceae
  - Xyris
  - Achlyphila
  - - Abolboda
    - - Orectanthe
      - Aratitiyopea
