= List of pteridophytes of South Africa =

Spore-bearing vascular plants recorded from South Africa

This listing contains taxa of plants in the division Pteridophyta, recorded from South Africa. A pteridophyte is a vascular plant (with xylem and phloem) that disperses spores. Because pteridophytes produce neither flowers nor seeds, they are sometimes referred to as "cryptogams", meaning that their means of reproduction is hidden. Ferns, horsetails (often treated as ferns), and lycophytes (clubmosses, spikemosses, and quillworts) are all pteridophytes. However, they do not form a monophyletic group because ferns (and horsetails) are more closely related to seed plants than to lycophytes. "Pteridophyta" is thus no longer a widely accepted taxon, but the term pteridophyte remains in common parlance, as do pteridology and pteridologist as a science and its practitioner, respectively. Ferns and lycophytes share a life cycle and are often collectively treated or studied, for example by the International Association of Pteridologists and the Pteridophyte Phylogeny Group.

23,420 species of vascular plant have been recorded in South Africa, making it the sixth most species-rich country in the world and the most species-rich country on the African continent. Of these, 153 species are considered to be threatened. Nine biomes have been described in South Africa: Fynbos, Succulent Karoo, desert, Nama Karoo, grassland, savanna, Albany thickets, the Indian Ocean coastal belt, and forests.

The 2018 National Biodiversity Assessment plant checklist lists 35,130 taxa in the phyla Anthocerotophyta (hornworts (6)), Anthophyta (flowering plants(33534)), Bryophyta (mosses (685)), Cycadophyta (cycads (42)), Lycopodiophyta (Lycophytes(45)), Marchantiophyta (liverworts (376)), Pinophyta (conifers (33)), and Pteridophyta {cryptograms(408)).

== Listing ==
- Abrodictyum pseudorigidum Bauret & Dubuisson, indigenous
- Acrostichum aureum L. indigenous
- Actiniopteris dimorpha Pic.Serm. indigenous
- Actiniopteris dimorpha Pic.Serm. subsp. dimorpha indigenous
- Actiniopteris radiata (J.Konig ex Sw.) Link, indigenous
- Adiantum aethiopicum L. indigenous
- Adiantum capillus-veneris L. indigenous
- Adiantum hispidulum Sw. indigenous
- Adiantum hispidulum Sw. var. hispidulum indigenous
- Adiantum incisum Forssk. indigenous
- Adiantum lunulatum Burm.f. indigenous
- Adiantum poiretii Wikstr. indigenous
- Adiantum raddianum C.Presl
- Alsophila capensis (L.f.) J.Sm. indigenous
- Alsophila dregei (Kunze) R.M.Tryon, indigenous
- Amauropelta bergiana (Schltdl.) Holttum, indigenous
- Amauropelta bergiana (Schltdl.) Holttum var. bergiana, indigenous
- Amauropelta knysnaensis (N.C.Anthony & Schelpe) Parris, endemic
- Amauropelta oppositiformis (C.Chr.) Holttum, indigenous
- Ampelopteris prolifera (Retz.) Copel. indigenous
- Anemia dregeana Kunze, indigenous
- Anemia simii Tardieu, indigenous
- Anogramma leptophylla (L.) Link, indigenous
- Arachniodes foliosa (C.Chr.) Schelpe
- Arachniodes webbiana (A.Braun) Schelpe, indigenous
- Arachniodes webbiana (A.Braun) Schelpe subsp. foliosa (C.Chr.) Gibby, Rasbach, Reichst., Widen & Via, indigenous
- Arthropteris monocarpa (Cordem.) C.Chr. indigenous
- Aspidium athamanticum Kunze, indigenous
- Aspidium falcatum (L.f.) Sw.
- Aspidium inaequale Schltdl. indigenous
- Aspidium inaequale Schltdl. var. montanum Kunze, indigenous
- Aspidium pentagonum (T.Moore) Kuhn, indigenous
- Aspidium squamisetum (Hook.) Kuhn, indigenous
- Asplenium adiantum-nigrum L. indigenous
- Asplenium adiantum-nigrum L. var. adiantum-nigrum indigenous
- Asplenium adiantum-nigrum L. var. solidum (Kunze) J.P.Roux, endemic
- Asplenium aethiopicum (Burm.f.) Bech. indigenous
- Asplenium aethiopicum (Burm.f.) Bech. subsp. dodecaploideum A.F.Braithw. indigenous
- Asplenium aethiopicum (Burm.f.) Bech. subsp. filare (Forssk.) A.F.Braithw. indigenous
- Asplenium aethiopicum (Burm.f.) Bech. subsp. tripinnatum (Baker) A.F.Braithw. indigenous
- Asplenium anisophyllum Kunze, indigenous
- Asplenium blastophorum Hieron. indigenous
- Asplenium boltonii Hook. ex Brause & Hieron. indigenous
- Asplenium capense (Kunze) Bir, Fraser-Jenk. & Lovis, indigenous
- Asplenium christii Hieron. indigenous
- Asplenium cordatum (Thunb.) Sw. indigenous
- Asplenium dregeanum Kunze indigenous
- Asplenium erectum Bory ex Willd. indigenous
- Asplenium erectum Bory ex Willd. var. erectum, indigenous
- Asplenium erectum Bory ex Willd. var. usambarense (Hieron.) Schelpe, indigenous
- Asplenium friesiorum C.Chr. indigenous
- Asplenium gemmiferum Schrad. indigenous
- Asplenium hypomelas Kuhn, indigenous
- Asplenium inaequilaterale Bory ex Willd. indigenous
- Asplenium lividum Mett. ex Kuhn, indigenous
- Asplenium lobatum Pappe & Rawson, indigenous
- Asplenium lobatum Pappe & Rawson var. lobatum, indigenous
- Asplenium lobatum Pappe & Rawson var. pseudo-abyssinicum N.C.Anthony & Schelpe, indigenous
- Asplenium lunulatum Sw. indigenous
- Asplenium monanthes L. indigenous
- Asplenium multiforme Krasser, indigenous
- Asplenium obscurum Blume, indigenous
- Asplenium phillipsianum (Kummerle) Bir, Fraser-Jenk. & Lovis, indigenous
- Asplenium platyneuron (L.) Britten, Sterns & Poggenb. indigenous
- Asplenium preussii Hieron. ex Brause, indigenous
- Asplenium prionitis Kunze, indigenous
- Asplenium protensum Schrad. indigenous
- Asplenium rutifolium (P.J.Bergius) Kunze, indigenous
- Asplenium sandersonii Hook. indigenous
- Asplenium schelpei A.F.Braithw. indigenous
- Asplenium simii A.F.Braithw. & Schelpe, indigenous
- Asplenium splendens Kunze, indigenous
- Asplenium splendens Kunze subsp. drakensbergense A.F.Braithw. near endemic
- Asplenium splendens Kunze subsp. splendens, indigenous
- Asplenium stoloniferum Bory, indigenous
- Asplenium theciferum (Humb., Bonpl. & Kunth) Mett. indigenous
- Asplenium theciferum (Humb., Bonpl. & Kunth) Mett. var. concinnum (Schrad.) Schelpe, indigenous
- Asplenium trichomanes L. indigenous
- Asplenium trichomanes L. subsp. quadrivalens D.E.Mey. indigenous
- Asplenium varians Wall. ex Hook. & Grev. indigenous
- Asplenium varians Wall. ex Hook. & Grev. subsp. fimbriatum (Kunze) Schelpe, indigenous
- Asplenium x flexuosum Schrad. indigenous
- Athyrium crassicaule J.P.Roux, near endemic
- Athyrium newtonii Baker, indigenous
- Athyrium schimperi Moug. ex Fee, indigenous
- Azolla cristata Kaulf. invasive
- Azolla filiculoides Lam. invasive
- Azolla microphylla Kaulf.
- Azolla pinnata R.Br. indigenous
- Azolla pinnata R.Br. subsp. africana (Desv.) R.M.K.Saunders & K.Fowler, indigenous
- Azolla pinnata R.Br. subsp. asiatica R.M.K.Saunders & K.Fowler, invasive
- Blechnum attenuatum (Sw.) Mett. indigenous
- Blechnum attenuatum (Sw.) Mett. var. giganteum (Kaulf.) Bonap.
- Blechnum australe L. indigenous
- Blechnum australe L. subsp. australe, indigenous
- Blechnum capense Burm.f. indigenous
- Blechnum inflexum (Kunze) Kuhn, indigenous
- Blechnum punctulatum Sw. indigenous
- Blechnum punctulatum Sw. var. atherstonei (Pappe & Rawson) Sim, indigenous
- Blechnum punctulatum Sw. var. intermedium (Sim) Sim, endemic
- Blechnum punctulatum Sw. var. krebsii (Kunze) Sim, endemic
- Blechnum punctulatum Sw. var. punctulatum, indigenous
- Blechnum tabulare (Thunb.) Kuhn, indigenous
- Blotiella glabra (Bory) R.M.Tryon, indigenous
- Blotiella natalensis (Hook.) R.M.Tryon, indigenous
- Bolbitis heudelotii (Bory ex Fee) Alston, indigenous
- Cephalomanes rigidum (Sw.) K.Iwats. indigenous
- Ceratopteris thalictroides (L.) Brongn. indigenous
- Ceterach cordatum (Thunb.) Desv. indigenous
- Cheilanthes bergiana Schltdl. indigenous
- Cheilanthes botswanae Schelpe & N.C.Anthony, indigenous
- Cheilanthes buchananii (Baker) Domin, indigenous
- Cheilanthes capensis (Thunb.) Sw. indigenous
- Cheilanthes ceterachoides A.W.Klopper & Klopper, endemic
- Cheilanthes contracta (Kunze) Mett. ex Kuhn, endemic
- Cheilanthes deltoidea Kunze, indigenous
- Cheilanthes deltoidea Kunze subsp. deltoidea, indigenous
- Cheilanthes deltoidea Kunze subsp. silicicola Klopper & A.E.van Wyk, endemic
- Cheilanthes depauperata Baker, endemic
- Cheilanthes dolomiticola (Schelpe) Schelpe & N.C.Anthony, indigenous
- Cheilanthes eckloniana (Kunze) Mett. indigenous
- Cheilanthes hastata (L.f.) Kunze, indigenous
- Cheilanthes hirta Sw. indigenous
- Cheilanthes hirta Sw. var. brevipilosa W.Jacobsen & N.Jacobsen forma brevipilosa, indigenous
- Cheilanthes hirta Sw. var. brevipilosa W.Jacobsen & N.Jacobsen forma laxa, indigenous
- Cheilanthes hirta Sw. var. brevipilosa W.Jacobsen & N.Jacobsen forma waterbergensis, endemic
- Cheilanthes hirta Sw. var. hirta, indigenous
- Cheilanthes hirta Sw. var. hyaloglandulosa (W.Jacobsen & N.Jacobsen) J.E.Burrows, indigenous
- Cheilanthes hirta Sw. var. inferacampestris W.Jacobsen & N.Jacobsen, indigenous
- Cheilanthes hirta Sw. var. nemorosa W.Jacobsen & N.Jacobsen, indigenous
- Cheilanthes hyaloglandulosa W.Jacobsen & N.Jacobsen, indigenous
- Cheilanthes inaequalis (Kunze) Mett. indigenous
- Cheilanthes inaequalis (Kunze) Mett. var. buchananii (Baker) Schelpe, indigenous
- Cheilanthes induta Kunze, endemic
- Cheilanthes involuta (Sw.) Schelpe & N.C.Anthony, indigenous
- Cheilanthes involuta (Sw.) Schelpe & N.C.Anthony var. involuta, indigenous
- Cheilanthes involuta (Sw.) Schelpe & N.C.Anthony var. obscura (N.C.Anthony) N.C.Anthony, indigenous
- Cheilanthes kunzei Mett. indigenous
- Cheilanthes marlothii (Hieron.) Domin, indigenous
- Cheilanthes multifida (Sw.) Sw. indigenous
- Cheilanthes multifida (Sw.) Sw. subsp. lacerata N.C.Anthony & Schelpe, indigenous
- Cheilanthes multifida (Sw.) Sw. var. multifida, indigenous
- Cheilanthes namaquensis (Baker) Schelpe & N.C.Anthony, indigenous
- Cheilanthes nielsii W.Jacobsen, indigenous
- Cheilanthes parviloba (Sw.) Sw. indigenous
- Cheilanthes pentagona Schelpe & N.C.Anthony, indigenous
- Cheilanthes quadripinnata (Forssk.) Kuhn, indigenous
- Cheilanthes rawsonii (Pappe) Mett. ex Kuhn, indigenous
- Cheilanthes robusta (Kunze) R.M.Tryon, indigenous
- Cheilanthes viridis (Forssk.) Sw. indigenous
- Cheilanthes viridis (Forssk.) Sw. var. glauca (Sim) Schelpe & N.C.Anthony, indigenous
- Cheilanthes viridis (Forssk.) Sw. var. macrophylla (Kunze) Schelpe & N.C.Anthony, indigenous
- Cheilanthes viridis (Forssk.) Sw. var. viridis, indigenous
- Christella altissima Holttum, endemic
- Christella buchananii (Schelpe) J.P.Roux, indigenous
- Christella chaseana (Schelpe) Holttum, indigenous
- Christella dentata (Forssk.) Brownsey & Jermy, indigenous
- Christella gueinziana (Mett.) Holttum, indigenous
- Christella hispidula (Decne.) Holttum, indigenous
- Crepidomanes borbonicum (Bosch) J.P.Roux, indigenous
- Crepidomanes inopinatum (Pic.Serm.) J.P.Roux, indigenous
- Crepidomanes melanotrichum (Schltdl.) J.P.Roux, indigenous
- Ctenitis lanuginosa (Willd. ex Kaulf.) Copel. indigenous
- Cyathea capensis (L.f.) Sm. indigenous
- Cyathea cooperi (Hook. ex F.Muell.) Domin.
- Cyathea dregei Kunze, indigenous
- Cyclosorus guenzianus (Mett.) J.P.Roux, indigenous
- Cyclosorus interruptus (Willd.) H.Ito, indigenous
- Cyrtomium falcatum (L.f.) C.Presl
- Cyrtomium luctuosum J.P.Roux, indigenous
- Cyrtomium pseudocaryotideum J.P.Roux, endemic
- Cystopteris fragilis (L.) Bernh. indigenous
- Cystopteris fragilis (L.) Bernh. subsp. fragilis, indigenous
- Davallia chaerophylloides (Poir.) Steud. indigenous
- Davallia denticulata (Burm.f.) Mett. ex Kuhn, indigenous
- Davallia denticulata (Burm.f.) Mett. ex Kuhn var. denticulata, indigenous
- Deparia japonica (Thunb.) M.Kato, invasive
- Dicksonia antarctica Labill. cultivated
- Dicranopteris linearis (Burm.f.) Underw. indigenous
- Dicranopteris linearis (Burm.f.) Underw. var. linearis, indigenous
- Didymochlaena truncatula (Sw.) J.Sm. indigenous
- Didymoglossum erosum (Willd.) Beentje, indigenous
- Didymoglossum reptans (Sw.) C.Presl, indigenous
- Diplazium esculentum (Retz.) Sw. invasive
- Diplazium zanzibaricum (Baker) C.Chr. indigenous
- Doodia caudata (Cav.) R.Br.
- Doryopteris concolor (Langsd. & Fisch.) Kuhn, indigenous
- Doryopteris pilosa (Poir.) Kuhn, indigenous
- Doryopteris pilosa (Poir.) Kuhn var. gemmifera J.E.Burrows & S.E.Strauss, indigenous
- Dryopteris antarctica (Baker) C.Chr. indigenous
- Dryopteris athamantica (Kunze) Kuntze, indigenous
- Dryopteris buchananii (Baker) Kuntze, indigenous
- Dryopteris callolepis C.Chr. indigenous
- Dryopteris dracomontana Schelpe & N.C.Anthony, indigenous
- Dryopteris esterhuyseniae Schelpe & N.C.Anthony, endemic
- Dryopteris falcata (L.f.) Kuntze
- Dryopteris inaequalis (Schltdl.) Kuntze, indigenous
- Dryopteris lewalleana Pic.Serm. indigenous
- Dryopteris pentheri (Krasser) C.Chr. indigenous
- Dryopteris pentheri (Krasser) C.Chr. var. montana (Kunze) Alston, indigenous
- Dryopteris squamiseta (Hook.) Kuntze, indigenous
- Elaphoglossum acrostichoides (Hook. & Grev.) Schelpe, indigenous
- Elaphoglossum angustatum (Schrad.) Hieron. indigenous
- Elaphoglossum aubertii (Desv.) T.Moore, indigenous
- Elaphoglossum conforme (Sw.) J.Sm. indigenous
- Elaphoglossum drakensbergense Schelpe, near endemic
- Elaphoglossum hybridum (Bory) Brack. indigenous
- Elaphoglossum macropodium (Fee) T.Moore, indigenous
- Elaphoglossum petiolatum (Sw.) Urb. var. rupestre (Sim) Sim, indigenous
- Elaphoglossum spathulatum (Bory) T.Moore, indigenous
- Elaphoglossum spathulatum (Bory) T.Moore var. spathulatum, indigenous
- Equisetum hyemale L. invasive
- Equisetum ramosissimum Desf. indigenous
- Equisetum ramosissimum Desf. subsp. ramosissimum, indigenous
- Gleichenia polypodioides (L.) Sm. indigenous
- Gleichenia umbraculifera (Kunze) T.Moore, indigenous
- Grammitis poeppigiana (Mett.) Pic.Serm. indigenous
- Grammitis rigescens (Bory ex Willd.) Lellinger
- Histiopteris incisa (Thunb.) J.Sm. indigenous
- Hymenophyllum aeruginosum (Poir.) Carmich. indigenous
- Hymenophyllum capense Schrad. indigenous
- Hymenophyllum capillare Desv. indigenous
- Hymenophyllum capillare Desv. var. alternialatum (Pic.Serm.) Faden, indigenous
- Hymenophyllum marlothii Brause, indigenous
- Hymenophyllum peltatum (Poir.) Desv. indigenous
- Hymenophyllum tunbridgense (L.) Sm. indigenous
- Hypodematium crenatum (Forssk.) Kuhn, indigenous
- Hypolepis sparsisora (Schrad.) Kuhn, indigenous
- Hypolepis villosa-viscida (Thouars) Tardieu, indigenous
- Lastrea athamantica (Kunze) T.Moore, indigenous
- Lastrea buchananii (Baker) Bedd., indigenous
- Lastrea inaequalis (Schltdl.) C.Presl, indigenous
- Lastrea pentagona T.Moore, indigenous
- Lastrea plantii T.Moore, indigenous
- Lepisorus excavatus (Bory ex Willd.) Ching, indigenous
- Lepisorus schraderi (Mett.) Ching, indigenous
- Lindsaea ensifolia Sw. indigenous
- Loxogramme abyssinica (Baker) M.G.Price, indigenous
- Lunathyrium japonicum (Thunb.) Sa.Kurata,
- Lygodium japonicum (Thunb.) Sw.
- Lygodium kerstenii Kuhn, indigenous
- Lygodium microphyllum (Cav.) R.Br. indigenous
- Macrothelypteris torresiana (Gaudich.) Ching
- Marattia fraxinea Sm. indigenous
- Marattia fraxinea Sm. var. salicifolia (Schrad.) C.Chr. indigenous
- Marsilea aegyptiaca Willd. indigenous
- Marsilea apposita Launert, indigenous
- Marsilea burchellii (Kunze) A.Braun, indigenous
- Marsilea capensis A.Braun, indigenous
- Marsilea coromandelina Willd. indigenous
- Marsilea ephippiocarpa Alston, indigenous
- Marsilea farinosa Launert, indigenous
- Marsilea farinosa Launert subsp. arrecta J.E.Burrows, indigenous
- Marsilea farinosa Launert subsp. farinosa, indigenous
- Marsilea fenestrata Launert, indigenous
- Marsilea macrocarpa C.Presl, indigenous
- Marsilea minuta L. indigenous
- Marsilea minuta L. var. minuta, indigenous
- Marsilea mutica Mett.
- Marsilea nubica A.Braun, indigenous
- Marsilea schelpeana Launert, endemic
- Marsilea villifolia Bremek. & Oberm. ex Alston & Schelpe, indigenous
- Megalastrum lanuginosum (Willd. ex Kaulf.) Holttum, indigenous
- Melpomene flabelliformis (Poir.) A.R.Sm. & R.C.Moran, indigenous
- Microgramma mauritiana (Willd.) Tardieu, indigenous
- Microlepia speluncae (L.) T.Moore, indigenous
- Microsorum ensiforme (Thunb.) Schelpe, indigenous
- Microsorum pappei (Mett. ex Kuhn) Tardieu, indigenous
- Microsorum punctatum (L.) Copel. indigenous
- Microsorum scandens (G.Forst.) Tindale
- Microsorum scolopendria (Burm.f.) Copel. indigenous
- Mohria caffrorum (L.) Desv. endemic
- Mohria caffrorum (L.) Desv. var. ferruginea J.E.Burrows & S.M.Burrows
- Mohria hirsuta J.P.Roux
- Mohria marginalis (Savigny) J.P.Roux, indigenous
- Mohria nudiuscula J.P.Roux, indigenous
- Mohria rigida J.P.Roux, indigenous
- Mohria saxatilis J.P.Roux, endemic
- Mohria vestita Baker, indigenous
- Nephrodium antarcticum Baker, indigenous
- Nephrodium athamanticum (Kunze) Hook. indigenous
- Nephrodium buchananii Baker, indigenous
- Nephrodium inaequale (Schltdl.) Hook. indigenous
- Nephrodium squamisetum Hook. indigenous
- Nephrolepis biserrata (Sw.) Schott indigenous
- Nephrolepis cordifolia (L.) C.Presl
- Nephrolepis cordifolia (L.) C.Presl var. cordifolia indigenous
- Nothoperanema squamiseta (Hook.) Ching indigenous
- Oleandra distenta Kunze, indigenous
- Ophioglossum bergianum Schltdl. endemic
- Ophioglossum caroticaule J.E.Burrows, indigenous
- Ophioglossum convexum J.E.Burrows, indigenous
- Ophioglossum costatum R.Br. indigenous
- Ophioglossum gomezianum Welw. ex A.Braun, indigenous
- Ophioglossum gracile Pocock ex J.E.Burrows, endemic
- Ophioglossum gracillimum Welw. ex Hook. & Baker, indigenous
- Ophioglossum lusoafricanum Welw. ex Prantl, indigenous
- Ophioglossum nudicaule L.f. endemic
- Ophioglossum polyphyllum A.Braun, indigenous
- Ophioglossum polyphyllum A.Braun var. angustifolium Pocock ex J.E.Burrows, indigenous
- Ophioglossum polyphyllum A.Braun var. polyphyllum, indigenous
- Ophioglossum reticulatum L. indigenous
- Ophioglossum rubellum Welw. ex A.Braun, indigenous
- Ophioglossum vulgatum L. indigenous
- Ophioglossum vulgatum L. subsp. africanum Pocock ex J.E.Burrows var. africanum, indigenous
- Ophioglossum vulgatum L. subsp. kilimandscharicum (Hieron.) J.E.Burrows, indigenous
- Osmunda regalis L. indigenous
- Pellaea boivinii Hook. indigenous
- Pellaea boivinii Hook. var. boivinii, indigenous
- Pellaea calomelanos (Sw.) Link, indigenous
- Pellaea calomelanos (Sw.) Link var. calomelanos, indigenous
- Pellaea calomelanos (Sw.) Link var. leucomelas (Mett. ex Kuhn) J.E.Burrows, indigenous
- Pellaea dura (Willd.) Hook. indigenous
- Pellaea dura (Willd.) Hook. var. dura, indigenous
- Pellaea leucomelas (Mett. ex Kuhn) Baker, endemic
- Pellaea pectiniformis Baker, indigenous
- Pellaea pteroides (L.) Prantl, endemic
- Pellaea rufa A.F.Tryon, endemic
- Phanerophlebia falcata (L.f.) Copel. indigenous
- Phlebodium aureum (L.) J.Sm.
- Phymatosorus ensiformis (Thunb.) Pic.Serm.
- Phymatosorus scandens (G.Forst.) Pic.Serm.
- Phymatosorus scolopendria (Burm.f.) Pic.Serm.
- Pilularia bokkeveldensis N.R.Crouch, endemic
- Pilularia dracomontana N.R.Crouch & J.Wesley-Smith, endemic
- Pityrogramma argentea (Willd.) Domin, indigenous
- Pityrogramma calomelanos (L.) Link var. aureoflava (Hook.) Weath. ex Bailey,
- Platycerium bifurcatum (Cav.) C.Chr. cultivated, invasive
- Pleopeltis bampsii Pic.Serm.
- Pleopeltis excavata (Bory ex Willd.) Sledge
- Pleopeltis macrocarpa (Bory ex Willd.) Kaulf. indigenous
- Pleopeltis polypodioides (L.) E.G.Andrews & Windham subsp. ecklonii (Kunze) J.P.Roux, indigenous
- Pleopeltis schraderi (Mett.) Tardieu, indigenous
- Pleopeltis x simiana (Schelpe & N.C.Anthony) N.R.Crouch & Klopper subsp. simiana, indigenous
- Pneumatopteris unita (Kunze) Holttum, indigenous
- Polyphlebium borbonicum (Bosch) Ebihara & Dubuisson, indigenous
- Polypodium aureum L. invasive
- Polypodium ensiforme Thunb. endemic
- Polypodium falcatum L.f.
- Polypodium polypodioides (L.) Watt subsp. ecklonii (Kunze) Schelpe, indigenous
- Polypodium vulgare L. indigenous
- Polystichum alticola Schelpe & N.C.Anthony, indigenous
- Polystichum dracomontanum Schelpe & N.C.Anthony, near endemic
- Polystichum falcatum (L.f.) Diels
- Polystichum inaequale (Schltdl.) Keyserl. indigenous
- Polystichum incongruum J.P.Roux, endemic
- Polystichum luctuosum (Kunze) T.Moore, indigenous
- Polystichum macleae (Baker) Diels, indigenous
- Polystichum monticola N.C.Anthony & Schelpe, indigenous
- Polystichum pungens (Kaulf.) C.Presl, indigenous
- Polystichum sinense (Christ) Christ, indigenous
- Polystichum transkeiense W.Jacobsen, indigenous
- Polystichum transvaalense N.C.Anthony, indigenous
- Polystichum wilsonii Christ, indigenous
- Polystichum x saltum J.P.Roux, endemic
- Pseudocyclosorus pulcher (Bory ex Willd.) Holttum, indigenous
- Psilotum nudum (L.) P.Beauv. indigenous
- Pteridium aquilinum (L.) Kuhn, indigenous
- Pteridium aquilinum (L.) Kuhn subsp. capense (Thunb.) C.Chr. indigenous
- Pteris buchananii Baker ex Sim, indigenous
- Pteris catoptera Kunze, indigenous
- Pteris catoptera Kunze var. horridula Schelpe, indigenous
- Pteris cretica L. indigenous
- Pteris dentata Forssk. indigenous
- Pteris friesii Hieron. indigenous
- Pteris tremula R.Br. endemic
- Pteris vittata L. indigenous
- Ptisana fraxinea (Sm.) Murdock, indigenous
- Ptisana fraxinea (Sm.) Murdock var. salicifolia (Schrad.) Murdock, indigenous
- Pyrrosia africana (Kunze) F.Ballard, indigenous
- Pyrrosia schimperiana (Mett. ex Kuhn) Alston, indigenous
- Pyrrosia schimperiana (Mett. ex Kuhn) Alston var. schimperiana, indigenous
- Rumohra adiantiformis (G.Forst.) Ching, indigenous
- Salvinia minima Baker, invasiv
- Salvinia molesta D.S.Mitch. invasive
- Schizaea pectinata (L.) Sw. indigenous
- Schizaea tenella Kaulf. indigenous
- Sphaerocionium aeruginosum (Poir.) Pic.Serm. indigenous
- Sphaerocionium capillare (Desv.) Copel. indigenous
- Sphaeropteris cooperi (Hook. ex F.Muell.) R.M.Tryon, cultivated, invasive
- Stegnogramma pozoi (Lag.) K.Iwats. indigenous
- Stenochlaena tenuifolia (Desv.) T.Moore, indigenous
- Sticherus umbraculiferus (Kunze) Ching, indigenous
- Tectaria gemmifera (Fee) Alston, indigenous
- Thelypteris altissima (Holttum) Vorster
- Thelypteris bergiana (Schltdl.) Ching
- Thelypteris chaseana Schelpe
- Thelypteris confluens (Thunb.) C.V.Morton, indigenous
- Thelypteris dentata (Forssk.) E.P.St.John
- Thelypteris gueinziana (Mett.) Schelpe
- Thelypteris interrupta (Willd.) K.Iwats
- Thelypteris knysnaensis N.C.Anthony & Schelpe
- Thelypteris madagascariensis (Fee) Schelpe
- Thelypteris oppositiformis (C.Chr.) Ching
- Thelypteris pozoi (Lag.) C.V.Morton
- Thelypteris pulchra (Bory ex Willd.) Schelpe
- Todea barbara (L.) T.Moore, indigenous
- Trichomanes borbonicum Bosch
- Trichomanes dregei Bosch, indigenous
- Trichomanes erosum Willd. var. aerugineum (Bosch) C.Chr. ex Bonap. indigenous
- Trichomanes inopinatum (Pic.Serm.) J.E.Burrows
- Trichomanes melanotrichum Schltdl.
- Trichomanes reptans Sw. indigenous
- Vittaria isoetifolia Bory, indigenous
- Woodsia angolensis Schelpe, indigenous
- Woodsia burgessiana Gerrard ex Hook. & Baker, indigenous
- Woodsia montevidensis (Spreng.) Hieron. var. burgessiana (Gerrard ex Hook. & Baker) Schelpe,

== See also ==
- Biodiversity of South Africa#Plants – Variety of life within South Africa and its exclusive economic zone
- List of conifers of South Africa – Plants of the class Pinophyta recorded from South Africa
- List of cycads of South Africa – Seed producing vascular plants of the division Cycadophyta recorded from South Africa
- Lists of flowering plants of South Africa – List of lists of flowering plants recorded from South Africa
- List of hornworts of South Africa – Non-vascular spore-bearing plants in the division Anthocerotophyta recorded from South Africa
- List of liverworts of South Africa – Non-vascular land plants with a gametophyte-dominant life cycle recorded from South Africa
- List of lycophytes of South Africa – Spore bearing vascular plants of the division Lycopodiophyta recorded from South Africa
- List of mosses of South Africa – Small, non-vascular flowerless plants recorded from South Africa
