= List of liverworts of South Africa =

Plant listing

This listing contains taxa of plants in the division Marchantiophyta, recorded from South Africa. The Marchantiophyta /mɑːrˌkæntiˈɒfɪtə/ are a division of non-vascular land plants commonly referred to as hepatics or liverworts. Like mosses and hornworts, they have a gametophyte-dominant life cycle, in which cells of the plant carry only a single set of genetic information.

It is estimated that there are about 9000 species of liverworts. Some of the more familiar species grow as a flattened leafless thallus, but most species are leafy with a form very much like a flattened moss. Leafy species can be distinguished from the apparently similar mosses on the basis of a number of features, including their single-celled rhizoids. Leafy liverworts also differ from most (but not all) mosses in that their leaves never have a costa (present in many mosses) and may bear marginal cilia (very rare in mosses). Other differences are not universal for all mosses and liverworts, but the occurrence of leaves arranged in three ranks, the presence of deep lobes or segmented leaves, or a lack of clearly differentiated stem and leaves all point to the plant being a liverwort.

Liverworts are typically small, usually from 2–20 mm wide with individual plants less than 10 cm long, and are therefore often overlooked. However, certain species may cover large patches of ground, rocks, trees or any other reasonably firm substrate on which they occur. They are distributed globally in almost every available habitat, most often in humid locations although there are desert and Arctic species as well.

23,420 species of vascular plant have been recorded in South Africa, making it the sixth most species-rich country in the world and the most species-rich country on the African continent. Of these, 153 species are considered to be threatened. Nine biomes have been described in South Africa: Fynbos, Succulent Karoo, desert, Nama Karoo, grassland, savanna, Albany thickets, the Indian Ocean coastal belt, and forests.

The 2018 South African National Biodiversity Institute's National Biodiversity Assessment plant checklist lists 35,130 taxa in the phyla Anthocerotophyta (hornworts (6)), Anthophyta (flowering plants(33534)), Bryophyta (mosses (685)), Cycadophyta (cycads (42)), Lycopodiophyta (Lycophytes(45)), Marchantiophyta (liverworts (376)), Pinophyta (conifers (33)), and Pteridophyta (cryptograms(408)).

== Listing ==
- Acanthocoleus aberrans (Lindenb. & Gottsche) Kruijt, indigenous
- Acanthocoleus aberrans (Lindenb. & Gottsche) Kruijt var. laevis Gradst. indigenous
- Acanthocoleus chrysophyllus (Lehm.) Kruijt, indigenous
- Acanthocoleus madagascariensis (Steph.) Kruijt, indigenous
- Acrobolbus excisus (Mitt.) Schiffn. synonym
- Acrobolbus ochrophyllus (Hook.f. & Taylor) R.M.Schust. indigenous
- Acromastigum exile (Lindenb.) A.Evans, endemic
- Adelanthus decipiens (Hook.) Mitt. indigenous
- Adelanthus lindenbergianus (Lehm.) Mitt. indigenous
- Alobiella heteromorpha (Lehm.) Steph. Synonym
- Alobiella pillansii (Sim) S.W.Arnell, Synonym
- Alobiellopsis heteromorpha (Lehm.) R.M.Schust. indigenous
- Alobiellopsis pillansii (Sim) R.M.Schust. endemic
- Anastrophyllum auritum (Lehm.) Steph. indigenous
- Anastrophyllum minutum (Schreb.) R.M.Schust. indigenous
- Aneura pinguis (L.) Dumort. indigenous
- Aphanolejeunea capensis (S.W.Arnell) S.W.Arnell, indigenous
- Arachniopsis diacantha (Mont.) M.Howe, indigenous
- Archilejeunea elobulata Steph. indigenous
- Asterella abyssinica (Gottsche) Grolle, indigenous
- Asterella bachmannii (Steph.) S.W.Arnell, indigenous
- Asterella marginata (Nees) S.W.Arnell, endemic
- Asterella muscicola (Steph.) S.W.Arnell, indigenous
- Asterella wilmsii (Steph.) S.W.Arnell, indigenous
- Athalamia spathysii (Lindenb.) S.Hatt. indigenous
- Bazzania borbonica (Steph.) Steph. synonym
- Bazzania decrescens (Lehm. & Lindenb.) Trevis. indigenous
- Bazzania nitida (F.Weber) Grolle, indigenous
- Bazzania praerupta (Reinw., Blume & Nees) Trevis. indigenous
- Brachiolejeunea phyllorhiza (Nees) Kruijt & Gradst. indigenous
- Calypogeia arguta Nees & Mont. indigenous
- Calypogeia bidentula (F.Weber) Nees, indigenous
- Calypogeia fissa (L.) Raddi, indigenous
- Calypogeia fusca (Lehm.) Steph. synonym
- Calypogeia longifolia Steph. indigenous
- Calypogeia microstipula (Steph.) Steph. indigenous
- Caudalejeunea africana (Steph.) Steph. indigenous
- Caudalejeunea hanningtonii (Mitt.) Schiffn. indigenous
- Cephalozia bicuspidata (L.) Dumort. indigenous
- Cephalozia connivens (Dicks.) Lindb. indigenous
- Cephalozia connivens (Dicks.) Lindb. subsp. fissa (Steph.) Vana, indigenous
- Cephalozia fissa Steph. synonym
- Cephaloziella anthelioides S.W.Arnell, endemic
- Cephaloziella capensis (Sim) S.W.Arnell, endemic
- Cephaloziella garsidei S.W.Arnell, indigenous
- Cephaloziella kiaerii (Austin) Douin, indigenous
- Cephaloziella lycopodioides (Sim) S.W.Arnell, endemic
- Cephaloziella natalensis (Sim) S.W.Arnell, endemic
- Cephaloziella schelpei S.W.Arnell, endemic
- Cephaloziella tabularis S.W.Arnell, endemic
- Cephaloziella tenuissima (Lehm. & Lindenb.) Steph. indigenous
- Cephaloziella transvaalensis S.W.Arnell, indigenous
- Cephaloziella triplicata S.W.Arnell, endemic
- Chandonanthus hirtellus (F.Weber) Mitt. synonym
- Cheilolejeunea convexa (S.W.Arnell) S.W.Arnell, endemic
- Cheilolejeunea inflata Steph. synonym
- Cheilolejeunea intertexta (Lindenb.) Steph. indigenous
- Cheilolejeunea krakakammae (Lindenb.) R.M.Schust. indigenous
- Cheilolejeunea pluriplicata (Pearson) R.M.Schust. indigenous
- Cheilolejeunea pocsii E.W.Jones, indigenous
- Cheilolejeunea rufescens (Lindenb.) Grolle, indigenous
- Chiloscyphus muricatus (Lehm.) J.J.Engel & R.M.Schust. synonym
- Clasmatocolea fasciculata (Nees) Grolle, endemic
- Clasmatocolea vermicularis (Lehm.) Grolle, indigenous
- Cololejeunea cardiocarpa (Mont.) A.Evans, indigenous
- Cololejeunea dissita E.W.Jones, synonym
- Cololejeunea minutissima (Sm.) Schiffn. indigenous
- Cololejeunea minutissima (Sm.) Schiffn. subsp. minutissima, indigenous
- Cololejeunea minutissima (Sm.) Schiffn. subsp. myriocarpa (Nees & Mont.) R.M.Schust. indigenous
- Cololejeunea mocambiquensis S.W.Arnell, indigenous
- Cololejeunea myriantha (Herzog) S.W.Arnell, synonym
- Cololejeunea occidentalis (E.W.Jones) Vanden Berghen, indigenous
- Cololejeunea oleana Sim, endemic
- Colura calyptrifolia (Hook.) Dumort. indigenous
- Colura tenuicornis (A.Evans) Steph. indigenous
- Cryptochila grandiflora (Lindenb. & Gottsche) Grolle, indigenous
- Cylindrocolea atroviridis (Sim) Vana, indigenous
- Dicranolejeunea chrysophylla (Lehm.) Grolle, indigenous
- Dicranolejeunea madagascariensis Steph. synonym
- Dicranolejeunea phyllorhiza (Nees) Schiffn. synonym
- Diplasiolejeunea cavifolia Steph. synonym
- Diplasiolejeunea kraussiana (Lindenb.) Steph. indigenous
- Drepanolejeunea hamatifolia (Hook.) Schiffn. indigenous
- Drepanolejeunea papillosa S.W.Arnell, endemic
- Drepanolejeunea physaefolia (Gottsche) Steph. indigenous
- Drepanolejeunea vesiculosa (Mitt.) Steph. synonym
- Dumortiera hirsuta (Sw.) Nees, indigenous
- Exormotheca holstii Steph. indigenous
- Exormotheca megastomata Marquand, synonym
- Exormotheca pustulosa Mitt. indigenous
- Fossombronia capensis S.W.Arnell, indigenous
- Fossombronia capensis S.W.Arnell var. capensis, endemic
- Fossombronia capensis S.W.Arnell var. spiralis Perold, endemic
- Fossombronia cederbergensis Perold, endemic
- Fossombronia crispa Nees, indigenous
- Fossombronia densilamellata S.W.Arnell, endemic
- Fossombronia elsieae Perold, endemic
- Fossombronia gemmifera Perold, indigenous
- Fossombronia glenii Perold, indigenous
- Fossombronia hyalorhiza Perold, endemic
- Fossombronia leucoxantha Lehm. endemic
- Fossombronia marindae Perold, endemic
- Fossombronia montaguensis S.W.Arnell, endemic
- Fossombronia monticola Perold, endemic
- Fossombronia renateae Perold, endemic
- Fossombronia spinifolia Steph. endemic
- Fossombronia spinosa Perold, endemic
- Fossombronia straussiana Perold, indigenous
- Fossombronia swaziensis Perold, indigenous
- Fossombronia tumida Mitt. endemic
- Fossombronia zeyheri Steph. synonym
- Fossombronia zuurbergensis Perold, endemic
- Frullania anderssonii Angstr. indigenous
- Frullania arecae (Spreng.) Gottsche, indigenous
- Frullania brunnea (Spreng.) Gottsche, Lindenb. & Nees, indigenous
- Frullania caffraria Steph. indigenous
- Frullania capensis Gottsche, indigenous
- Frullania depressa Mitt. indigenous
- Frullania diptera (Lehm.) Drege, indigenous
- Frullania ecklonii (Spreng.) Gottsche, Lindenb. & Nees, indigenous
- Frullania eplicata Steph. indigenous
- Frullania ericoides (Nees) Mont. indigenous
- Frullania lindenbergii Lehm. indigenous
- Frullania obscurifolia Mitt. indigenous
- Frullania serrata Gottsche, indigenous
- Frullania socotrana Mitt. indigenous
- Frullania spongiosa Steph. indigenous
- Frullania trinervis (Lehm.) Drege, indigenous
- Frullania variegata Steph. indigenous
- Frullanoides tristis (Steph.) Van Slageren, indigenous
- Gongylanthus ericetorum (Raddi) Nees, indigenous
- Gongylanthus renifolius (Mitt.) Steph. indigenous
- Gongylanthus scariosus (Lehm.) Steph. indigenous
- Gottschea sphagnoides (Schwagr.) Lindb. indigenous
- Gymnocoleopsis capensis (S.W.Arnell) R.M.Schust. endemic
- Gymnomitrion andinum (Herzog) Herzog, endemic
- Gymnomitrion laceratum (Steph.) T.Horik. indigenous
- Herbertus capensis (Steph.) Sim, indigenous
- Herbertus dicranus (Taylor ex Gottsche et al.) Trevis. indigenous
- Heteroscyphus dubius (Gottsche) Schiffn. indigenous
- Hyalolepidozia bicuspidata (C.Massal.) S.W.Arnell ex Grolle, indigenous
- Isotachis aubertii (Schwagr.) Mitt. indigenous
- Jamesoniella colorata (Lehm.) Schiffn. indigenous
- Jamesoniella grandiflora (Lindenb. & Gottsche) Steph. synonym
- Jamesoniella oenops (Lindenb. & Gottsche) Steph. synonym
- Jamesoniella paludosa Steph. synonym
- Jamesoniella purpurascens Steph. indigenous
- Jamesoniella rehmannii Steph. synonym
- Jensenia spinosa (Lindenb. & Gottsche) Grolle, indigenous
- Jungermannia austroafricana S.W.Arnell, synonym
- Jungermannia borgenii Gottsche ex Pearson, indigenous
- Jungermannia mildbraedii Steph. indigenous
- Jungermannia pocsii Vana, indigenous
- Jungermannia pumila With. indigenous
- Jungermannia sphaerocarpa Hook. indigenous
- Jungermannia stolonifera Steph. synonym
- Kurzia capillaris (Sw.) Grolle, indigenous
- Kurzia capillaris (Sw.) Grolle subsp. capillaris,
- Kurzia irregularis (Steph.) Grolle, indigenous
- Lejeunea brittoniae (A.Evans) Grolle, synonym
- Lejeunea caespitosa Lindenb. indigenous
- Lejeunea capensis Gottsche, indigenous
- Lejeunea duncaniae (Sim) S.W.Arnell, endemic
- Lejeunea eckloniana Lindenb. indigenous
- Lejeunea helenae Pearson, indigenous
- Lejeunea isophylla E.W.Jones, indigenous
- Lejeunea phyllobola Nees & Mont. indigenous
- Lejeunea rhodesiae (Sim) R.M.Schust. indigenous
- Lejeunea tabularis (Spreng.) Gottsche, Lindenb. & Nees, indigenous
- Lejeunea villaumei (Steph.) Grolle, indigenous
- Lepicolea ochroleuca (Spreng.) Spruce, indigenous
- Lepidozia cupressina (Sw.) Lindenb. indigenous
- Lepidozia cupressina (Sw.) Lindenb. subsp. cupressina, indigenous
- Lepidozia cupressina (Sw.) Lindenb. subsp. natalensis (Steph.) Pocs, indigenous
- Lepidozia pearsonii Spruce, indigenous
- Lepidozia stuhlmannia Steph. indigenous
- Lepidozia stuhlmannia Steph. subsp. stuhlmannia, indigenous
- Leptocolea cristata (Steph.) E.W.Jones, synonym
- Leptoscyphus diversifolius (Gottsche) Grolle, endemic
- Leptoscyphus expansus (Lehm.) Grolle, indigenous
- Leptoscyphus iversenii (Pearson) Sim, synonym
- Lethocolea congesta (Lehm.) S.W.Arnell, indigenous
- Leucolejeunea rotundistipula (Lindenb. ex Lehm.) A.Evans, indigenous
- Leucolejeunea unciloba (Lindenb.) A.Evans, indigenous
- Leucolejeunea xanthocarpa (Lehm. & Lindenb.) A.Evans, indigenous
- Lophocolea bewsii (Sim) Grolle, indigenous
- Lophocolea bidentata (L.) Dumort. indigenous
- Lophocolea concreta Mont. indigenous
- Lophocolea difformis Nees, indigenous
- Lophocolea fragrans (Moris & De Not.) Gottsche, Lindenb. & Nees, indigenous
- Lophocolea lucida (Spreng. ex Lehm.) Mont. indigenous
- Lophocolea martiana Nees, indigenous
- Lophocolea muricata (Lehm.) Nees, indigenous
- Lophocolea semiteres (Lehm.) Mitt. indigenous
- Lopholejeunea fragilis Steph. synonym
- Lopholejeunea nigricans (Lindenb.) Schiffn. indigenous
- Lopholejeunea subfusca (Nees) Schiffn. indigenous
- Lophozia argentina (Steph.) R.M.Schust. indigenous
- Lophozia capensis S.W.Arnell, synonym
- Lophozia montaguensis S.W.Arnell, synonym
- Lunularia cruciata (L.) Dumort. ex Lindb. indigenous
- Mannia capensis (Steph.) S.W.Arnell, indigenous
- Marchantia berteroana Lehm. & Lindenb. indigenous
- Marchantia debilis K.I.Goebel, indigenous
- Marchantia paleacea Bertol. indigenous
- Marchantia pappeana Lehm. indigenous
- Marchantia pappeana Lehm. subsp. pappeana, indigenous
- Marchantia polymorpha L. subsp. ruderalis Bischl. & Boissel.
- Marchantia wilmsii Steph. synonym
- Marsupella capensis S.W.Arnell, synonym
- Marsupella sparsifolia (Lindb.) Dumort. indigenous
- Marsupidium brevifolium Steph. synonym
- Marsupidium limbatum (Steph.) Grolle, indigenous
- Metzgeria africana Steph. synonym
- Metzgeria agnewiae Kuwah. synonym
- Metzgeria australis Steph. synonym
- Metzgeria consanguinea Schiffn. indigenous
- Metzgeria decipiens (C.Massal.) Schiffn. synonym
- Metzgeria elliotii Steph. synonym
- Metzgeria furcata (L.) Dumort. indigenous
- Metzgeria leptoneura Spruce, indigenous
- Metzgeria limbato-setosa Steph. synonym
- Metzgeria madagassa Steph. indigenous
- Metzgeria nicomariei Veltman & Potgieter, synonym
- Metzgeria nudifrons Steph. indigenous
- Metzgeria perrotana Steph. synonym
- Metzgeria saxbyi Pearson, indigenous
- Metzgeria tabularis Steph. synonym
- Metzgeria violacea (Ach.) Dumort. indigenous
- Microlejeunea africana Steph. indigenous
- Mnioloma fuscum (Lehm.) R.M.Schust. indigenous
- Monocarpus sphaerocarpus D.J.Carr indigenous
- Notoscyphus belangerianus (Lehm. & Lindenb.) Mitt. synonym
- Notoscyphus jackii (Steph.) Steph. synonym
- Notoscyphus lutescens (Lehm. & Lindenb.) Mitt. indigenous
- Odontoschisma africanum (Pearson) Sim, indigenous
- Oxymitra cristata Garside ex Perold, indigenous
- Pallavicinia lyellii (Hook.) Carruth. indigenous
- Paracromastigum succulentum (Sim) J.J.Engel & G.L.S.Merr. endemic
- Phragmilejeunea molleri (Steph.) R.M.Schust. synonym
- Phragmilejeunea pappeana (Nees) R.M.Schust. synonym
- Plagiochasma appendiculatum Lehm. & Lindenb. indigenous
- Plagiochasma beccarianum Steph. indigenous
- Plagiochasma eximium (Schiffn.) Steph. indigenous
- Plagiochasma microcephalum (Steph.) Steph. indigenous
- Plagiochasma microcephalum (Steph.) Steph. var. microcephalum, indigenous
- Plagiochasma rupestre (J.R.Forst. & G.Forst.) Steph. indigenous
- Plagiochasma rupestre (J.R.Forst. & G.Forst.) Steph. var. rupestre, indigenous
- Plagiochasma rupestre (J.R.Forst. & G.Forst.) Steph. var. volkii Bischl. indigenous
- Plagiochila exigua (Taylor) Taylor, indigenous
- Plagiochila haumannii Herzog, indigenous
- Plagiochila heterostipa Steph. indigenous
- Plagiochila injasutiensis S.W.Arnell, indigenous
- Plagiochila lastii Mitt. indigenous
- Plagiochila lunata S.W.Arnell, indigenous
- Plagiochila pseudoattenuata S.W.Arnell, indigenous
- Plagiochila sarmentosa (Lehm. & Lindenb.) Lindenb. endemic
- Plagiochila squamulosa Mitt. indigenous
- Plagiochila squamulosa Mitt. var. crispulo-caudata (Gottsche) Vanden Berghen, indigenous
- Plagiochila terebrans Nees & Mont. ex Lindenb. indigenous
- Plagiochila wilmsiana Steph. endemic
- Plicanthus hirtellus (F.Weber) R.M.Schust. indigenous
- Porella abyssinica (Nees) Trevis. indigenous
- Porella abyssinica (Nees) Trevis. var. hoehnelii (Steph.) Pocs, indigenous
- Porella capensis (Gottsche) Steph. indigenous
- Porella hoehnelii Steph. synonym
- Porella vallis-gratiae (Gottsche) S.W.Arnell, indigenous
- Psiloclada clandestina Mitt. endemic
- Ptychanthus striatus (Lehm. & Lindenb.) Nees, indigenous
- Radula ankefinensis Gottsche, indigenous
- Radula boryana (F.Weber) Mont. indigenous
- Radula fulvifolia (Hook.f. & Taylor) Gottsche, Lindenb. & Nees, indigenous
- Radula holstiana Steph. synonym
- Radula lindenbergiana Gottsche ex C.Hartm. indigenous
- Radula quadrata Gottsche, indigenous
- Radula recurvifolia Steph. synonym
- Radula stenocalyx Mont. indigenous
- Radula stipatiflora Steph. synonym
- Radula tabularis Steph. endemic
- Radula voluta Taylor ex Gottsche, Lindenb. & Nees, indigenous
- Rectolejeunea brittonae A.Evans, synonym
- Riccardia amazonica (Spruce) Schiffn. ex Gradst. & Hekking, indigenous
- Riccardia capensis S.W.Arnell, endemic
- Riccardia compacta (Steph.) S.W.Arnell, indigenous
- Riccardia fastigiata (Lehm.) Trevis. indigenous
- Riccardia limbata (Steph.) E.W.Jones, indigenous
- Riccardia multifida (L.) Gray, indigenous
- Riccardia obtusa S.W.Arnell, endemic
- Riccardia saccatiflora (Steph.) S.W.Arnell, synonym
- Riccardia stephanii (Besch. ex Steph.) E.W.Jones, synonym
- Riccia alatospora O.H.Volk & Perold, endemic
- Riccia albolimbata S.W.Arnell, indigenous
- Riccia albomarginata Bisch. endemic
- Riccia alboporosa Perold, endemic
- Riccia albornata O.H.Volk & Perold, endemic
- Riccia albovestita O.H.Volk, indigenous
- Riccia ampullacea Perold, indigenous
- Riccia angolensis Steph. indigenous
- Riccia argenteolimbata O.H.Volk & Perold, indigenous
- Riccia atropurpurea Sim, indigenous
- Riccia bicolorata Perold, endemic
- Riccia bullosa Link ex Lindenb. indigenous
- Riccia cavernosa Hoffm. indigenous
- Riccia compacta Garside, endemic
- Riccia concava Bisch. endemic
- Riccia congoana Steph. indigenous
- Riccia crinita Taylor, indigenous
- Riccia crozalsii Levier, indigenous
- Riccia crystallina L. indigenous
- Riccia cupulifera A.V.Duthie, endemic
- Riccia curtisii (James ex Austin) Austin, indigenous
- Riccia elongata Perold, endemic
- Riccia furfuracea Perold, endemic
- Riccia garsidei Sim, endemic
- Riccia hantamensis Perold, endemic
- Riccia hirsuta O.H.Volk & Perold, endemic
- Riccia lanceolata Steph. indigenous
- Riccia limbata Bisch. endemic
- Riccia macrocarpa Levier, indigenous
- Riccia mammifera O.H.Volk & Perold, endemic
- Riccia mamrensis Perold, endemic
- Riccia microciliata O.H.Volk & Perold, indigenous
- Riccia moenkemeyeri Steph. indigenous
- Riccia montana Perold, indigenous
- Riccia namaquensis Perold, endemic
- Riccia natalensis Sim, endemic
- Riccia nigrella DC. indigenous
- Riccia okahandjana S.W.Arnell, indigenous
- Riccia parvoareolata O.H.Volk & Perold, endemic
- Riccia pottsiana Sim, endemic
- Riccia pulveracea Perold, endemic
- Riccia purpurascens Lehm. endemic
- Riccia radiata Perold, endemic
- Riccia rosea O.H.Volk & Perold, indigenous
- Riccia rubricollis Garside & A.V.Duthie ex Perold, endemic
- Riccia runssorensis Steph. indigenous
- Riccia schelpei O.H.Volk & Perold, endemic
- Riccia sibayenii Perold, endemic
- Riccia simii Perold, indigenous
- Riccia sorocarpa Bisch. indigenous
- Riccia stricta (Lindenb.) Perold, indigenous
- Riccia tomentosa O.H.Volk & Perold, endemic
- Riccia trichocarpa M.Howe, synonym
- Riccia villosa Steph. endemic
- Riccia vitrea Perold, endemic
- Riccia volkii S.W.Arnell, indigenous
- Ricciocarpos natans (L.) Corda, indigenous
- Riella affinis M.Howe & Underw. indigenous
- Riella alatospora Wigglesw. endemic
- Riella capensis Cavers, endemic
- Riella echinospora Wigglesw. indigenous
- Riella purpureospora Wigglesw. endemic
- Scapania cuspiduligera (Nees) Mull.Frib. indigenous
- Schiffneriolejeunea pappeana (Nees) Gradst. indigenous
- Schiffneriolejeunea pappeana (Nees) Gradst. var. pappeana, indigenous
- Schiffneriolejeunea polycarpa (Nees) Gradst. indigenous
- Schistochila alata (Lehm.) Schiffn. indigenous
- Schistochila sphagnoides (Schwagr.) Steph. synonym
- Sphaerocarpos stipitatus Bisch. ex Lindenb. indigenous
- Stephaniella paraphyllina Jack, indigenous
- Strepsilejeunea georgensis S.W.Arnell, synonym
- Symphyogyna brasiliensis Nees & Mont. indigenous
- Symphyogyna podophylla (Thunb.) Nees & Mont. indigenous
- Targionia hypophylla L. indigenous
- Targionia hypophylla L. var. capensis Huebener, indigenous
- Taxilejeunea conformis (Nees & Mont.) Steph. indigenous
- Taxilejeunea vallis-gratiae Steph. indigenous
- Telaranea redacta (Steph.) J.J.Engel & G.L.S.Merr. indigenous
- Telaranea succulenta (Sim) Grolle, synonym
- Thysananthus africanus (Sim) S.W.Arnell, synonym
- Trachyphyllum dusenii (Mull.Hal. ex Broth.) Broth. indigenous
- Trachyphyllum gastrodes (Welw. & Duby) A.Gepp, indigenous
- Trachyphyllum inflexum (Harv.) A.Gepp, indigenous
- Tritomaria exsecta (Schmidel) Loeske, indigenous
- Tylimanthus africanus Pearson, endemic
- Tylimanthus wilmsii Steph. synonym

== See also ==
- Biodiversity of South Africa#Plants – Variety of life within South Africa and its exclusive economic zone
- List of conifers of South Africa – Plants of the class Pinophyta recorded from South Africa
- List of cycads of South Africa – Seed producing vascular plants of the division Cycadophyta recorded from South Africa
- Lists of flowering plants of South Africa – List of lists of flowering plants recorded from South Africa
- List of hornworts of South Africa
- List of lycophytes of South Africa – Spore bearing vascular plants of the division Lycopodiophyta recorded from South Africa
- List of mosses of South Africa – Small, non-vascular flowerless plants recorded from South Africa
- List of pteridophytes of South Africa – Spore-bearing vascular plants recorded from South Africa
