= List of conifers of South Africa =

Plants of the class Pinophyta recorded from South Africa

This listing contains taxa of plants in the division Pinophyta, recorded from South Africa. Also known as Coniferophyta or Coniferae, or commonly as conifers, Pinophyta are a division of vascular land plants containing a single extant class, Pinopsida. They are cone-bearing seed plants, a subset of gymnosperms. All extant conifers are perennial woody plants with secondary growth. The great majority are trees, though a few are shrubs. As of 1998, the division Pinophyta was estimated to contain eight families, 68 genera, and 629 living species.

Although the total number of species is relatively small, conifers are ecologically important. They are the dominant plants over large areas of land, most notably the taiga of the Northern Hemisphere, but also in similar cool climates in mountains further south. While tropical rainforests have more biodiversity and turnover, the immense conifer forests of the world represent the largest terrestrial carbon sink. Conifers are of great economic value for softwood lumber and paper production.

23,420 species of vascular plant have been recorded in South Africa, making it the sixth most species-rich country in the world and the most species-rich country on the African continent. Of these, 153 species are considered to be threatened. Nine biomes have been described in South Africa: Fynbos, Succulent Karoo, desert, Nama Karoo, grassland, savanna, Albany thickets, the Indian Ocean coastal belt, and forests.

The 2018 South African National Biodiversity Institute's National Biodiversity Assessment plant checklist lists 35,130 taxa in the phyla Anthocerotophyta (hornworts (6)), Anthophyta (flowering plants(33534)), Bryophyta (mosses (685)), Cycadophyta (cycads (42)), Lycopodiophyta (Lycophytes(45)), Marchantiophyta (liverworts (376)), Pinophyta (conifers (32)), and Pteridophyta {cryptograms(408)).

== Listing ==
- Cryptomeria japonica (L.f.) D.Don
- Cupressus arizonica Greene var. arizonica
- Cupressus arizonica Greene var. glabra (Sudw.) Little
- Cupressus arizonica Greene var. montana (Wiggins) Little
- Cupressus lusitanica Mill. var. lusitanica
- Cupressus sempervirens L. var. sempervirens
- Juniperus bermudiana L.
- Juniperus pinchotii Sudw.
- Juniperus virginiana L.
- Pinus canariensis C.Sm. ex DC.
- Pinus coulteri D.Don
- Pinus elliottii Engelm.
- Pinus elliottii Engelm. var. elliottii
- Pinus halepensis Mill.
- Pinus halepensis Mill. var. halepensis
- Pinus patula Schltdl. & Cham.
- Pinus patula Schltdl. & Cham. var. patula
- Pinus pinaster Aiton
- Pinus pinea L.
- Pinus radiata D.Don
- Pinus roxburghii Sarg.
- Pinus taeda L.
- Podocarpus elongatus (Aiton) L'Her. ex Pers. Endemic
- Podocarpus falcatus (Thunb.) R.Br. ex Mirb. Indigenous
- Podocarpus henkelii Stapf ex Dallim. & A.B.Jacks. Endemic
- Podocarpus latifolius (Thunb.) R.Br. ex Mirb. Indigenous
- Taxodium distichum (L.) Rich. var. distichum
- Widdringtonia cedarbergensis J.A.Marsh nom. superfl. Endemic
- Widdringtonia nodiflora (L.) Powrie, Indigenous
- Widdringtonia nodiflora (L.) Powrie var. dracomontana (Stapf) Silba, Indigenous
- Widdringtonia schwarzii (Marloth) Mast. Endemic
- Widdringtonia wallichii Endl. ex Carriere, Endemic

== See also ==
- Biodiversity of South Africa#Plants – Variety of life within South Africa and its exclusive economic zone
- List of cycads of South Africa – Seed producing vascular plants of the division Cycadophyta recorded from South Africa
- Lists of flowering plants of South Africa – List of lists of flowering plants recorded from South Africa
- List of hornworts of South Africa – Non-vascular spore-bearing plants in the division Anthocerotophyta recorded from South Africa
- List of liverworts of South Africa – Non-vascular land plants with a gametophyte-dominant life cycle recorded from South Africa
- List of lycophytes of South Africa – Spore bearing vascular plants of the division Lycopodiophyta recorded from South Africa
- List of mosses of South Africa – Small, non-vascular flowerless plants recorded from South Africa
- List of pteridophytes of South Africa – Spore-bearing vascular plants recorded from South Africa
