= List of lycophytes of South Africa =

Spore bearing vascular plants of South Africa

This listing contains taxa of plants in the division Lycopodiophyta, recorded from South Africa.The lycophytes, when broadly circumscribed, are a vascular plant (tracheophyte) subgroup of the kingdom Plantae. They are sometimes placed in a division Lycopodiophyta or Lycophyta or in a subdivision Lycopodiophytina. They are one of the oldest lineages of extant (living) vascular plants; the group contains extinct plants that have been dated from the Silurian (ca. 425 million years ago). Lycophytes were some of the dominating plant species of the Carboniferous period, and included tree-like species, although extant lycophytes are relatively small plants.

23,420 species of vascular plant have been recorded in South Africa, making it the sixth most species-rich country in the world and the most species-rich country on the African continent. Of these, 153 species are considered to be threatened. Nine biomes have been described in South Africa: Fynbos, Succulent Karoo, desert, Nama Karoo, grassland, savanna, Albany thickets, the Indian Ocean coastal belt, and forests.

The 2018 South African National Biodiversity Institute's National Biodiversity Assessment plant checklist lists 35,130 taxa in the phyla Anthocerotophyta (hornworts (6)), Anthophyta (flowering plants(33534)), Bryophyta (mosses (685)), Cycadophyta (cycads (42)), Lycopodiophyta (Lycophytes(45)), Marchantiophyta (liverworts (376)), Pinophyta (conifers (33)), and Pteridophyta {cryptograms(408)).

Names are given as listed in the source. Where the accepted name at source date differs, it is appended.

== Listing ==
- Huperzia dacrydioides (Baker) Pic.Serm. indigenous
- Huperzia gnidioides (L.f.) Trevis. indigenous
- Huperzia ophioglossoides (Lam.) Rothm. indigenous
- Huperzia saururus (Lam.) Trevis. indigenous
- Huperzia verticillata (L.f.) Trevis. indigenous
- Isoetes aemulans J.P.Roux, indigenous
- Isoetes aequinoctialis Welw. ex A.Braun, indigenous
- Isoetes capensis A.V.Duthie, endemic
- Isoetes capensis A.V.Duthie var. stephanseniae (A.V.Duthie) Schelpe & N.C.Anthony, synonym for Isoetes stephansenii A.V.Duthie
- Isoetes eludens J.P.Roux, Hopper & Rhian J.Sm. indigenous
- Isoetes labri-draconis N.R.Crouch, indigenous
- Isoetes schweinfurthii A.Braun ex Baker, indigenous
- Isoetes stellenbossiensis A.V.Duthie, endemic
- Isoetes stephansenii A.V.Duthie, endemic
- Isoetes toximontana Musselman & J.P.Roux, indigenous
- Isoetes transvaalensis Jermy & Schelpe, indigenous
- Isoetes welwitschii A.Braun, indigenous
- Isoetes wormaldii Sim, endemic
- Lycopodiella caroliniana (L.) Pic.Serm. indigenous
- Lycopodiella cernua (L.) Pic.Serm. indigenous
- Lycopodiella sarcocaulon (A.Braun & Welw. ex Kuhn) Pic.Serm. indigenous
- Lycopodium carolinianum L. synonym for Lycopodiella caroliniana (L.) Pic.Serm.
- Lycopodium carolinianum L. var. grandifolium Spring, synonym for Lycopodiella sarcocaulon (A.Braun & Welw. ex Kuhn) Pic.Serm.
- Lycopodium cernuum L. synonym for Lycopodiella cernua (L.) Pic.Serm.
- Lycopodium clavatum L. indigenous
- Lycopodium complanatum L. subsp. zanclophyllum (J.H.Wilce) Schelpe, synonym for Lycopodium zanclophyllum J.H.Wilce
- Lycopodium dacrydioides Baker, synonym for Huperzia dacrydioides (Baker) Pic.Serm.
- Lycopodium gnidioides L.f. synonym for Huperzia gnidioides (L.f.) Trevis.
- Lycopodium ophioglossoides Lam. synonym for Huperzia ophioglossoides (Lam.) Rothm.
- Lycopodium sarcocaulon A.Braun & Welw. ex Kuhn, synonym for Lycopodiella sarcocaulon (A.Braun & Welw. ex Kuhn) Pic.Serm.
- Lycopodium saururus Lam. synonym for Huperzia saururus (Lam.) Trevis.
- Lycopodium verticillatum L.f. synonym for Huperzia verticillata (L.f.) Trevis.
- Lycopodium zanclophyllum J.H.Wilce, indigenous
- Selaginella caffrorum (Milde) Hieron. indigenous
- Selaginella caffrorum (Milde) Hieron. var. caffrorum, indigenous
- Selaginella culverwellii N.R.Crouch, indigenous
- Selaginella dregei (C.Presl) Hieron. indigenous
- Selaginella grisea Alston, indigenous
- Selaginella imbricata (Forssk.) Spring ex Decne. indigenous
- Selaginella kraussiana (Kunze) A.Braun, indigenous
- Selaginella mittenii Baker, indigenous
- Selaginella nivea Alston, indigenous
- Selaginella nivea Alston ex Alston subsp. nivea, indigenous
- Selaginella nubigena J.P.Roux, indigenous
- Selaginella pygmaea (Kaulf.) Alston, indigenous

== See also ==
- Biodiversity of South Africa#Plants – Variety of life within South Africa and its exclusive economic zone
- List of conifers of South Africa – Plants of the class Pinophyta recorded from South Africa
- List of cycads of South Africa – Seed producing vascular plants of the division Cycadophyta recorded from South Africa
- Lists of flowering plants of South Africa – List of lists of flowering plants recorded from South Africa
- List of hornworts of South Africa
- List of liverworts of South Africa – Plant listing
- List of mosses of South Africa – Small, non-vascular flowerless plants recorded from South Africa
- List of pteridophytes of South Africa – Spore-bearing vascular plants recorded from South Africa
