= List of mosses of South Africa =

Small, non-vascular flowerless plants recorded from South Africa

This listing contains taxa of plants in the division Bryophyta, recorded from South Africa. Mosses, or the taxonomic division Bryophyta, are small, non-vascular flowerless plants that typically form dense green clumps or mats, often in damp or shady locations. The individual plants are usually composed of simple leaves that are generally only one cell thick, attached to a stem that may be branched or unbranched and has only a limited role in conducting water and nutrients. Although some species have conducting tissues, these are generally poorly developed and structurally different from similar tissue found in vascular plants. Mosses do not have seeds and after fertilisation develop sporophytes with unbranched stalks topped with single capsules containing spores. They are typically 0.2–10 cm (0.1–3.9 in) tall, though some species are much larger. Dawsonia, the tallest moss in the world, can grow to 50 cm (20 in) in height.

Mosses are commonly confused with hornworts, liverworts and lichens. Mosses were formerly grouped with the hornworts and liverworts as "non-vascular" plants in the division "bryophytes", all of them having the haploid gametophyte generation as the dominant phase of the life cycle. This contrasts with the pattern in all vascular plants (seed plants and pteridophytes), where the diploid sporophyte generation is dominant. Lichens may superficially resemble mosses, and sometimes have common names that include the word "moss" (e.g., "reindeer moss" or "Iceland moss"), but they are not related to mosses. Mosses are now classified on their own as the division Bryophyta. There are approximately 12,000 species.

23,420 species of vascular plant have been recorded in South Africa, making it the sixth most species-rich country in the world and the most species-rich country on the African continent. Of these, 153 species are considered to be threatened. Nine biomes have been described in South Africa: Fynbos, Succulent Karoo, desert, Nama Karoo, grassland, savanna, Albany thickets, the Indian Ocean coastal belt, and forests.

The 2018 South African National Biodiversity Institute's National Biodiversity Assessment plant checklist lists 35,130 taxa in the phyla Anthocerotophyta (hornworts (6)), Anthophyta (flowering plants(33534)), Bryophyta (mosses (685)), Cycadophyta (cycads (42)), Lycopodiophyta (Lycophytes(45)), Marchantiophyta (liverworts (376)), Pinophyta (conifers (33)), and Pteridophyta {cryptograms(408)).

== Listing ==
- Abietinella abietina (Hedw.) M.Fleisch. indigenous
- Acaulon leucochaete I.G.Stone, indigenous
- Acaulon recurvatum Magill, endemic
- Acaulon rufochaete Magill
- Acaulonopsis eureka R.H.Zander & Hedd. endemic
- Acaulonopsis fynbosensis R.H.Zander & Hedd. indigenous
- Aerobryopsis capensis (Mull.Hal.) M.Fleisch. indigenous
- Algaria nataliei Hedd. & R.H.Zander, endemic
- Aloina bifrons (De Not.) Delgad. indigenous
- Amphidium lapponicum (Hedw.) Schimp. indigenous
- Amphidium tortuosum (Hornsch.) Cufod. indigenous
- Anacolia breutelii (Schimp. ex Mull.Hal.) Magill indigenous
- Anacolia breutelii (Schimp. ex Mull.Hal.) Magill var. breutelii indigenous
- Anacolia breutelii (Schimp. ex Mull.Hal.) Magill var. squarrifolia (Sim) Magill indigenous
- Andreaea acutifolia Hook.f. & Wilson, indigenous
- Andreaea alpina Hedw. indigenous
- Andreaea bistratosa Magill, indigenous
- Andreaea nitida Hook.f. & Wilson, indigenous
- Andreaea rupestris Hedw. indigenous
- Andreaea subulata Harv. indigenous
- Anoectangium wilmsianum (Mull.Hal.) Paris, indigenous
- Anomobryum drakensbergense Van Rooy, indigenous
- Anomobryum julaceum (Schrad. ex G.Gaertn., B.Mey. & Schreb.) Schimp. indigenous
- Anomodon pseudotristis (Mull.Hal.) Kindb. indigenous
- Aongstroemia filiformis (P.Beauv.) Wijk & Margad. indigenous
- Aongstroemia julacea (Hook.) Mitt. indigenous
- Archidium acanthophyllum Snider, indigenous
- Archidium amplexicaule Mull.Hal. indigenous
- Archidium andersonianum Snider, endemic
- Archidium capense Hornsch. indigenous
- Archidium julicaule Mull.Hal. indigenous
- Archidium microthecium Dixon & P.de la Varde, indigenous
- Archidium muellerianum Snider, indigenous
- Archidium ohioense Schimp. ex Mull.Hal. indigenous
- Archidium rehmannii Mitt. indigenous
- Archidium subulatum Mull.Hal. indigenous
- Astomiopsis magilliana Snider, K.L.Yip & J.R.Clark, endemic
- Atractylocarpus madagascariensis (Ther.) Padberg & J.-P.Frahm, indigenous
- Atrichum androgynum (Mull.Hal.) A.Jaeger, indigenous
- Aulacopilum trichophyllum Angstr. indigenous
- Barbula bolleana (Mull.Hal.) Broth. indigenous
- Barbula calycina Schwagr. indigenous
- Barbula convoluta Hedw. indigenous
- Barbula eubryum Mull.Hal. indigenous
- Barbula indica (Hook.) Spreng. indigenous
- Barbula microcalycina Magill, indigenous
- Barbula unguiculata Hedw. indigenous
- Bartramia aristaria Mull.Hal. indigenous
- Bartramia capensis (R.Br.) Wijk & Margad. indigenous
- Bartramia compacta Hornsch. indigenous
- Bartramia compacta Hornsch. var. compacta, indigenous
- Bartramia compacta Hornsch. var. macowaniana (Mull.Hal.) Magill, endemic
- Bartramia hampeana Mull.Hal. indigenous
- Brachymenium acuminatum Harv. indigenous
- Brachymenium chilense Ochi & Mahu, indigenous
- Brachymenium dicranoides (Hornsch.) A.Jaeger, indigenous
- Brachymenium leptophyllum (Bruch & Schimp. ex Mull.Hal.) Bruch & Schimp. ex A.Jaeger, indigenous
- Brachymenium nepalense Hook. indigenous
- Brachymenium pulchrum Hook. indigenous
- Brachymenium systylium (Mull.Hal.) A.Jaeger, indigenous
- Brachythecium implicatum (Hornsch. ex Mull.Hal.) A.Jaeger, indigenous
- Brachythecium pinnatum Dixon, endemic
- Brachythecium plumosum (Hedw.) Schimp. indigenous
- Brachythecium populeum (Hedw.) Schimp. indigenous
- Brachythecium pseudopopuleum (Schimp. ex Mull.Hal.) Schimp. endemic
- Brachythecium pseudovelutinum (Hampe ex Mull.Hal.) A.Jaeger, endemic
- Brachythecium ruderale (Brid.) W.R.Buck, indigenous
- Brachythecium salebrosum (Hoffm. ex F.Weber & D.Mohr) Schimp. indigenous
- Brachythecium subrutabulum (Mull.Hal.) A.Jaeger, indigenous
- Braunia secunda (Hook.) Bruch & Schimp. indigenous
- Breutelia diffracta Mitt. indigenous
- Breutelia elliptica Magill, endemic
- Breutelia microdonta (Mitt.) Broth. indigenous
- Breutelia substricta (Schimp.) Magill, indigenous
- Breutelia tabularis Dixon, endemic
- Brothera leana (Sull.) Mull.Hal. indigenous
- Bruchia brevipes Harv. ex Hook. indigenous
- Bruchia eckloniana Mull.Hal. indigenous
- Bryobartramia schelpei Hedd. indigenous
- Bryoerythrophyllum campylocarpum (Mull.Hal.) H.A.Crum, indigenous
- Bryoerythrophyllum recurvirostrum (Hedw.) P.C.Chen, indigenous
- Bryum alpinum Huds. ex With. indigenous
- Bryum andicola Hook. indigenous
- Bryum apiculatum Schwagr. indigenous
- Bryum argenteum Hedw. indigenous
- Bryum aubertii (Schwagr.) Brid. indigenous
- Bryum caespiticium Hedw. indigenous
- Bryum canariense Brid. indigenous
- Bryum capillare Hedw. indigenous
- Bryum cellulare Hook. indigenous
- Bryum dichotomum Hedw. indigenous
- Bryum donianum Grev. indigenous
- Bryum erythrocaulon (Schwagr.) Brid. indigenous
- Bryum pseudotriquetrum (Hedw.) G.Gaertn., B.Mey. & Scherb. indigenous
- Bryum pycnophyllum (Dixon) Mohamed, indigenous
- Bryum radiculosum Brid. indigenous
- Bryum rubens Mitt. indigenous
- Bryum ruderale Crundw. & Nyholm, indigenous
- Bryum subapiculatum Hampe, indigenous
- Bryum torquescens Bruch ex De Not. indigenous
- Bryum turbinatum (Hedw.) Turner, indigenous
- Bryum viguieri Ther. indigenous
- Bryum viridescens Welw. & Duby, indigenous
- Callicostella tristis (Mull.Hal.) Broth. indigenous
- Calymperes levyanum Besch. indigenous
- Calymperes pallidum Mitt. indigenous
- Calymperes tenerum Mull.Hal. indigenous
- Calyptrochaeta asplenioides (Brid.) Crosby, indigenous
- Campylopus acuminatus Mitt. indigenous
- Campylopus acuminatus Mitt. var. kirkii (Mitt.) J.-P.Frahm, indigenous
- Campylopus ampliretis (Mull.Hal.) Paris, indigenous
- Campylopus arctocarpus (Hornsch.) Mitt. indigenous
- Campylopus arctocarpus (Hornsch.) Mitt. subsp. madecassus (Besch.) J.-P.Frahm, indigenous
- Campylopus atroluteus (Mull.Hal.) Paris, indigenous
- Campylopus aureonitens (Mull.Hal.) A.Jaeger, indigenous
- Campylopus bartramiaceus (Mull.Hal.) Paris, indigenous
- Campylopus bequaertii Ther. & Naveau, indigenous
- Campylopus bewsii Sim, indigenous
- Campylopus bicolor (Hornsch. ex Mull.Hal.) Wilson subsp. atroluteus (Mull.Hal.) J.-P.Frahm, indigenous
- Campylopus cambouei Renauld & Cardot, indigenous
- Campylopus carolinae Grout, indigenous
- Campylopus catarractilis (Mull.Hal.) Paris, indigenous
- Campylopus chlorotrichus (Mull.Hal.) Paris, indigenous
- Campylopus clavatus (R.Br.) Wilson, indigenous
- Campylopus controversus (Hampe) A.Jaeger, indigenous
- Campylopus decaryi Ther. indigenous
- Campylopus delagoae (Mull.Hal.) Paris, indigenous
- Campylopus echinatus Rehmann ex Sim, indigenous
- Campylopus edwardsii Sim, indigenous
- Campylopus flaccidus Renauld & Cardot, indigenous
- Campylopus fragilis (Brid.) Bruch, Schimp. indigenous
- Campylopus griseolus (Mull.Hal.) Paris, indigenous
- Campylopus hensii Renauld & Cardot, indigenous
- Campylopus hildebrandtii (Mull.Hal.) A.Jaeger, indigenous
- Campylopus inchangae (Rehmann ex Mull.Hal.) Paris, indigenous
- Campylopus introflexus (Hedw.) Brid. indigenous
- Campylopus jamesonii (Hook.) A.Jaeger, indigenous
- Campylopus lepidophyllus (Mull.Hal.) A.Jaeger, indigenous
- Campylopus leptotrichaceus (Mull.Hal.) Paris, indigenous
- Campylopus longescens (Mull.Hal.) Paris, indigenous
- Campylopus nanophyllus Mull.Hal. ex Broth. indigenous
- Campylopus nivalis (Brid.) Brid. indigenous
- Campylopus pallidus Hook. & Wilson, indigenous
- Campylopus perpusillus Mitt. indigenous
- Campylopus pilifer Brid. indigenous
- Campylopus pilifer Brid. var. pilifer, indigenous
- Campylopus pilifer Brid. var. simii (Schelpe) J.-P.Frahm & Hedd. endemic
- Campylopus praetermissus J.-P.Frahm, indigenous
- Campylopus procerus (Mull.Hal.) Paris, indigenous
- Campylopus pseudobicolor Mull.Hal. ex Renauld & Cardot, indigenous
- Campylopus pseudojulaceus Sim, indigenous
- Campylopus pulvinatus (Mull.Hal.) Paris, indigenous
- Campylopus purpurascens Lorentz, indigenous
- Campylopus pyriformis (F.W.Schultz) Brid. indigenous
- Campylopus robillardei Besch. indigenous
- Campylopus savannarum (Mull.Hal.) Mitt. indigenous
- Campylopus simii Schelpe, indigenous
- Campylopus stenopelma (Mull.Hal.) Rehmann ex Paris, indigenous
- Campylopus thwaitesii (Mitt.) A.Jaeger, indigenous
- Campylopus trichodes Lorentz, indigenous
- Campylopus vesticaulis Mitt. indigenous
- Cardotiella secunda (Mull.Hal.) Vitt, endemic
- Catagonium nitens (Brid.) Cardot, indigenous
- Catagonium nitens (Brid.) Cardot subsp. maritimum (Hook.) S.H.Lin, indigenous
- Ceratodon purpureus (Hedw.) Brid. indigenous
- Ceratodon purpureus (Hedw.) Brid. subsp. stenocarpus (Bruch & Schimp. ex Mull.Hal.) Dixon, indigenous
- Chamaebryum pottioides Ther. & Dixon, indigenous
- Cheilothela chilensis (Mont.) Broth.
- Chenia leptophylla (Mull.Hal.) R.H.Zander
- Chenia ruigtevleia Hedd. & R.H.Zander, indigenous
- Chrysoblastella chilensis (Mont.) Reimers, indigenous
- Chryso-hypnum cavifolium (Dixon) Ochyra & Sharp, indigenous
- Cladophascum gymnomitrioides (Dixon) Dixon, indigenous
- Codonoblepharon menziesii Schwagr. indigenous
- Codonoblepharon microtheca (Dixon ex Malta) Matcham & O'Shea, indigenous
- Conostomum pentastichum (Brid.) Lindb. indigenous
- Conostomum tetragonum (Hedw.) Lindb. indigenous
- Cratoneuron filicinum (Hedw.) Spruce, indigenous
- Crossidium apiculatum Magill, indigenous
- Crossidium karoo R.H.Zander & Hedd. indigenous
- Crossidium spiralifolium Magill, indigenous
- Cryphaea exigua (Mull.Hal.) A.Jaeger, indigenous
- Cryphaea jamesonii N.P.Taylor, indigenous
- Cryphaea rutenbergii Mull.Hal. indigenous
- Cyclodictyon vallis-gratiae (Hampe ex Mull.Hal.) Kuntze, indigenous
- Cygnicollum immersum Fife & Magill, endemic
- Dicranella cardotii (R.Br.bis) Dixon, indigenous
- Dicranella hookeri (Mull.Hal.) Cardot, indigenous
- Dicranella rigida Dixon, endemic
- Dicranella subsubulata (Hampe ex Mull.Hal.) A.Jaeger, indigenous
- Dicranoloma billardieri (Brid.) Paris, indigenous
- Dicranoloma entabeniense Magill, endemic
- Dicranoweisia antarctica (Mull.Hal.) Paris, indigenous
- Didymodon australasii (Hook. & Grev.) R.H.Zander, indigenous
- Didymodon ceratodonteus (Mull.Hal.) Dixon, indigenous
- Didymodon tophaceopsis R.H.Zander, indigenous
- Didymodon tophaceus (Brid.) Lisa, indigenous
- Didymodon trivialis (Mull.Hal.) J.Guerra, endemic
- Didymodon umbrosus (Mull.Hal.) R.H.Zander, indigenous
- Didymodon xanthocarpus (Mull.Hal.) Magill, indigenous
- Dimerodontium africanum Mull.Hal. endemic
- Dimerodontium balansae Mull.Hal. indigenous
- Dimerodontium pellucidum (Schwagr.) Mitt. indigenous
- Distichium capillaceum (Hedw.) Bruch & Schimp. indigenous
- Distichophyllum mniifolium (Hornsch.) Sim, indigenous
- Distichophyllum mniifolium (Hornsch.) Sim var. mniifolium, indigenous
- Distichophyllum mniifolium (Hornsch.) Sim var. taylorii (Sim) Magill, endemic
- Ditrichum brachypodum (Mull.Hal.) Broth. indigenous
- Ditrichum difficile (Duby) M.Fleisch. indigenous
- Ditrichum punctulatum Mitt. indigenous
- Ditrichum strictum (Hook.f. & Wilson) Hampe, indigenous
- Drepanocladus hallii Broth. & Dixon, indigenous
- Drepanocladus polygamus (Schimp.) Hedenas, indigenous
- Drepanocladus sparsus Mull.Hal. indigenous
- Drepanophyllaria caudicaule Mull.Hal. endemic
- Eccremidium exiguum (Hook.f. & Wilson) Wilson, indigenous
- Ectropothecium brachycarpum (Dixon) Magill, endemic
- Ectropothecium perrotii Renauld & Cardot, indigenous
- Ectropothecium regulare (Brid.) A.Jaeger, indigenous
- Encalypta ciliata Hedw. indigenous
- Encalypta vulgaris Hedw. indigenous
- Entodon cymbifolius Wager & Dixon, indigenous
- Entodon dregeanus (Hornsch.) Mull.Hal. indigenous
- Entodon geminidens (Besch.) Paris, indigenous
- Entodon macropodus (Hedw.) Mull.Hal. indigenous
- Entodon natalensis Rehmann ex Mull.Hal. indigenous
- Entodon stereophylloides Broth. indigenous
- Entodontopsis nitens (Mitt.) W.R.Buck, indigenous
- Ephemerum capense Mull.Hal. indigenous
- Ephemerum diversifolium Mitt. endemic
- Ephemerum namaquense Magill, endemic
- Ephemerum rehmannii (Mull.Hal.) Broth. indigenous
- Erpodium beccarii Mull.Hal. indigenous
- Erpodium coronatum (Hook.f. & Wilson) Mitt. indigenous
- Erpodium coronatum (Hook.f. & Wilson) Mitt. subsp. transvaaliense (Broth. & Wager) Magill, indigenous
- Erpodium distichum Wager & Dixon, indigenous
- Erythrodontium squarrosum (Hampe) Paris, indigenous
- Erythrodontium subjulaceum (Mull.Hal.) Paris, indigenous
- Eurhynchiella zeyheri (Spreng. ex Mull.Hal.) M.Fleisch. indigenous
- Eustichia longirostris (Brid.) Brid. indigenous
- Fabronia abyssinica Mull.Hal. indigenous
- Fabronia breutelii Hampe, endemic
- Fabronia eckloniana Hampe, endemic
- Fabronia gueinzii Hampe, indigenous
- Fabronia leikipiae Mull.Hal. indigenous
- Fabronia perciliata Mull.Hal. endemic
- Fabronia pilifera Hornsch. indigenous
- Fabronia rehmannii Mull.Hal. indigenous
- Fabronia victoriae Dixon, indigenous
- Fabronia wageri Dixon, endemic
- Felipponea assimilis (Mull.Hal.) O'Shea
- Fissidens aciphyllus Dixon, endemic
- Fissidens asplenioides Hedw. indigenous
- Fissidens beckettii Mitt. indigenous
- Fissidens bogosicus Mull.Hal. indigenous
- Fissidens borgenii Hampe, indigenous
- Fissidens bryoides Hedw. indigenous
- Fissidens curvatus Hornsch. indigenous
- Fissidens curvatus Hornsch. var. curvatus, indigenous
- Fissidens enervis Sim, indigenous
- Fissidens erosulus (Mull.Hal.) Paris, indigenous
- Fissidens fasciculatus Hornsch. endemic
- Fissidens gladiolus Mitt. indigenous
- Fissidens glaucescens Hornsch.
- Fissidens hoeegii P.de la Varde
- Fissidens intramarginatus (Hampe) Mitt. indigenous
- Fissidens marginatus Schimp. ex Mull.Hal.
- Fissidens megalotis Schimp. & Mull.Hal. indigenous
- Fissidens megalotis Schimp. ex Mull.Hal. subsp. megalotis, indigenous
- Fissidens microandrogynus Dixon
- Fissidens nitens Rehmann
- Fissidens ovatus Brid. indigenous
- Fissidens palmifolius (P.Beauv.) Broth. indigenous
- Fissidens parvilimbatus Sim
- Fissidens plumosus Hornsch. indigenous
- Fissidens porrectus Mitt. indigenous
- Fissidens pseudoserratus (Mull.Hal.) A.Jaeger, indigenous
- Fissidens pygmaeus Hornsch. indigenous
- Fissidens rufescens Hornsch. indigenous
- Fissidens sciophyllus Mitt. indigenous
- Fissidens scleromitrius (Besch.) Broth. indigenous
- Fissidens simii Schelpe
- Fissidens splachnifolius Hornsch. indigenous
- Fissidens stellenboschianus Dixon
- Fissidens submarginatus Bruch, indigenous
- Fissidens subobtusatus Mull.Hal.
- Fissidens usambaricus Broth. indigenous
- Fissidens wageri Dixon, endemic
- Floribundaria floribunda (Dozy & Molk.) M.Fleisch. indigenous
- Fontinalis antipyretica Hedw. indigenous
- Fontinalis antipyretica Hedw. var. gracilis (Lindb.) Schimp. indigenous
- Fontinalis squamosa Hedw. indigenous
- Forsstroemia producta (Hornsch.) Paris, indigenous
- Funaria bergiana (Hornsch.) Broth. indigenous
- Funaria clavata (Mitt.) Magill, endemic
- Funaria hygrometrica Hedw. indigenous
- Funaria limbata (Mull.Hal.) Broth. indigenous
- Funaria longicollis Dixon, indigenous
- Funaria rhomboidea J.Shaw, indigenous
- Funaria rottleri (Schwagr.) Broth. indigenous
- Funaria spathulata Schimp. ex Mull.Hal. indigenous
- Funaria succuleata (Wager & C.H.Wright) Broth. ex Magill, indigenous
- Funaria urceolata (Mitt.) Magill, indigenous
- Gammiella ceylonensis (Broth.) B.C.Tan & W.R.Buck, indigenous
- Gemmabryum ruderale (Crundw. & Nyholm) J.R.Spence, indigenous
- Gigaspermum repens (Hook.) Lindb. indigenous
- Goniomitrium africanum (Mull.Hal.) Broth. indigenous
- Grimmia argyrotricha Mull.Hal. indigenous
- Grimmia donniana Sm. indigenous
- Grimmia elongata Kaulf. indigenous
- Grimmia fuscolutea Hook. indigenous
- Grimmia laevigata (Brid.) Brid. indigenous
- Grimmia longirostris Hook. indigenous
- Grimmia pulvinata (Hedw.) Sm. indigenous
- Grimmia reflexidens Mull.Hal. indigenous
- Grimmia sanii Greven, synonym
- Grimmia trichophylla Grev. indigenous
- Gymnostomum aeruginosum Sm. indigenous
- Gymnostomum bewsii Sim, indigenous
- Gymnostomum lingulatum Rehmann ex Sim, endemic
- Haplocladium angustifolium (Hampe & Mull.Hal.) Broth. indigenous
- Haplohymenium pseudotriste (Mull.Hal.) Broth. synonym
- Hedwigia ciliata (Hedw.) P.Beauv. indigenous
- Hedwigidium integrifolium (P.Beauv.) Dixon, indigenous
- Helicodontium lanceolatum (Hampe & Mull.Hal.) A.Jaeger, endemic
- Hennediella longipedunculata (Mull.Hal.) R.H.Zander, indigenous
- Herpetineuron toccoae (Sull. & Lesq.) Cardot, indigenous
- Holomitrium cylindraceum (P.Beauv.) Wijk & Margad. indigenous
- Holomitrium cylindraceum (P.Beauv.) Wijk & Margad. var. cucullatum (Besch.) Wijk & Margad. indigenous
- Hookeriopsis pappeana (Hampe) A.Jaeger, indigenous
- Hookeriopsis utacamundiana (Mont.) Broth. indigenous
- Hygroamblystegium caudicaule (Mull.Hal.) Broth. indigenous
- Hylocomiopsis cylindricarpa Ther. indigenous
- Hymenostylium recurvirostre (Hedw.) Dixon, indigenous
- Hyophila baginsensis Mull.Hal. indigenous
- Hyophila involuta (Hook.) A.Jaeger, indigenous
- Hypnum cupressiforme Hedw. indigenous
- Hypnum cupressiforme Hedw. var. cupressiforme, indigenous
- Hypnum cupressiforme Hedw. var. filiforme Brid. indigenous
- Hypnum cupressiforme Hedw. var. lacunosum Brid. indigenous
- Hypnum cupressiforme Hedw. var. mossmanianum (Mull.Hal.) Ando, indigenous
- Hypnum macrogynum Besch. indigenous
- Hypodontium dregei (Hornsch.) Mull.Hal. indigenous
- Hypodontium pomiforme (Hook.) Mull.Hal. indigenous
- Hypopterygium laricinum (Hook.) Brid. synonym
- Hypopterygium tamarisci (Sw.) Brid. ex Mull.Hal. indigenous
- Ischyrodon lepturus (Taylor) Schelpe, indigenous
- Isopterygium leucophanes (Hampe ex Mull.Hal.) A.Jaeger, indigenous
- Isopterygium leucopsis (Mull.Hal.) Paris, endemic
- Isopterygium punctulatum Broth. & Wager, endemic
- Isopterygium strangulatum (Hampe ex Mull.Hal.) Broth. endemic
- Isopterygium taxithellioides Broth. & Bryhn, endemic
- Isopterygium taylorii Sim, endemic
- Isopterygium tenerum (Hedw.) Mitt. indigenous
- Jaegerina stolonifera (Mull.Hal.) Mull.Hal. indigenous
- Juratzkaea incisa (W.R.Buck) Catches. & I.G.Stone, endemic
- Kindbergia praelonga (Hedw.) Ochyra, indigenous
- Lepidopilidium hanningtonii (Mitt.) Broth. indigenous
- Leptobryum pyriforme (Hedw.) Wilson, indigenous
- Leptodictyum riparium (Hedw.) Warnst. indigenous
- Leptodon smithii (Hedw.) F.Weber & D.Mohr, indigenous
- Leptodontium brachyphyllum Broth. & Ther. indigenous
- Leptodontium longicaule Mitt. indigenous
- Leptodontium pungens (Mitt.) Kindb. indigenous
- Leptodontium viticulosoides (P.Beauv.) Wijk & Margad. indigenous
- Leptoischyrodon congoanus Dixon, indigenous
- Leptophascum leptophyllum (Mull.Hal.) J.Guerra & Cano, indigenous
- Leptopterigynandrum austro-alpinum Mull.Hal. indigenous
- Leptopterigynandrum subintegrum (Mitt.) Broth. indigenous
- Leptotheca gaudichaudii Schwagr. indigenous
- Leptotrichella minuta (Hampe) Ochyra, indigenous
- Leskeella zuluensis Broth. & Bryhn, endemic
- Leucobryum acutifolium (Mitt.) Cardot, indigenous
- Leucobryum madagassum Besch. indigenous
- Leucobryum rehmannii Mull.Hal. endemic
- Leucodon assimilis (Mull.Hal.) A.Jaeger, synonym
- Leucoloma chrysobasilare (Mull.Hal.) A.Jaeger, indigenous
- Leucoloma chrysobasilare (Mull.Hal.) A.Jaeger subsp. africana La Farge, indigenous
- Leucoloma entabeniense (Magill) La Farge, endemic
- Leucoloma rehmannii (Mull.Hal.) Rehmann ex Paris, indigenous
- Leucoloma scabricuspis Broth. indigenous
- Leucoloma sprengelianum (Mull.Hal.) A.Jaeger, endemic
- Leucoloma syrrhopodontoides Broth. indigenous
- Leucoloma zeyheri (Mull.Hal.) Kindb. indigenous
- Leucoloma zuluense Broth. & Bryhn, indigenous
- Levierella neckeroides (Griff.) O'Shea & Matcham, indigenous
- Levierella perserrata P.de la Varde & J.-F.Leroy, endemic
- Lewinskya armata (Lewinsky & Van Rooy) F.Lara, Garilleti & Goffinet, endemic
- Lewinskya firma (Venturi) F.Lara, Garilleti & Goffinet, indigenous
- Lewinskya incurvomarginata (Lewinsky & Van Rooy) F.Lara, Garilleti & Goffinet, endemic
- Lewinskya rupestris (Schleich.) F.Lara, Garilleti & Goffinet, indigenous
- Lindbergia haplocladioides Dixon, indigenous
- Lindbergia patentifolia Dixon, indigenous
- Lindbergia pseudoleskeoides Dixon, indigenous
- Lindbergia viridis Dixon, indigenous
- Lopidium pennaeforme (Thunb. ex Brid.) M.Fleisch. endemic
- Lopidium struthiopteris (Brid.) M.Fleisch. indigenous
- Ludorugbya springbokorum Hedd. & R.H.Zander, endemic
- Macrocoma lycopodioides (Schwagr.) Vitt, indigenous
- Macrocoma pulchella (Hornsch.) Vitt, endemic
- Macrocoma tenuis (Hook. & Grev.) Vitt, indigenous
- Macrocoma tenuis (Hook. & Grev.) Vitt subsp. tenuis, indigenous
- Macromitrium lebomboense Van Rooy, endemic
- Macromitrium levatum Mitt. indigenous
- Macromitrium macropelma Mull.Hal. endemic
- Macromitrium microstomum (Hook. & Grev.) Schwagr. endemic
- Macromitrium richardii Schwagr. indigenous
- Macromitrium serpens (Bruch ex Hook. & Grev.) Brid. indigenous
- Macromitrium sulcatum (Hook.) Brid. indigenous
- Meiothecium fuscescens (A.Jaeger ex Paris) Broth. endemic
- Metzleria madagascariensis (Ther.) J.-P.Frahm, indigenous
- Microbryum davallianum (Sm.) R.H.Zander, indigenous
- Microbryum davallianum (Sm.) R.H.Zander var. conicum (Schleich. ex Schwagr.) R.H.Zander, endemic
- Microbryum rufochaete (Magill) R.H.Zander, endemic
- Microbryum subplanomarginatum (Dixon) R.H.Zander, indigenous
- Microcrossidium apiculatum (Magill) J.Guerra & Cano, endemic
- Micromitrium perexiguum (Mull.Hal.) Crosby, indigenous
- Micropoma niloticum (Delile) Lindb. indigenous
- Mielichhoferia bryoides (Harv.) Wijk & Margad. indigenous
- Mielichhoferia subnuda Sim, indigenous
- Mittenothamnium ctenidioides (Dixon) Schelpe, indigenous
- Mittenothamnium cygnicollum (Dixon) Wijk & Margad. indigenous
- Mittenothamnium horridulum (Broth.) Cardot, indigenous
- Mittenothamnium patens (Hampe) Cardot, indigenous
- Mittenothamnium pseudoreptans (Mull.Hal.) Cardot, indigenous
- Mittenothamnium reptans (Hedw.) Cardot, indigenous
- Neckera complanata (Hedw.) Huebener, indigenous
- Neckera valentiniana Besch. indigenous
- Nogopterium gracile (Hedw.) Crosby & W.R.Buck, indigenous
- Octoblepharum albidum Hedw. indigenous
- Oedipodiella australis (Wager & Dixon) Dixon, indigenous
- Oligotrichum afrolaevigatum (Dixon) G.L.Sm. indigenous
- Oligotrichum capense Schelpe & Fanshawe, indigenous
- Oligotrichum tetragonum Schelpe & Fanshawe, indigenous
- Oligotrichum wageri (Broth.) G.L.Sm. endemic
- Oreoweisia erosa (Hampe ex Mull.Hal.) Kindb. indigenous
- Orthodontium lineare Schwagr. indigenous
- Orthostichella pandurifolia (Mull.Hal.) W.R.Buck, indigenous
- Orthostichopsis pinnatella (Broth.) Broth. indigenous
- Orthostichopsis subimbricata (Hampe) Broth. indigenous
- Orthotrichum armatum Lewinsky & Van Rooy, endemic
- Orthotrichum diaphanum Brid. indigenous
- Orthotrichum firmum Venturi, indigenous
- Orthotrichum incurvomarginatum Lewinsky & Van Rooy, endemic
- Orthotrichum karoo F.Lara, Garilleti & Mazimpaka, indigenous
- Orthotrichum rupestre Schleich. ex Sim, indigenous
- Orthotrichum subexsertum Schimp. ex Mull.Hal. indigenous
- Orthotrichum transvaaliense Rehmann ex Sim, endemic
- Oxyrrhynchium confervoidum Sim, endemic
- Oxyrrhynchium subasperum Sim, endemic
- Palamocladium leskeoides (Hook.) E.Britton, indigenous
- Papillaria africana (Mull.Hal.) A.Jaeger, indigenous
- Pelekium ramusculosum (Mitt.) Touw, indigenous
- Pelekium varians (Welw. & Duby) Touw, indigenous
- Pelekium versicolor (Hornsch. ex Mull.Hal.) Touw, indigenous
- Phascum peraristatum Mull.Hal.
- Philonotis africana (Mull.Hal.) Rehmann ex Paris, indigenous
- Philonotis caespitosa Wilson ex Milde, indigenous
- Philonotis comosa (Broth.) D.G.Griffin & W.R.Buck, endemic
- Philonotis dregeana (Mull.Hal.) A.Jaeger, indigenous
- Philonotis falcata (Hook.) Mitt. indigenous
- Philonotis globosa (Mull.Hal.) D.G.Griffin & W.R.Buck, indigenous
- Philonotis hastata (Duby) Wijk & Margad. indigenous
- Philonotis scabrifolia (Hook.f. & Wilson) Braithw. indigenous
- Philonotis vagans (Hook.f. & Wilson) Mitt. indigenous
- Physcomitrellopsis africana Wager & Broth. ex Dixon, endemic
- Physcomitrium spathulatum Mull.Hal. indigenous
- Physcomitrium spathulatum Mull.Hal. var. sessile (J.Shaw) Magill, endemic
- Physcomitrium spathulatum Mull.Hal. var. spathulatum, indigenous
- Picobryum atomicum R.H.Zander & Hedd. indigenous
- Pilotrichella cuspidata Broth. synonym
- Pilotrichella kuntzei Mull.Hal. synonym
- Pilotrichella pandurifolia (Mull.Hal.) A.Jaeger, indigenous
- Pinnatella minuta (Mitt.) Broth. indigenous
- Plagiobryum zierii (Dicks. ex Hedw.) Lindb. indigenous
- Plagiomnium rhynchophorum (Hook.) T.J.Kop. indigenous
- Plagiomnium rhynchophorum (Hook.) T.J.Kop. var. reidii (Dixon) T.J.Kop. indigenous
- Plagiopus oederianus (Sw.) H.A.Crum & L.E.Anderson, indigenous
- Plagiothecium lamprostachys (Hampe) A.Jaeger, indigenous
- Plagiothecium membranosulum Mull.Hal. indigenous
- Plagiothecium rhynchostegioides Mull.Hal. synonym
- Platygyriella densa (Hook.) W.R.Buck, indigenous
- Platyhypnidium macowanianum (Paris) M.Fleisch. indigenous
- Platyneuron praealtum (Mitt.) Ochyra & Bednarek-Ochyra, indigenous
- Plaubelia involuta (Magill) R.H.Zander, indigenous
- Pleuridium ecklonii (Hampe ex Mitt.) Snider, indigenous
- Pleuridium nervosum (Hook.) Mitt. indigenous
- Pleuridium papillosum Magill, endemic
- Pleuridium pappeanum (Mull.Hal.) A.Jaeger, indigenous
- Pleuridium subulatum (Hedw.) Rabenh. indigenous
- Pogonatum belangeri (Mull.Hal.) A.Jaeger, indigenous
- Pogonatum borgenii (Hampe) A.Jaeger, endemic
- Pogonatum capense (Hampe) A.Jaeger, indigenous
- Pogonatum oligodus (Kunze ex Mull.Hal.) Mitt. synonym
- Pogonatum perichaetiale (Mont.) A.Jaeger, indigenous
- Pogonatum perichaetiale (Mont.) A.Jaeger subsp. oligodus (Kunze ex Mull.Hal.) Hyvonen, indigenous
- Pogonatum usambaricum (Broth.) Paris, indigenous
- Pohlia baronii Wijk & Margad. indigenous
- Pohlia cruda (Hedw.) Lindb. indigenous
- Pohlia elongata Hedw. indigenous
- Pohlia integra (Cardot) A.J.Shaw, synonym
- Pohlia nutans (Hedw.) Lindb. indigenous
- Polytrichastrum formosum (Hedw.) G.L.Sm. indigenous
- Polytrichum commune Hedw. indigenous
- Polytrichum juniperinum Hedw. indigenous
- Polytrichum piliferum Hedw. indigenous
- Polytrichum subformosum Besch. indigenous
- Polytrichum subpilosum P.Beauv. indigenous
- Porothamnium stipitatum (Mitt.) Touw ex De Sloover, indigenous
- Porotrichum elongatum (Welw. & Duby) A.Gepp, indigenous
- Porotrichum madagassum Kiaer ex Besch. indigenous
- Porotrichum stipitatum (Mitt.) W.R.Buck, indigenous
- Porotrichum usagarum Mitt. indigenous
- Pottia namaquensis Magill, endemic
- Pottia splachnoides (Hornsch.) Broth. indigenous
- Prionodon densus (Sw. ex Hedw.) Mull.Hal. indigenous
- Pseudocrossidium adustum (Mitt.) M.J.Cano, indigenous
- Pseudocrossidium crinitum (Schultz) R.H.Zander, indigenous
- Pseudocrossidium hornschuchianum (Schultz) R.H.Zander, indigenous
- Pseudocrossidium porphyreoneurum (Mull.Hal.) R.H.Zander, indigenous
- Pseudocrossidium replicatum (Taylor) R.H.Zander, indigenous
- Pseudoleskea leskeoides (Paris) Mull.Hal. indigenous
- Pseudoleskeopsis claviramea (Mull.Hal.) Ther. indigenous
- Pseudoleskeopsis pseudoattenuata (Mull.Hal.) Ther. indigenous
- Pseudoleskeopsis unilateralis Dixon, endemic
- Pseudoscleropodium purum (Hedw.) M.Fleisch. indigenous
- Pseudosymblepharis angustata (Mitt.) Hilp. indigenous
- Pterobryopsis acutifolium (Brid.) Magill, indigenous
- Pterobryopsis hoehnelii (Mull.Hal.) Mull.Hal. indigenous
- Pterobryopsis rehmannii Magill, endemic
- Pterogoniadelphus assimilis (Mull.Hal.) Ochyra & Zijlstra, indigenous
- Pterogonium gracile (Hedw.) Sm. indigenous
- Pterygoneurum macleanum Warnst. indigenous
- Ptychomitriopsis africana Dixon, endemic
- Ptychomitriopsis aloinoides Magill, indigenous
- Ptychomitrium crassinervium (Mull.Hal.) Schimp. ex Paris, indigenous
- Ptychomitrium crispatum (Hedw.) A.Jaeger, indigenous
- Ptychomitrium cucullatifolium (Mull.Hal.) A.Jaeger, indigenous
- Ptychomitrium depressum (Mull.Hal.) Paris, synonym
- Ptychomitrium diexaratum Magill, indigenous
- Ptychomitrium eurybasis Dixon, endemic
- Ptychomitrium exaratifolium H.Rob. indigenous
- Ptychomitrium muelleri (Mitt.) A.Jaeger, indigenous
- Ptychomitrium sellowianum (Mull.Hal.) A.Jaeger, indigenous
- Ptychomitrium subcrispatum Ther. & P.de la Varde, indigenous
- Pyrrhobryum spiniforme (Hedw.) Mitt. indigenous
- Pyrrhobryum vallis-gratiae (Hampe ex Mull.Hal.) Manuel, endemic
- Quathlamba debilicostata Magill, indigenous
- Racomitrium crispipilum (Taylor) A.Jaeger, indigenous
- Racomitrium crispulum (Hook.f. & Wilson) Hook.f. & Wilson, indigenous
- Racomitrium lamprocarpum (Mull.Hal.) A.Jaeger, indigenous
- Racomitrium lanuginosum (Hedw.) Brid. indigenous
- Racopilum capense Mull.Hal. ex Broth. indigenous
- Rauiella praelonga (Schimp. ex Besch.) Wijk & Margad. indigenous
- Rhabdoweisia crispata (Dicks. ex With.) Lindb. indigenous
- Rhabdoweisia fugax (Hedw.) Bruch & Schimp. indigenous
- Rhachithecium perpusillum (Thwaites & Mitt.) Broth. indigenous
- Rhacocarpus purpurascens (Brid.) Paris, indigenous
- Rhacopilopsis flexilis (Renauld & Cardot) W.R.Buck, synonym
- Rhacopilopsis transvaaliensis (Ther. & Dixon) W.R.Buck, synonym
- Rhacopilopsis trinitensis (Mull.Hal.) E.Britton & Dixon, indigenous
- Rhacopilopsis variegata (Welw. & Duby) M.C.Watling & O'Shea, indigenous
- Rhodobryum commersonii (Schwagr.) Paris, indigenous
- Rhodobryum keniae (Mull.Hal.) Broth. indigenous
- Rhodobryum roseum (Hedw.) Limpr. indigenous
- Rhodobryum umbraculum (Bruch ex Hook.) Schimp. ex Paris, indigenous
- Rhynchostegiella holstii (Broth.) Broth. indigenous
- Rhynchostegiella litorea (De Not.) Limpr. indigenous
- Rhynchostegiella sublaevipes Broth. & Bryhn, endemic
- Rhynchostegiella zeyheri (Spreng. ex Mull.Hal.) Broth. indigenous
- Rhynchostegium brachypterum (Hornsch.) A.Jaeger, indigenous
- Rhynchostegium raphidorrhynchum (Mull.Hal.) A.Jaeger, indigenous
- Rhynchostegium subbrachypterum Broth. & Bryhn, endemic
- Rigodium toxarion (Schwagr.) A.Jaeger, indigenous
- Rosulabryum capillare (Hedw.) J.R.Spence, indigenous
- Rosulabryum rubens (Mitt.) J.R.Spence, indigenous
- Saelania glaucescens (Hedw.) Broth. indigenous
- Sanionia uncinata (Hedw.) Loeske, indigenous
- Schistidium apocarpum (Hedw.) Bruch & Schimp. indigenous
- Schlotheimia ferruginea (Bruch ex Hook. & Grev.) Brid. indigenous
- Schlotheimia percuspidata Mull.Hal. indigenous
- Schlotheimia rufopallens Mull.Hal. endemic
- Schoenobryum concavifolium (Griff.) Gangulee, indigenous
- Schoenobryum welwitschii (Duby) Manuel, endemic
- Scopelophila cataractae (Mitt.) Broth. indigenous
- Sematophyllum brachycarpum (Hampe) Broth. indigenous
- Sematophyllum dregei (Mull.Hal.) Magill, indigenous
- Sematophyllum gueinzii (Hampe) Magill, indigenous
- Sematophyllum magillianum P.E.A.S.Câmara & Van Rooy, indigenous
- Sematophyllum sphaeropyxis (Mull.Hal.) Broth. indigenous
- Sematophyllum subpinnatum (Brid.) E.Britton, indigenous
- Sematophyllum wageri C.H.Wright ex Wager, indigenous
- Sematophyllum zuluense (Sim) Magill, endemic
- Sphaerothecium subchlorophyllosum (Mull.Hal.) J.-P.Frahm, indigenous
- Sphagnum africanum Welw. & Duby, indigenous
- Sphagnum capense Hornsch. indigenous
- Sphagnum fimbriatum Wilson, indigenous
- Sphagnum perichaetiale Hampe, indigenous
- Sphagnum pycnocladulum Mull.Hal. indigenous
- Sphagnum strictum Sull. indigenous
- Sphagnum strictum Sull. subsp. pappeanum (Mull.Hal.) A.Eddy, indigenous
- Sphagnum truncatum Hornsch. indigenous
- Sphagnum violascens Mull.Hal. indigenous
- Squamidium brasiliense (Hornsch.) Broth. indigenous
- Stereophyllum natalense Sim, synonym
- Stereophyllum odontocalyx (Mull.Hal.) A.Jaeger, synonym
- Stereophyllum radiculosum (Hook.) Mitt. indigenous
- Stereophyllum woodii (Sim) Magill, indigenous
- Stoneobryum mirum (Lewinsky) D.H.Norris & H.Rob. endemic
- Streptocalypta pulchriretis (Dixon) R.H.Zander, endemic
- Streptopogon erythrodontus (Taylor) Wilson, indigenous
- Streptopogon erythrodontus (Taylor) Wilson var. rutenbergii (Mull.Hal.) E.S.Salmon, synonym
- Syntrichia ammonsiana (H.A.Crum & L.E.Anderson) Ochyra, indigenous
- Syntrichia amphidiacea (Mull.Hal.) R.H.Zander, endemic
- Syntrichia antarctica (Hampe) R.H.Zander, indigenous
- Syntrichia austro-africana (W.A.Kramer) R.H.Zander, indigenous
- Syntrichia chisosa (Magill, Delgad. & L.R.Stark) R.H.Zander, indigenous
- Syntrichia fragilis (Taylor) Ochyra, indigenous
- Syntrichia laevipila Brid. indigenous
- Syntrichia leucostega (Mull.Hal.) R.H.Zander, indigenous
- Syntrichia leucostega (Mull.Hal.) R.H.Zander var. leucostega, indigenous
- Syntrichia leucostega (Mull.Hal.) R.H.Zander var. trachyneura (Dixon) R.H.Zander, endemic
- Syntrichia magilliana L.E.Anderson, endemic
- Syntrichia norvegica F.Weber, indigenous
- Syntrichia norvegica F.Weber var. norvegica, indigenous
- Syntrichia pagorum (Milde) J.J.Amann, indigenous
- Syntrichia papillosa (Wilson) Jur. indigenous
- Syntrichia princeps (De Not.) Mitt. indigenous
- Syntrichia rubella (Hook. & Wilson) R.H.Zander, indigenous
- Syntrichia ruralis (Hedw.) F.Weber & Mohr, indigenous
- Syrrhopodon asper Mitt. indigenous
- Syrrhopodon gaudichaudii Mont. indigenous
- Tayloria isleana (Besch.) Broth. indigenous
- Tayloria orthodonta (P.Beauv.) Wijk & Margad. indigenous
- Tetrapterum tetragonum (Hook.) A.L.Andrews, endemic
- Thamniopsis utacamundiana (Mont.) W.R.Buck, indigenous
- Thuidium assimile (Mitt.) A.Jaeger, indigenous
- Thuidium matarumense Besch. indigenous
- Timmiella pelindaba Magill indigenous
- Tortella fragilis (Hook. & Wilson) Limpr. indigenous
- Tortella humilis (Hedw.) Jenn. indigenous
- Tortella xanthocarpa (Schimp. ex Mull.Hal.) Broth. indigenous
- Tortula atrovirens (Sm.) Lindb. indigenous
- Tortula austro-africana W.A.Kramer, synonym
- Tortula bogosica (Mull.Hal.) R.H.Zander, indigenous
- Tortula muralis Hedw. indigenous
- Tortula splachnoides (Hornsch.) R.H.Zander, indigenous
- Trachypodopsis serrulata (P.Beauv.) M.Fleisch. indigenous
- Trachypus bicolor Reinw. & Hornsch. indigenous
- Trachypus bicolor Reinw. & Hornsch. var. viridulus (Mitt.) Zanten, indigenous
- Trematodon divaricatus Bruch, indigenous
- Trematodon intermedius Welw. & Duby, indigenous
- Trematodon longicollis Michx. indigenous
- Trematodon mayottensis Besch. indigenous
- Trematodon paradoxus Hornsch. indigenous
- Trematodon pillansii Dixon, endemic
- Trichosteleum perchlorosum Broth. & Bryhn, indigenous
- Trichostomum brachydontium Bruch, indigenous
- Trichostomum tenuirostre (Hook. & Taylor) Lindb. indigenous
- Trichostomum unguiculatum (Mitt.) R.H.Zander, indigenous
- Triquetrella mxinwana Hedd. & R.H.Zander, endemic
- Triquetrella tristicha (Mull.Hal.) Mull.Hal. indigenous
- Tristichium mirabile (Mull.Hal.) Herzog, indigenous
- Ulota ecklonii (Hornsch.) A.Jaeger, endemic
- Vesicularia galerulata (Duby) Broth. indigenous
- Vittia pachyloma (Mont.) Ochyra, indigenous
- Vrolijkheidia circumscissa Hedd. & R.H.Zander, synonym
- Vrolijkheidia peraristata (Mull.Hal.) R.H.Zander & Hedd. indigenous
- Wardia hygrometrica Harv. & Hook. endemic
- Weisiopsis plicata (Mitt.) Broth. indigenous
- Weissia controversa Hedw. indigenous
- Weissia cucullata Mull.Hal. endemic
- Weissia dieterlenii Ther. indigenous
- Weissia humicola Mull.Hal. indigenous
- Weissia latiuscula Mull.Hal. indigenous
- Wijkia trichocolea (Mull.Hal.) H.A.Crum, indigenous
- Zygodon corralensis Lorentz, indigenous
- Zygodon dixonii Sim, indigenous
- Zygodon erosus Mitt. indigenous
- Zygodon hookeri Hampe, indigenous
- Zygodon hookeri Hampe var. leptobolax (Mull.Hal.) Calabrese, endemic
- Zygodon intermedius Bruch & Schimp. indigenous
- Zygodon leptobolax Mull.Hal. endemic
- Zygodon runcinatus Mull.Hal. indigenous
- Zygodon trichomitrius Hook. & Wilson, indigenous

== See also ==
- Biodiversity of South Africa#Plants – Variety of life within South Africa and its exclusive economic zone
- List of conifers of South Africa – Plants of the class Pinophyta recorded from South Africa
- List of cycads of South Africa – Seed producing vascular plants of the division Cycadophyta recorded from South Africa
- Lists of flowering plants of South Africa – List of lists of flowering plants recorded from South Africa
- List of hornworts of South Africa – Non-vascular spore-bearing plants in the division Anthocerotophyta recorded from South Africa
- List of liverworts of South Africa – Non-vascular land plants with a gametophyte-dominant life cycle recorded from South Africa
- List of lycophytes of South Africa – Spore bearing vascular plants of the division Lycopodiophyta recorded from South Africa
- List of pteridophytes of South Africa – Spore-bearing vascular plants recorded from South Africa
