= Acalolepta tincturata =

Scientific classification
- Domain: Eukaryota
- Kingdom: Animalia
- Phylum: Arthropoda
- Class: Insecta
- Order: Coleoptera
- Suborder: Polyphaga
- Infraorder: Cucujiformia
- Family: Cerambycidae
- Tribe: Lamiini
- Genus: Acalolepta
- Species: A. tincturata

Binomial name
- Acalolepta tincturata (Pascoe, 1866)

Synonyms
- Dihammus tincturatus (Pascoe) Breuning, 1936; Monohammus tincturatus Pascoe, 1866

Species of beetle

Acalolepta tincturata is a species of beetle in the family Cerambycidae. It was described by Francis Polkinghorne Pascoe in 1866. It is known from Papua New Guinea and Indonesia. It feeds on Hevea brasiliensis, Pinus patula, Spathodea campanulata, Araucaria cunninghamii, and Plumeria acutifolia.
