= List of hornworts of South Africa =

Hornworts are a group of non-vascular plants constituting the division Anthocerotophyta. The common name refers to the elongated horn-like structure, which is the sporophyte. As in mosses and liverworts, the flattened, green plant body of a hornwort is the gametophyte plant.

Hornworts may be found worldwide, though they tend to grow only in places that are damp or humid. Some species grow in large numbers as tiny weeds in the soil of gardens and cultivated fields. The total number of species is still uncertain. While there are more than 300 published species names, the actual number could be as low as 100–150 species.

23,420 species of vascular plant have been recorded in South Africa, making it the sixth most species-rich country in the world and the most species-rich country on the African continent. Of these, 153 species are considered to be threatened. Nine biomes have been described in South Africa: Fynbos, Succulent Karoo, desert, Nama Karoo, grassland, savanna, Albany thickets, the Indian Ocean coastal belt, and forests.

The 2018 South African National Biodiversity Institute's National Biodiversity Assessment plant checklist lists 35,130 taxa in the phyla Anthocerotophyta (hornworts (6)), Anthophyta (flowering plants(33534)), Bryophyta (mosses (685)), Cycadophyta (cycads (42)), Lycopodiophyta (Lycophytes(45)), Marchantiophyta (liverworts (376)), Pinophyta (conifers (33)), and Pteridophyta {cryptograms(408)).

== Listing ==
- Anthoceros dimorphus Sim, indigenous
- Anthoceros natalensis Steph. indigenous
- Phaeoceros bolusii (Sim) S.W.Arnell, indigenous
- Phaeoceros carolinianus (Michx.) Prosk. indigenous
- Phaeoceros fulvisporus (Steph.) J.Haseg. indigenous
- Phaeoceros minutus (Mitt.) S.W.Arnell, indigenous

== See also ==
- Biodiversity of South Africa#Plants – Variety of life within South Africa and its exclusive economic zone
- List of conifers of South Africa – Plants of the class Pinophyta recorded from South Africa
- List of cycads of South Africa – Seed producing vascular plants of the division Cycadophyta recorded from South Africa
- Lists of flowering plants of South Africa – List of lists of flowering plants recorded from South Africa
- List of liverworts of South Africa – Non-vascular land plants with a gametophyte-dominant life cycle recorded from South Africa
- List of lycophytes of South Africa – Spore bearing vascular plants of the division Lycopodiophyta recorded from South Africa
- List of mosses of South Africa – Small, non-vascular flowerless plants recorded from South Africa
- List of pteridophytes of South Africa – Spore-bearing vascular plants recorded from South Africa
