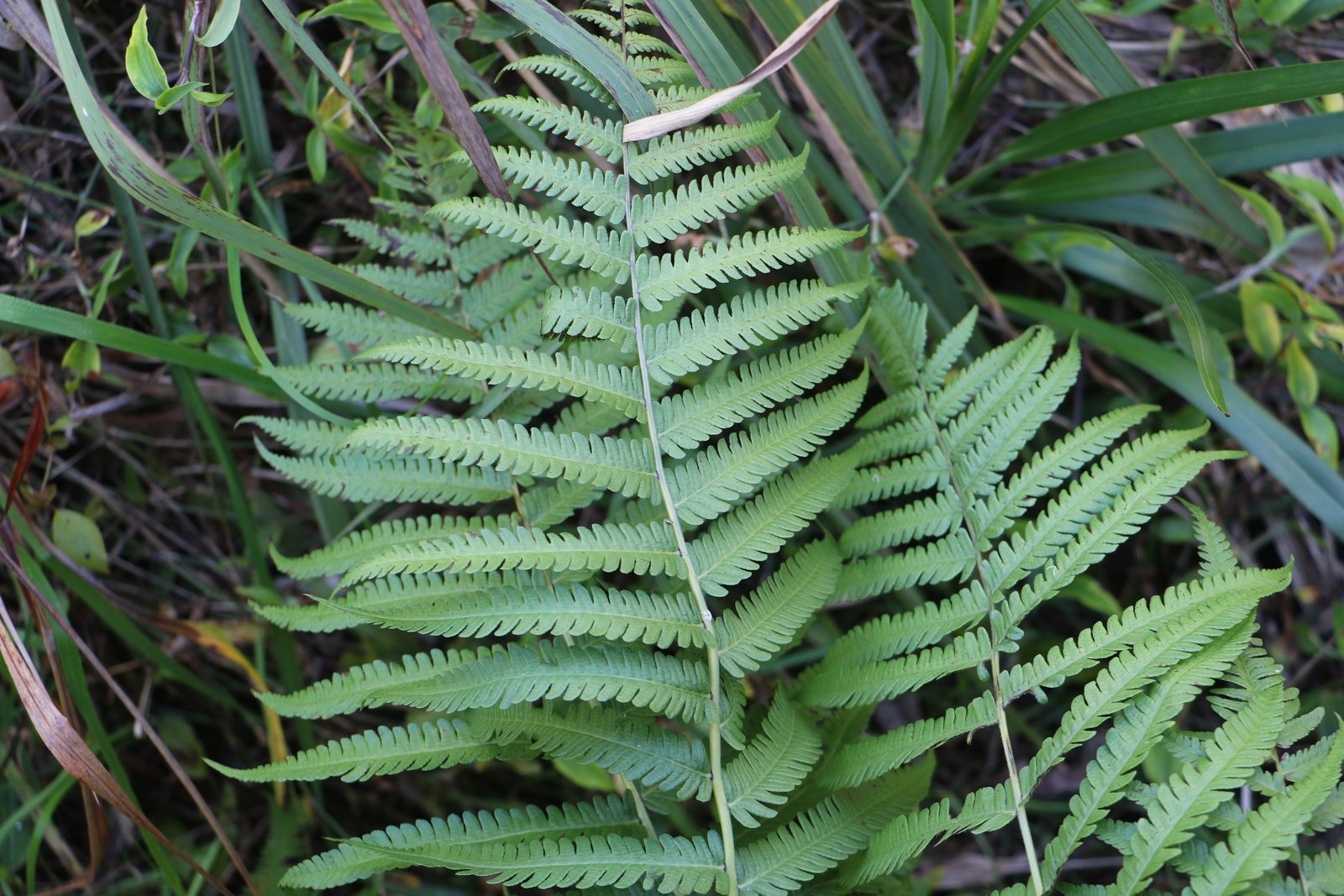

Scientific classification
- Kingdom: Plantae
- Clade: Embryophytes
- Clade: Tracheophytes
- Division: Polypodiophyta
- Class: Polypodiopsida
- Order: Polypodiales
- Suborder: Aspleniineae
- Family: Thelypteridaceae
- Genus: Christella
- Species: C. hispidula

Binomial name
- Christella hispidula (Decne.) Holttum.

Synonyms
- Thelypteris hispidula (Decne.) C.F.Reed; Cyclosorus quadrangularis (Fée)

= Christella hispidula =

Species of fern

Christella hispidula is a species of polypod fern in the Thelypteridaceae family.
