= Asplenium aequibasis =

Conservation status
- Least Concern (IUCN 3.1)

Scientific classification
- Kingdom: Plantae
- Clade: Tracheophytes
- Division: Polypodiophyta
- Class: Polypodiopsida
- Order: Polypodiales
- Suborder: Aspleniineae
- Family: Aspleniaceae
- Genus: Asplenium
- Species: A. aequibasis

Binomial name
- Asplenium aequibasis (C.Chr.) J.P.Roux

Synonyms
- Asplenium erectum Bory ex Willd. var. aequibasis C.Chr.

Species of fern in the spleenwort family

Asplenium aequibasis is a species of fern in the family Aspleniaceae. It is found in Tristan da Cunha. Its natural habitat is subantarctic shrubland.
