= Isoetes stellenbossiensis =

Conservation status
- Near Threatened (IUCN 3.1)

Scientific classification
- Kingdom: Plantae
- Clade: Tracheophytes
- Clade: Lycophytes
- Class: Lycopodiopsida
- Order: Isoetales
- Family: Isoetaceae
- Genus: Isoetes
- Species: I. stellenbossiensis

Binomial name
- Isoetes stellenbossiensis A.V.Duthie

South African endemic quillwort species

Isoetes stellenbossiensis, the Stellenbosch quillwort or Cape Flats quillwort, is a species of plant from South Africa.

== Description ==
This tufted geophyte has three-pointed scales. There are between five and thirty three spore bearing leaves, each of which grows up to 12 cm (4.7 in) long. This is the smallest Isoetes species in the region. The leaves have three well-developed groups of supporting tissue inside, giving them a firm texture. The air canals are poorly developed, with the adaxial canal ending 2 cm (0.79 in) before the end of the leaf. Each leaf has a small and delicate elongated appendage at its base. It starts off triangular, but often decays somewhat over time.

The sporangia vary in size and do not have a membranous covering. They are usually bordered by a narrow rim, with some of the cells being noticeably thicker and a yellowish-brown in colour. The older megasporangia are usually circular while the younger megasporangia are more elongated. The microsporangia have conspicuous gaps. The innermost micropsorangia are often angled due to pressure that has been exerted on them.

While the species in this genus typically have white spores, those of Isoetes stellenbossiensis have a distinctive greenish tinge and become darker when exposed to water. The megaspores are spherical and have a diameter of 0.45–0.59 mm (0.018–0.023 in). The microspores are more brownish than the megaspores and have a length of 0.032–0.036 mm (0.0013–0.0014 in) of and breadth of 0.016–0.024 mm (0.00063–0.00094 in).

A three-lobed corm remains during the dry season. It has a diameter of about 1.5 cm (0.59 in) and have a harsh texture. They are protected by black bud scales with three horny, prong-like teeth. They tend to be buried at a uite deeply, up to a depth of at least 6 cm (2.4 in). The corm is covered in caps of old cortex, each of which will remain for several years. They are difficult to remove, even if the corm has been soaked.

== Distribution and habitat ==
This quillwort is found growing in the Western Cape of South Africa - between Tulbagh, the Cape Flats and Stellenbosch - at an altitude of up to 300 m (980 ft). It is sometimes also found in the parts of the Northern Cape that border the Western Cape, although it has also been suggested that this might be a new species. It grows on waterlogged soils and seeps on granite outcrops.

== Etymology ==
The species is named after the Stellenbosch flats where it was first discovered.

== Ecology ==
This quillwort can form large colonies of thousands of individuals when conditions are suitable. In fact, in some places they may grow so densely that they may be mistaken for a fine-leafed grass. It can still, however, still be difficult to find these plants as they are small and often associate with other species. These species include the shrub Psoralea pinnata as well as multiple species of grasses, sedges and geophytes.

This is a seasonal species. Plants die off as its habitat dries, leaving behind a corm. This species has the highest tolerance to a low moisture environment of the South African Isoetes species, and is able to be fully terrestrial during the rainy season. It may even be found growing with highly drought tolerant species such as Crassula undulata, Aristea africana, and Oedera fruticosa.

== Conservation ==
In an assessment conducted in 2006, the IUCN classified this species as near threatened. It is, however, probably the most common Isoetes species in South Africa. An assessment conducted by the South African National Biodiversity Institute in 2020 classified this species as least concern as, while this species was still declining, the assessors believed that the population was still common enough with large enough subpopulations to not be at immediate risk of extinction.
