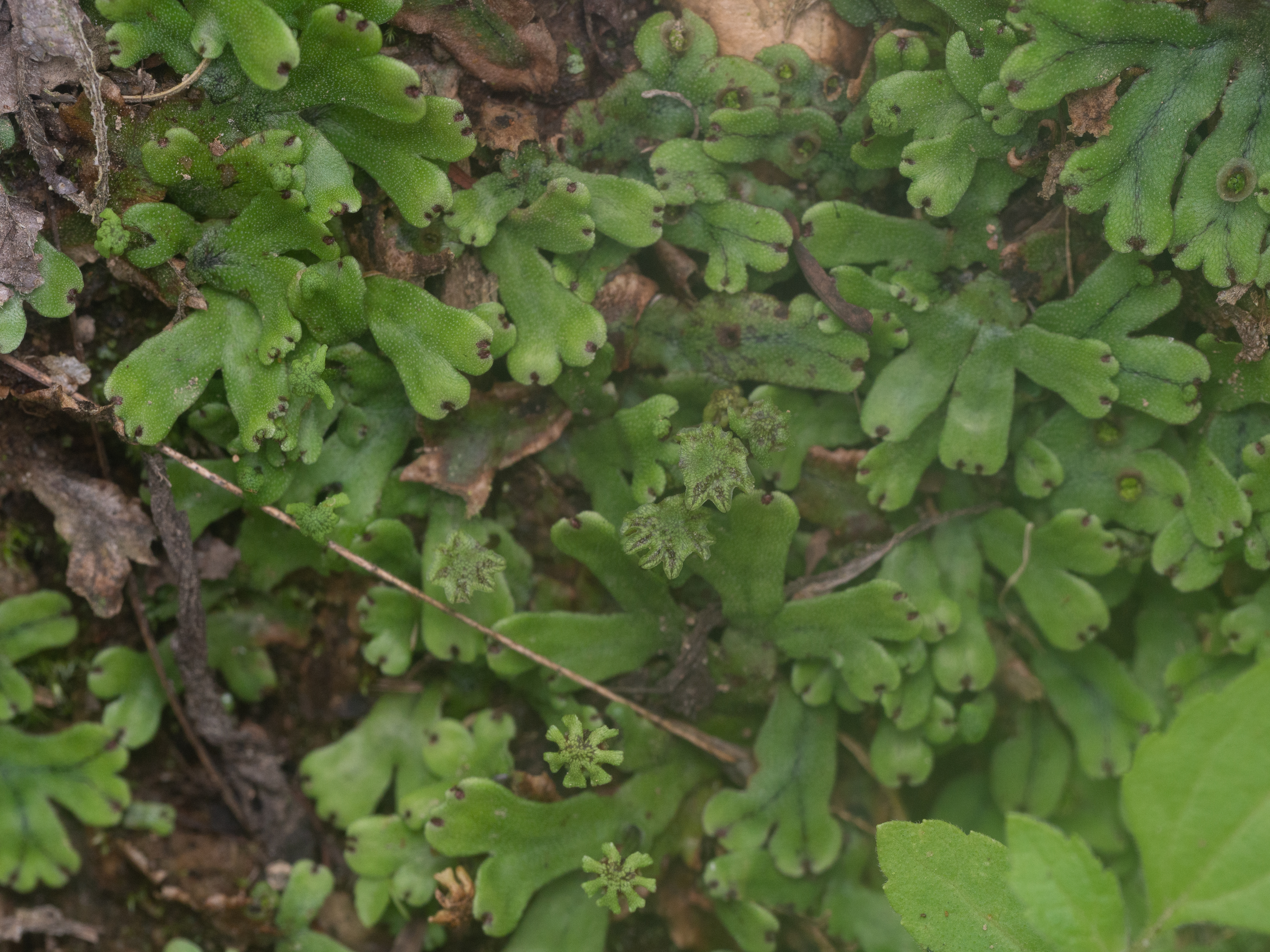

Scientific classification
- Kingdom: Plantae
- Clade: Embryophytes
- Division: Marchantiophyta
- Class: Marchantiopsida
- Order: Marchantiales
- Family: Marchantiaceae
- Genus: Marchantia
- Species: M. paleacea

Binomial name
- Marchantia paleacea Bertol.

= Marchantia paleacea =

Species of plant

Marchantia paleacea is a species of liverwort found in North America, Europe, and eastern Asia. It has been employed as a model organism to study plant-fungal symbioses.
