= Cephalozia connivens =

Scientific classification
- Kingdom: Plantae
- Division: Marchantiophyta
- Class: Jungermanniopsida
- Order: Lophoziales
- Family: Cephaloziaceae
- Genus: Cephalozia
- Species: C. connivens

Binomial name
- Cephalozia connivens (Dicks.) Lindb.

Species of moss

Cephalozia connivens is a species of liverwort belonging to the family Cephaloziaceae.

Synonym:

- Cephalozia connivens var. connivens
- Jungermannia connivens Dicks.
