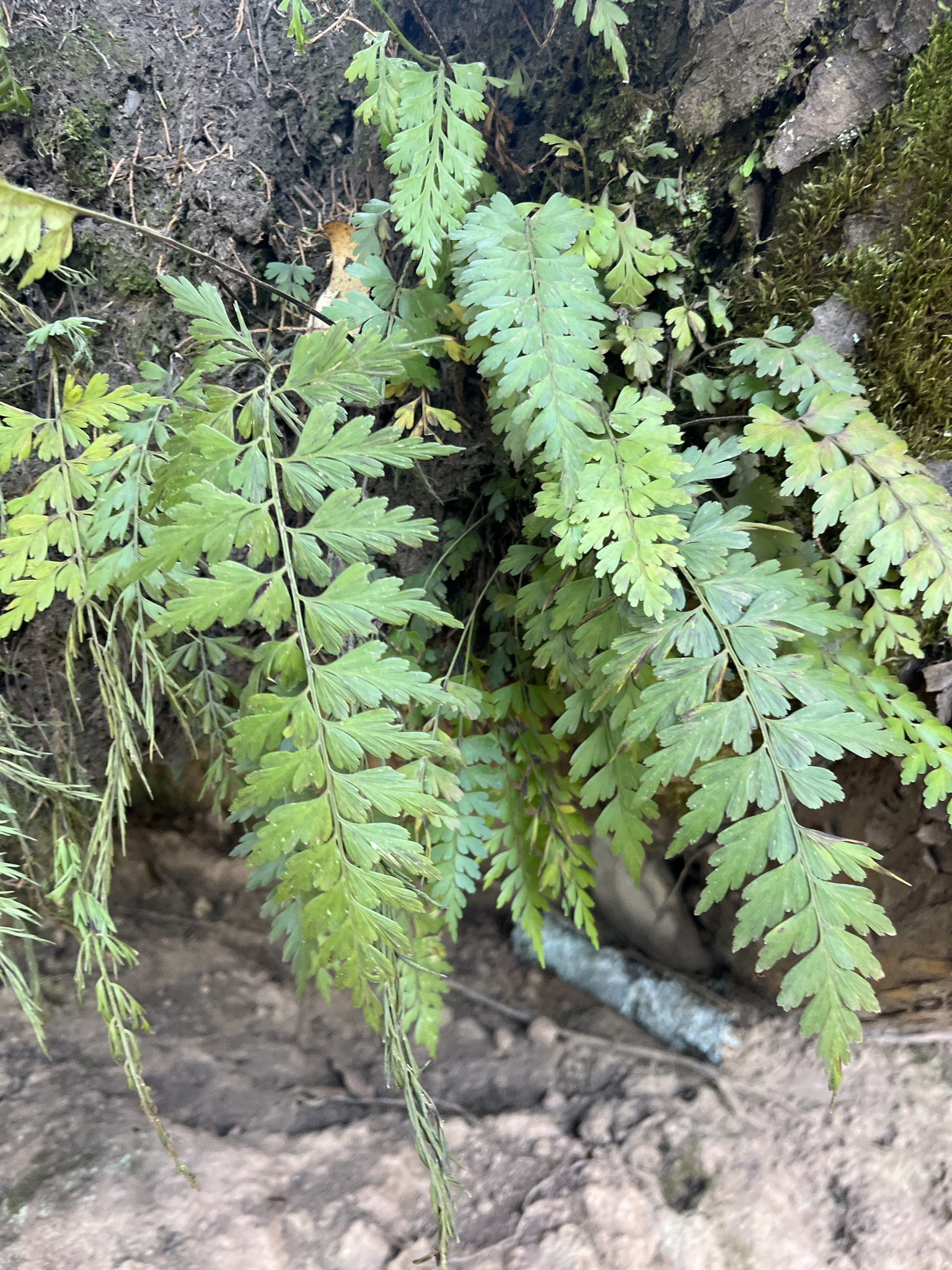

Conservation status
- Vulnerable (IUCN 3.1)

Scientific classification
- Kingdom: Plantae
- Clade: Embryophytes
- Clade: Tracheophytes
- Division: Polypodiophyta
- Class: Polypodiopsida
- Order: Polypodiales
- Suborder: Aspleniineae
- Family: Aspleniaceae
- Genus: Asplenium
- Species: A. aethiopicum

Binomial name
- Asplenium aethiopicum (Burm.f.) Bech.

Subspecies
- Asplenium aethiopicum subsp. aethiopicum; Asplenium aethiopicum subsp. filare (Forssk.) A.F.Braithw.; Asplenium aethiopicum subsp. tripinnatum (Baker) A.F.Braithw.

Synonyms
- subsp. aethiopicum: Trichomanes adiantoides L.; Trichomanes aethiopicum Burm.f.; Asplenium lanceolatum Forssk.; Asplenium adiantoides (L.) Lam.; Asplenium falsum Retz.; Asplenium furcatum Thunb.; Asplenium fragrans Schkuhr; Asplenium cultratum Gaudich.; Asplenium denticulatum Blume; Asplenium hirsutum B.Heyne; Asplenium tripartitum Blume; Asplenium cuneatum Hook. & Grev.; Asplenium furcatum f. platyphyllum Kunze; Asplenium nigricans Kunze; Asplenium dentex Kunze; Tarachia browniana C.Presl; Tarachia furcata (Thunb.) C.Presl; Tarachia furcata var. platyphylla C.Presl; Tarachia nigricans (Kunze) C.Presl; Asplenium praemorsum var. furcatum (Thunb.) T.Moore; Asplenium vinsonii Cordem.; Asplenium adiantoides (L.) C.Chr.; Asplenium rhipidoneuron W.J.Rob.; Asplenium praemorsum var. angustitripinnatum Bonap.; Chamaefilix adiantoides (L.) Farw.; Tarachia adiantoides (L.) Nakai ex Tuyama; Asplenium aemilii-guineae Alston; subsp. filare: Acrostichum filare Forssk.; Chamaefilix filaris (Forssk.) Farw.; Asplenium filare (Forssk.) Alston; subsp. tripinnatum: Asplenium furcatum var. tripinnatum Baker; Asplenium tripinnatum (Baker) Panigrahi; Asplenium tetraploideum Panigrahi

= Asplenium aethiopicum =

Species of flowering plant

Asplenium aethiopicum is a lithophytic or sometimes epiphytic species of fern found in Southern and tropical Africa, tropical America, Asia and Australia. It is listed as critically endangered in Victoria, Australia. It is considered exotic in New Zealand.

== Taxonomy ==
Asplenium aethiopicum was originally published under the name Trichomanes aethiopicum by Nicolaas Laurens Burman in 1768. In 1935 Alfred Becherer moved this taxon to the genus Asplenium creating the name Asplenium aethiopicum.
