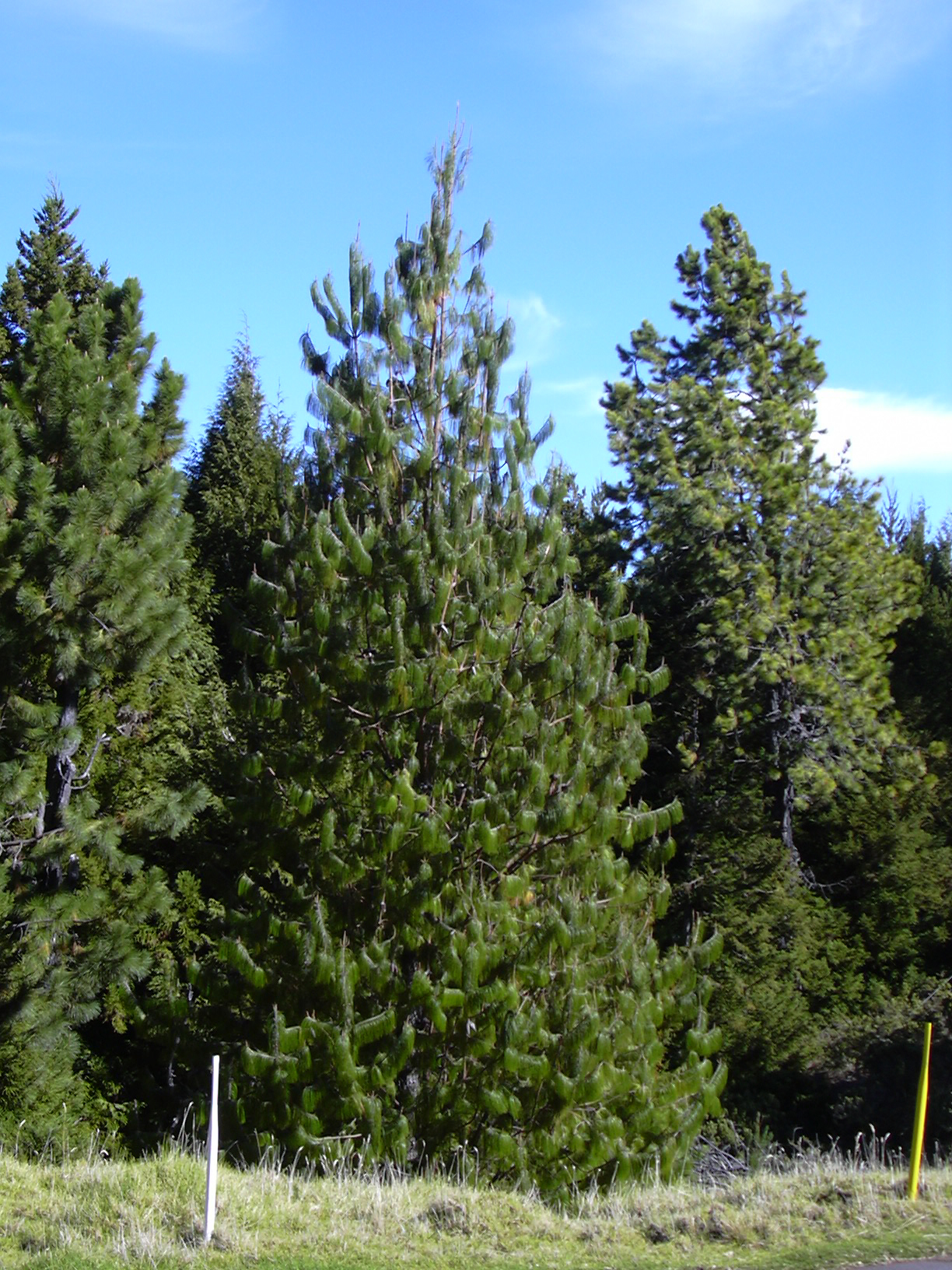

Conservation status
- Least Concern (IUCN 2.3)

Scientific classification
- Kingdom: Plantae
- Clade: Tracheophytes
- Clade: Gymnosperms
- Division: Pinophyta
- Class: Pinopsida
- Order: Pinales
- Family: Pinaceae
- Genus: Pinus
- Subgenus: P. subg. Pinus
- Section: P. sect. Trifoliae
- Subsection: P. subsect. Australes
- Species: P. patula

Binomial name
- Pinus patula Schiede ex Schltdl. & Cham.
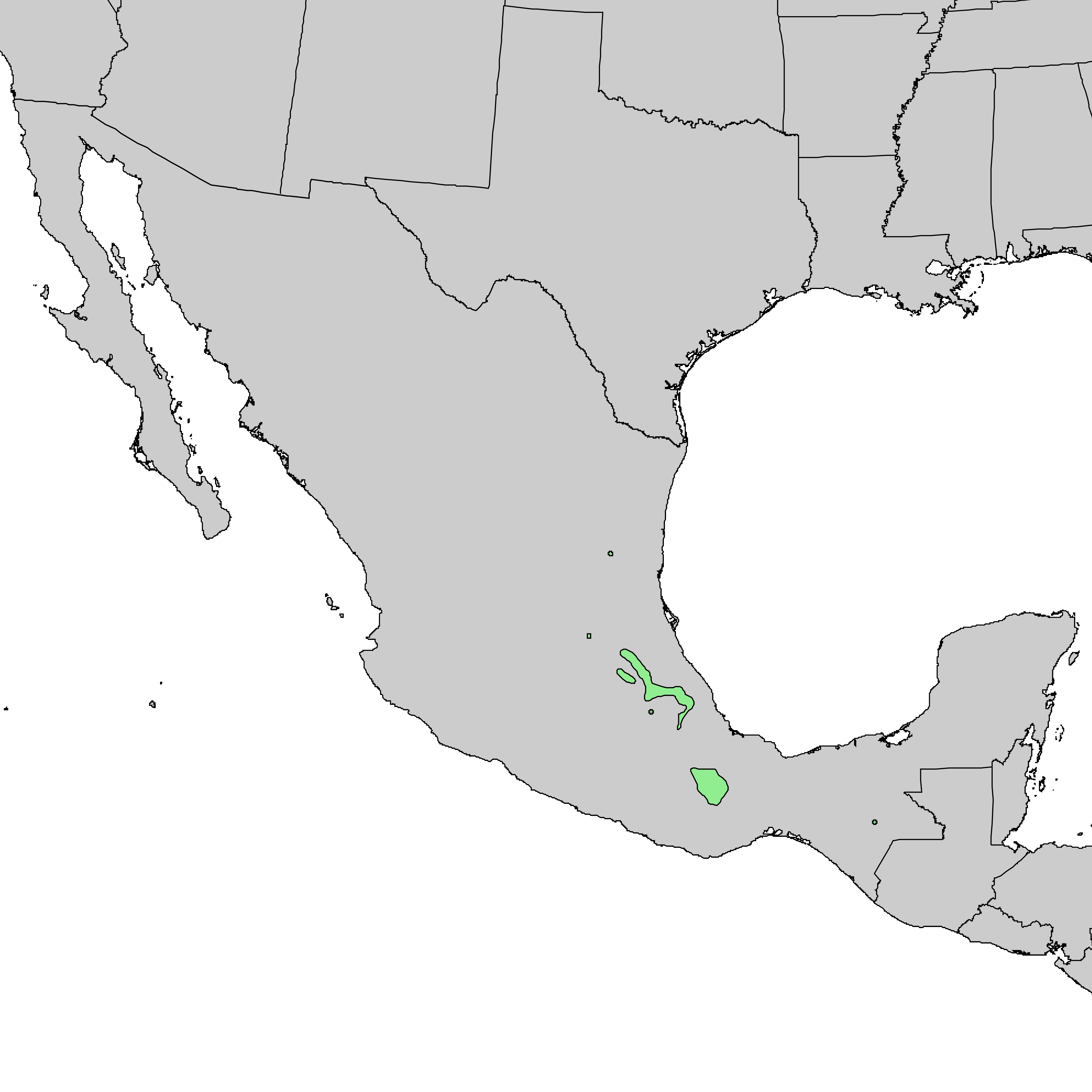
- Natural range of Pinus patula

= Pinus patula =

Species of conifer

Pinus patula, commonly known as patula pine, spreading-leaved pine, or Mexican weeping pine, and in Spanish as pino patula or pino llorón, (patula Latin = "spreading") is a species of conifer in the family Pinaceae, a pine tree native to the highlands of Mexico. It grows from 24° to 18° North latitude and 1,800–2,700 m (5,900–8,900 ft) above sea level. The tree grows up to 30 m (98 ft) tall. It can only withstand short periods of temperatures as low as −10 °C (14 °F), but resists well occasional dips below 0 °C (32 °F). It is moderately drought-tolerant, and in this respect is superior to Pinus taeda. The average annual rainfall in its native habitat is from 750 to 2000 mm. This falls mostly in summer, but in a little area of the State of Veracruz on the Sierra Madre Oriental its habitat is rainy the year round.

It is planted at high altitudes in Ecuador (3500 m), Bolivia, Colombia (3300 m), Kenya, Tanzania, Angola, Zimbabwe, Papua New Guinea, and Hawaii (3000 m). In Hawaii it is replacing the native alpine grassland.

At lower altitudes than in its origin country it is cultivated in Southern Brazil, South Africa, India, and in the Argentine provinces of Córdoba and San Luis. it is planted for forestation purposes in lands originally covered by bushland.

It has been introduced near sea level in New South Wales, Australia, where it spreads naturally by wind and is very favored because rainfalls are more abundant in summer. It was also introduced in New Zealand for commercial purposes and is fully naturalized there. It is cultivated in the United Kingdom as an ornamental tree for parks and gardens, and has gained the Royal Horticultural Society's Award of Garden Merit.

The timber is pale-pink to salmon, moderately soft, brittle and smelling strongly of aniseed when freshly cut.

== Foliage ==
The grass green needles are 6 to 9 inches long and droop to give a weeping effect. They are in bundles of 3 or 4.

== Taxonomic notes ==
There are two varieties: P. patula Schiede ex Schlechtendal et Chamisso var. patula and P. patula Schiede ex Schlechtendal et Chamisso var. longipedunculata Loock ex Martínez.
