= Indian Ocean coastal belt =

Afrotropic terrestrial biome in South Africa

The Indian Ocean coastal belt is one of the nine recognised biomes of South Africa. They are described in terms of their vegetation and climatic variations.

== Location and description ==
The Indian Ocean coastal belt is a region of coastal dunes and coastal grassy plains in KwaZuluNatal and the Eastern Cape, from sea level to an altitude of about 600 m. Mean annual rainfall ranges from 819 to 1,272 mm, and falls throughout the year, peaking in summer. The mean annual temperature ranges from 19.1 °C near the Mbhashe River in the southwest to 22 °C in the north east near the Mozambican border, with hot summers and mild, frost-free winters. The belt is about 800 km long and narrow, with a maximum width of about 35 km in the north to less than 10 km in parts of the wild coast, and the total area is relatively small.

The relief of the region varies between flat in Maputaland, rolling hills with deeply incised valleys between Richards Bay and Port Edward in KwaZulu-Natal and further south as far as the Great Kei River mouth. The Pondoland coast and other areas with sandstone geology have elevated plateaus with deep gorges.

== Flora ==
The dominant forest cover is interrupted by areas of grassland, with part of the belt comprising dense savanna vegetation, with scattered areas of forest and grassland. Most of the coastal belt outside the remaining patches of forest has been changed considerably.

The following vegetation units have been identified:

- Maputaland Coastal Belt
- Maputaland Wooded Grassland
- KwaZulu-Natal Coastal Belt
- Pondoland-Ugu Sandstone Coastal Sourveld, which is characterised by grassland species, with some scattered low shrubs and small trees.
- Transkei Coastal Belt

== Economic value ==
The region provides water supplies and fodder for livestock grazing.

== Threats and preservation ==
The biome is fairly well protected relative to the other South African biomes in that about 45% of the 20-year target is protected.

== Climate change impacts ==
Three scenarios have been modeled for climate change impacts on the South African biomes. The low risk scenario suggests a possible increase in area for this biome, with warm, moist conditions expanding southwest along the coast, and extending further inland, but the intermediate and high risk models show a possibility of less water availability and parts of the biome shifting to a savanna climate.

== See also ==
- Wildlife of South Africa
- Albany thickets – Afrotropic terrestrial ecoregion of dense woodland in South Africa
- Nama Karoo – Xeric shrubland ecoregion on the central plateau of South Africa and Namibia
- Succulent Karoo – Desert ecoregion of South Africa and Namibia
