= Lists of flowering plants of South Africa =

List of lists of flowering plants recorded from South Africa

The anthophytes are a grouping of plant taxa bearing flower-like reproductive structures. They were formerly thought to be a clade comprising plants bearing flower-like structures. The group contained the angiosperms - the extant flowering plants, such as roses and grasses - as well as the Gnetales and the extinct Bennettitales.

Detailed morphological and molecular studies have shown that the group is not actually monophyletic, with proposed floral homologies of the gnetophytes and the angiosperms having evolved in parallel. This makes it easier to reconcile molecular clock data that suggests that the angiosperms diverged from the gymnosperms around 300 million years ago.

Some more recent studies have used the word anthophyte to describe a group which includes the angiosperms and a variety of fossils (glossopterids, Pentoxylon, Bennettitales, and Caytonia), but not the Gnetales.

23,420 species of vascular plant have been recorded in South Africa, making it the sixth most species-rich country in the world and the most species-rich country on the African continent. Of these, 153 species are considered to be threatened. Nine biomes have been described in South Africa: Fynbos, Succulent Karoo, desert, Nama Karoo, grassland, savanna, Albany thickets, the Indian Ocean coastal belt, and forests.

The 2018 South African National Biodiversity Institute's National Biodiversity Assessment plant checklist lists 35,130 taxa in the phyla Anthocerotophyta (hornworts (6)), Anthophyta (flowering plants (33534)), Bryophyta (mosses (685)), Cycadophyta (cycads (42)), Lycopodiophyta (Lycophytes(45)), Marchantiophyta (liverworts (376)), Pinophyta (conifers (33)), and Pteridophyta (cryptogams (408)).

== Listing ==
The flowering plant diversity checklists include historical taxa recorded from the region, and the recognised taxa with which they are considered synonymous. Endemic, indigenous, and invasive taxa are labelled.

=== Acorales ===
List of Acorales of South Africa – Order: Acorales,

One family is represented:

- Family:Acoraceae, (1 species)
  - Acorus calamus L. not indigenous

=== Alismatales ===
List of Alismatales of South Africa – Order: Alismatales.

11 families are represented:

- Alismataceae,
- Aponogetonaceae,
- Araceae,
- Cymodoceaceae,
- Hydrocharitaceae,
- Juncaginaceae,
- Lemnaceae,
- Limnocharitaceae,
- Potamogetonaceae,
- Ruppiaceae,
- Zosteraceae

=== Apiales ===
List of Apiales of South Africa – Order: Apiales,

Two families are represented:

- Apiaceae
- Pittosporaceae

=== Aquifoliales ===
List of Aquifoliales of South Africa – Order: Aquifoliales,

One family is represented:

- Family: Aquifoliaceae,
  - Ilex crocea Thunb. accepted as Elaeodendron croceum (Thunb.) DC.
  - Ilex mitis (L.) Radlk. indigenous
  - Ilex mitis (L.) Radlk. var. mitis, indigenous

=== Arecales ===
List of Arecales of South Africa – Order: Arecales:

One family is represented:

- Family: Arecaceae,
  - Borassus aethiopum Mart. indigenous
  - Hyphaene coriacea Gaertn. indigenous
  - Hyphaene petersiana Klotzsch ex Mart. indigenous
  - Jubaeopsis afra Becc. endemic
  - Livistona chinensis (Jacq.) R.Br. ex Mart. not indigenous, cultivated
  - Phoenix canariensis Chabaud, not indigenous, cultivated, invasive
  - Phoenix reclinata Jacq. indigenous
  - Raphia australis Oberm. & Strey, indigenous
  - Washingtonia filifera (L.Linden) H.Wendl. not indigenous, cultivated
  - Washingtonia robusta H.Wendl. not indigenous, cultivated, invasive

=== Asparagales ===
List of Asparagales of South Africa – Order: Asparagales,

14 families are represented:

- Agapanthaceae
- Agavaceae
- Alliaceae
- Amaryllidaceae
- Asparagaceae
- Asphodelaceae
- Hemerocallidaceae
- Hyacinthaceae
- Hypoxidaceae
- Iridaceae
- Lanariaceae
- Orchidaceae
- Ruscaceae
- Tecophilaeaceae

=== Asterales ===
List of Asterales of South Africa – Order: Asterales,

Five families are represented:

- Family: Asteraceae,
- Family: Campanulaceae,
- Family: Goodeniaceae,
- Family: Lobeliaceae,
- Family: Menyanthaceae,

=== Boraginales ===
List of Boraginales of South Africa – Order: Boraginales,

One family is represented:

- Family: Boraginaceae

=== Brassicales ===
List of Brassicales of South Africa – Order: Brassicales,

Six families are represented:

- Family: Brassicaceae,
- Family: Capparaceae,
- Family: Cleomaceae,
- Family: Resedaceae,
- Family: Salvadoraceae,
- Family: Tropaeolaceae,

=== Bruniales ===
List of Bruniales of South Africa – Order: Bruniales,

One family is represented:

- Family: Bruniaceae,

=== Buxales ===
List of Buxales of South Africa – Order: Buxales,

One family is represented:

- Family: Buxaceae,
  - Buxus macowanii Oliv. endemic
  - Buxus natalensis (Oliv.) Hutch. endemic

=== Canellales ===
List of Canellales of South Africa – Order: Canellales,

One family is represented:

- Family: Canellaceae,
  - Warburgia salutaris (G.Bertol.) Chiov. indigenous

=== Caryophyllales ===
List of Caryophyllales of South Africa – Order: Caryophyllales,

21 families are represented:

- Family: Aizoaceae,
- Family: Amaranthaceae,
- Family: Anacampserotaceae,
- Family: Basellaceae,
- Family: Cactaceae,
- Family: Caryophyllaceae,
- Family: Corbichoniaceae,
- Family: Didiereaceae,
- Family: Droseraceae,
- Family: Frankeniaceae,
- Family: Gisekiaceae,
- Family: Kewaceae,
- Family: Limeaceae,
- Family: Lophiocarpaceae,
- Family: Molluginaceae,
- Family: Nyctaginaceae,
- Family: Phytolaccaceae,
- Family: Plumbaginaceae,
- Family: Polygonaceae,
- Family: Portulacaceae,
- Family: Tamaricaceae,

=== Celastrales ===
List of Celastrales of South Africa – Order: Celastrales,

One family is represented:

- Family: Celastraceae,

=== Ceratophyllales ===
List of Ceratophyllales of South Africa – Order: Ceratophyllales,

One family is represented:

Family: Ceratophyllaceae,

- Ceratophyllum demersum L. indigenous
  - Ceratophyllum demersum L. var. demersum, indigenous
  - Ceratophyllum demersum L. var. demersum forma demersum, accepted as Ceratophyllum demersum L. var. demersum, present
- Ceratophyllum muricatum Cham. indigenous
  - Ceratophyllum muricatum Cham. subsp. muricatum, indigenous
- Ceratophyllum submersum L. indigenous
  - Ceratophyllum submersum L. subsp. muricatum (Cham.) Wilmot-Dear var. echinatum, accepted as Ceratophyllum muricatum Cham. subsp. muricatum, present
  - Ceratophyllum submersum L. subsp. submersum var. submersum, indigenous

=== Commelinales ===
List of Commelinales of South Africa – Order: Commelinales,

Three families are represented:

- Family: Commelinaceae,
- Family: Haemodoraceae,
- Family: Pontederiaceae,

=== Cornales ===
List of Cornales of South Africa – Order: Cornales,

Four families are represented:

- Family: Curtisiaceae,
  - Curtisia dentata (Burm.f.) C.A.Sm. indigenous
- Family: Grubbiaceae,
  - Grubbia rosmarinifolia P.J.Bergius, indigenous
    - Grubbia rosmarinifolia P.J.Bergius subsp. gracilis (T.M.Salter) Carlquist, endemic
    - Grubbia rosmarinifolia P.J.Bergius subsp. hirsuta (E.Mey. ex DC.) Carlquist, endemic
    - Grubbia rosmarinifolia P.J.Bergius subsp. rosmarinifolia var. pinifolia, endemic
    - Grubbia rosmarinifolia P.J.Bergius subsp. rosmarinifolia var. rosmarinifolia, endemic
  - Grubbia rourkei Carlquist, endemic
  - Grubbia tomentosa (Thunb.) Harms, endemic
- Family: Hydrostachyaceae,
  - Hydrostachys polymorpha Klotzsch ex A.Br. indigenous
- Family: Loasaceae,
  - Kissenia capensis Endl. indigenous

=== Crossosomatales ===
List of Crossosomatales of South Africa – Order: Crossosomatales,

Two families are represented:

- Family: Aphloiaceae,
  - Aphloia theiformis (Vahl) Benn. indigenous
- Family: Geissolomataceae,
  - Geissoloma marginatum (L.) Juss. endemic

=== Cucurbitales ===
List of Cucurbitales of South Africa – Order: Cucurbitales,

Two families are represented:

- Family: Begoniaceae,
- Family: Cucurbitaceae,

=== Dioscoreales ===
List of Dioscoreales of South Africa – Order: Dioscoreales,

Three families are represented:

- Family: Burmanniaceae,
- Family: Dioscoreaceae,
- Family: Nartheciaceae,

=== Dipsacales ===
List of Dipsacales of South Africa – Order: Dipsacales,

Three families are represented:

- Family: Caprifoliaceae,
- Family: Dipsacaceae,
- Family: Valerianaceae,

=== Ericales ===
List of Ericales of South Africa – Order: Ericales,

11 families are represented:

- Family: Actinidiaceae,
- Family: Balsaminaceae,
- Family: Ebenaceae,
- Family: Ericaceae,
- Family: Lecythidaceae,
- Family: Maesaceae,
- Family: Myrsinaceae,
- Family: Primulaceae,
- Family: Roridulaceae,
- Family: Sapotaceae,
- Family: Theophrastaceae,

=== Escallionales ===
List of Escalloniales of South Africa – Order: Escalloniales,

One family is represented:

Family: Escalloniaceae,

- Choristylis rhamnoides Harv., accepted as Itea rhamnoides (Harv.) Kubitzki, indigenous
- Itea rhamnoides (Harv.) Kubitzki, indigenous

=== Fabales ===
List of Fabales of South Africa – Order: Fabales,

Two families are represented:

- Family: Fabaceae,
- Family: Polygalaceae,

=== Fagales ===
List of Fagales of South Africa – Order: Fagales,

Five families are represented:

- Family: Betulaceae,
- Family: Casuarinaceae,
- Family: Fagaceae,
- Family: Juglandaceae,
- Family: Myricaceae,

=== Gentianales ===
List of Gentianales of South Africa – Order: Gentianales,

Five families are represented:

- Family: Apocynaceae,
- Family: Asclepiadaceae,
- Family: Gentianaceae,
- Family: Loganiaceae,
- Family: Rubiaceae,

=== Geraniales ===
List of Geraniales of South Africa – Order: Geraniales,

Two families are represented:

- Family: Geraniaceae,
- Family: Melianthaceae,

=== Gunnerales ===
List of Gunnerales of South Africa – Order: Gunnerales,

Two families are represented:

- Family: Gunneraceae,
  - Gunnera perpensa L. indigenous
- Family: Myrothamnaceae,
  - Myrothamnus flabellifolius Welw. indigenous

=== Huerteales ===
List of Huerteales of South Africa – Order: Huerteales,

One family is represented:

- Family: Gerrardinaceae,
  - Genus Gerrardina
    - Gerrardina foliosa Oliv. indigenous

=== Icacinales ===
List of Icacinales of South Africa – Order: Icacinales,

One family is represented:

- Family: Icacinaceae,
  - Genus Apodytes
    - Apodytes abbottii Potgieter & A.E.van Wyk, endemic
    - Apodytes dimidiata E.Mey. ex Arn. indigenous
      - Apodytes dimidiata E.Mey. ex Arn. subsp. Dimidiata, indigenous
    - Apodytes geldenhuysii A.E.van Wyk & Potgieter, endemic
  - Genus Cassinopsis
    - Cassinopsis ilicifolia (Hochst.) Kuntze, indigenous
    - Cassinopsis tinifolia Harv. indigenous
  - Genus Pyrenacantha
    - Pyrenacantha grandiflora Baill. indigenous
    - Pyrenacantha kaurabassana Baill. indigenous
    - Pyrenacantha scandens Planch. ex Harv. indigenous

=== Lamiales ===
List of Lamiales of South Africa – Order: Lamiales,

15 families are represented:

- Family: Acanthaceae,
- Family: Bignoniaceae,
- Family: Gesneriaceae,
- Family: Lamiaceae,
- Family: Lentibulariaceae,
- Family: Linderniaceae,
- Family: Martyniaceae,
- Family: Oleaceae,
- Family: Orobanchaceae,
- Family: Paulowniaceae,
- Family: Pedaliaceae,
- Family: Plantaginaceae,
- Family: Scrophulariaceae,
- Family: Stilbaceae,
- Family: Verbenaceae,

=== Laurales ===
List of Laurales of South Africa – Order: Laurales,

Two families are represented:

- Family: Lauraceae,
  - Genus Cassytha
    - Cassytha ciliolata Nees, indigenous
    - Cassytha filiformis L. indigenous
    - Cassytha pondoensis Engl. endemic
      - Cassytha pondoensis Engl. var. pondoensis, not indigenous, naturalised
  - Genus Cinnamomum
    - Cinnamomum camphora (L.) J.Presl, indigenous
  - Genus Cryptocarya
    - Cryptocarya angustifolia E.Mey. ex Meisn. endemic
    - Cryptocarya latifolia Sond. not indigenous, naturalised, invasive
    - Cryptocarya liebertiana Engl. endemic
    - Cryptocarya myrtifolia Stapf, endemic
    - Cryptocarya transvaalensis Burtt Davy, indigenous
    - Cryptocarya woodii Engl. endemic
    - Cryptocarya wyliei Stapf, indigenous
  - Genus Dahlgrenodendron
    - Dahlgrenodendron natalense (J.H.Ross) J.J.M.van der Merwe & A.E.van Wyk, indigenous
  - Genus Gyrocarpus
    - Gyrocarpus americanus Jacq. endemic
      - Gyrocarpus americanus Jacq. subsp. africanus Kubitzki, endemic
  - Genus Litsea
    - Litsea glutinosa (Lour.) C.B.Rob. not indigenous, naturalised, invasive
    - Litsea sebifera Pers. not indigenous, naturalised
  - Genus Ocotea
    - Ocotea bullata (Burch.) Baill. indigenous
    - Ocotea kenyensis (Chiov.) Robyns & R.Wilczek, indigenous
  - Genus Persea
    - Persea americana Mill. not indigenous, cultivated, naturalised, invasive
- Family: Monimiaceae,
  - Genus Xymalos
    - Xymalos monospora (Harv.) Baill. indigenous

=== Liliales ===
List of Liliales of South Africa – Order: Liliales,

Five families are represented:

- Family: Alstroemeriaceae,
- Family: Colchicaceae,
- Family: Liliaceae,
- Family: Melanthiaceae,
- Family: Smilacaceae,

=== Magnoliales ===
List of Magnoliales of South Africa – Order: Magnoliales,

One family is represented:

- Family: Annonaceae,

=== Malpighiales ===
List of Malpighiales of South Africa – Order: Malpighiales,

20 families are represented:

- Family: Achariaceae,
- Family: Chrysobalanaceae,
- Family: Clusiaceae,
- Family: Dichapetalaceae,
- Family: Elatinaceae,
- Family: Erythroxylaceae,
- Family: Euphorbiaceae,
- Family: Hypericaceae,
- Family: Linaceae,
- Family: Malpighiaceae,
- Family: Ochnaceae,
- Family: Passifloraceae,
- Family: Phyllanthaceae,
- Family: Picrodendraceae,
- Family: Podostemaceae,
- Family: Putranjivaceae,
- Family: Rhizophoraceae,
- Family: Salicaceae,
- Family: Turneraceae,
- Family: Violaceae,

=== Malvales ===
List of Malvales of South Africa – Order: Malvales,

Six families are represented:

- Family: Balanophoraceae,
- Family: Cistaceae,
- Family: Cytinaceae,
- Family: Malvaceae,
- Family: Neuradaceae,
- Family: Thymelaeaceae,

=== Myrtales ===
List of Myrtales of South Africa – Order: Myrtales,

10 families are represented:

- Family: Combretaceae,
- Family: Heteropyxidaceae,
- Family: Lythraceae,
- Family: Melastomataceae,
- Family: Memecylaceae,
- Family: Myrtaceae,
- Family: Oliniaceae,
- Family: Onagraceae,
- Family: Penaeaceae,
- Family: Rhynchocalycaceae,

=== Nymphaeales ===
List of Nymphaeales of South Africa – Order: Nymphaeales,

Two families are represented:

Family: Cabombaceae,

- Genus Brasenia
  - Brasenia schreberi J.F.Gmel. indigenous

Family: Nymphaeaceae,

- Genus Nymphaea
  - Nymphaea lotus L. indigenous
  - Nymphaea mexicana Zucc. not indigenous, naturalised, invasive
  - Nymphaea nouchali Burm.f. indigenous
    - Nymphaea nouchali Burm.f. var. caerulea (Savigny) Verdc. indigenous
    - Nymphaea nouchali Burm.f. var. zanzibariensis (Casp.) Verdc. indigenous

=== Oxalidales ===
List of Oxalidales of South Africa – Order: Oxalidales,

Four families are represented:

- Family: Connaraceae,
- Family: Cunoniaceae,
- Family: Elaeocarpaceae,
- Family: Oxalidaceae,

=== Pandanales ===
List of Pandanales of South Africa – Order: Pandanales,

One family is represented:

- Family: Velloziaceae,

=== Piperales ===
List of Piperales of South Africa – Order: Piperales,

Four families are represented:

Family: Aristolochiaceae,

- Genus Aristolochia
  - Aristolochia elegans Mast. not indigenous, naturalised, invasive

Family: Hydnoraceae,

- Genus Hydnora
  - Hydnora abyssinica A.Br. indigenous
  - Hydnora africana Thunb. indigenous
  - Hydnora johannis Becc. var. johannis accepted as Hydnora abyssinica A.Br. present
  - Hydnora triceps Drege & E.Mey. indigenous
  - Hydnora visseri Bolin, E.Maass & Musselman, indigenous

Family: Piperaceae,

- Genus Peperomia
  - Peperomia blanda (Jacq.) Kunth, indigenous
    - Peperomia blanda (Jacq.) Kunth var. leptostachya (Hook. & Arn.) Dull, accepted as Peperomia blanda (Jacq.) Kunth, present
  - Peperomia retusa (L.f.) A.Dietr. indigenous
    - Peperomia retusa (L.f.) A.Dietr. var. bachmannii (C.DC.) Dull, indigenous
    - Peperomia retusa (L.f.) A.Dietr. var. retusa, indigenous
  - Peperomia rotundifolia (L.) Kunth, indigenous
  - Peperomia tetraphylla (G.Forst.) Hook. & Arn. indigenous
- Genus Piper
  - Piper capense L.f. var. capense, indigenous

Family: Saururaceae,

- Genus Houttuynia
  - Houttuynia cordata Thunb. not indigenous, naturalised, invasive

=== Poales ===
List of Poales of South Africa – Order: Poales,

10 families are represented:

- Family: Bromeliaceae,
- Family: Cyperaceae,
- Family: Eriocaulaceae,
- Family: Flagellariaceae,
- Family: Juncaceae,
- Family: Poaceae,
- Family: Restionaceae,
- Family: Thurniaceae,
- Family: Typhaceae,
- Family: Xyridaceae,

=== Proteales ===
List of Proteales of South Africa – Order: Proteales,

Two families are represented:

- Family: Platanaceae,
- Family: Proteaceae,

=== Ranunculales ===
List of Ranunculales of South Africa – Order: Ranunculales,

Five families are represented:

- Family: Berberidaceae,
- Family: Fumariaceae,
- Family: Menispermaceae,
- Family: Papaveraceae,
- Family: Ranunculaceae,

=== Rosales ===
List of Rosales of South Africa – Order: Rosales,

Six families are represented:

- Family: Cannabaceae,
- Family: Moraceae,
- Family: Rhamnaceae,
- Family: Rosaceae,
- Family: Ulmaceae,
- Family: Urticaceae,

=== Santalales ===
List of Santalales of South Africa – Order: Santalales,

Three families are represented:

- Family: Loranthaceae,
- Family: Olacaceae,
- Family: Santalaceae,

=== Sapindales ===
List of Sapindales of South Africa – Order: Sapindales,

Eight families are represented:

- Family: Anacardiaceae,
- Family: Burseraceae,
- Family: Kirkiaceae,
- Family: Meliaceae,
- Family: Peganaceae,
- Family: Rutaceae,
- Family: Sapindaceae,
- Family: Simaroubaceae,

=== Saxifragales ===
List of Saxifragales of South Africa – Order: Saxifragales,

Four families are represented:

- Family: Altingiaceae,
- Family: Crassulaceae,
- Family: Haloragaceae,
- Family: Hamamelidaceae,

=== Solanales ===
List of Solanales of South Africa – Order: Solanales,

Four families are represented:

- Family: Convolvulaceae,
- Family: Montiniaceae,
- Family: Solanaceae,
- Family: Sphenocleaceae,

=== Vahliales ===
List of Vahliales of South Africa – Order: Vahliales,

One family is represented:

Family: Vahliaceae,

- Genus Vahlia
  - Vahlia capensis (L.f.) Thunb. indigenous
    - Vahlia capensis (L.f.) Thunb. subsp. capensis, indigenous
    - Vahlia capensis (L.f.) Thunb. subsp. ellipticifolia Bridson, indigenous
    - Vahlia capensis (L.f.) Thunb. subsp. vulgaris Bridson var. latifolia, endemic
    - Vahlia capensis (L.f.) Thunb. subsp. vulgaris Bridson var. linearis, indigenous
    - Vahlia capensis (L.f.) Thunb. subsp. vulgaris Bridson var. longifolia, indigenous
    - Vahlia capensis (L.f.) Thunb. subsp. vulgaris Bridson var. vulgaris, indigenous

=== Vitales ===
List of Vitales of South Africa – Order: Vitales,

One family is represented:

- Family: Vitaceae,

=== Zingiberales ===
List of Zingiberales of South Africa – Order: Zingiberales,

Five families are represented:

Family: Cannaceae,

- Genus Canna
  - Canna edulis Ker Gawl. accepted as Canna indica L. not indigenous, naturalised
  - Canna flaccida Salisb. not indigenous, naturalised, invasive
  - Canna glauca L. not indigenous, naturalised
  - Canna indica L. not indigenous, naturalised, invasive
  - Canna x generalis L.H.Bailey, not indigenous, naturalised, invasive

Family: Marantaceae,

- Genus Maranta
  - Maranta leuconeura E.Morren, not indigenous, cultivated, naturalised

Family: Musaceae,

- Genus Ensete
  - Ensete ventricosum (Welw.) Cheesman, indigenous

Family: Strelitziaceae,

- Genus Strelitzia
  - Strelitzia alba (L.f.) Skeels, endemic
  - Strelitzia caudata R.A.Dyer, indigenous
  - Strelitzia juncea (Ker Gawl.) Link, endemic
  - Strelitzia nicolai Regel & Korn. indigenous
  - Strelitzia parvifolia W.T.Aiton var. juncea Ker Gawl. accepted asStrelitzia juncea (Ker Gawl.) Link, indigenous
  - Strelitzia reginae Banks, indigenous
    - Strelitzia reginae Banks subsp. mzimvubuensis Van Jaarsv. indigenous
    - Strelitzia reginae Banks subsp. reginae, indigenous
    - Strelitzia reginae Banks var. juncea (Ker Gawl.) H.E.Moore Strelitzia juncea (Ker Gawl.) Link, indigenous

Family: Zingiberaceae,

- Genus Alpinia
  - Alpinia zerumbet (Pers.) B.L.Burtt & R.M.Sm., not indigenous, naturalised, invasive
- Genus Hedychium
  - Hedychium coccineum Buch.-Ham. ex Sm., not indigenous, cultivated, naturalised, invasive
  - Hedychium coronarium J.Konig, not indigenous, naturalised, invasive
  - Hedychium flavescens Roscoe, not indigenous, naturalised, invasive
  - Hedychium gardnerianum Ker Gawl., not indigenous, naturalised, invasive
- Genus Siphonochilus
  - Siphonochilus aethiopicus (Schweinf.) B.L.Burtt, indigenous
  - Siphonochilus natalensis (Schltr. & K.Schum.) J.M.Wood & Franks, accepted as Siphonochilus aethiopicus (Schweinf.) B.L.Burtt, present

=== Zygophyllales ===
List of Zygophyllales of South Africa – Order: Zygophyllales,

One family is represented:

- Family: Zygophyllaceae,

== See also ==
- Biodiversity of South Africa – Variety of life within South Africa and its exclusive economic zone
- List of conifers of South Africa – Plants of the class Pinophyta recorded from South Africa
- List of cycads of South Africa – Seed producing vascular plants of the division Cycadophyta recorded from South Africa
- List of hornworts of South Africa – Non-vascular spore-bearing plants in the division Anthocerotophyta recorded from South Africa
- List of liverworts of South Africa – Non-vascular land plants with a gametophyte-dominant life cycle recorded from South Africa
- List of lycophytes of South Africa – Spore bearing vascular plants of the division Lycopodiophyta recorded from South Africa
- List of mosses of South Africa – Small, non-vascular flowerless plants recorded from South Africa
- List of pteridophytes of South Africa – Spore-bearing vascular plants recorded from South Africa
