= APG V system =

2026 revision of a flowering plant classification

The APG V system is the fifth version of a system of plant taxonomy for flowering plants (angiosperms) being developed by the Angiosperm Phylogeny Group (APG). It was published in 2026, ten years after its predecessor, the APG IV system, was published in 2016.

While APG I–IV were based primarily on plastid DNA analyses, APG V incorporates the results of large-scale nuclear phylogenomic analyses.

== Changes at the Order Level ==
- Nuclear gene analyses resulted in changes to the circumscriptions of Icacinales, Aquifoliales, Oxalidales, and Bruniales in APG IV. New orders have been recognized: Oncothecales (containing only the family Oncothecaceae) and Cardiopteridales (containing the families Cardiopteridaceae and Stemonuraceae); meanwhile, the families Huaceae and Columelliaceae have been left unassigned to any order.
- The family Apodanthaceae, previously classified within the order Cucurbitales, has been shown to belong to the order Malpighiales; based on these results, the family has been reassigned to the Rafflesiaceae.

== Taxonomy ==
A list of the orders and families of angiosperms in APG V is presented below.

=== Angiosperms ===
- Amborellales Melikyan et al.
  - Amborellaceae Pichon, nom. cons.
- Nymphaeales Salisb. ex Bercht. & J.Presl
  - Hydatellaceae U.Hamann
  - Cabombaceae Rich. ex A.Rich., nom. cons.
  - Nymphaeaceae Salisb., nom. cons.
- Austrobaileyales Takht. ex Reveal
  - Austrobaileyaceae Croizat, nom. cons.
  - Trimeniaceae Gibbs, nom. cons.
  - Schisandraceae Blume, nom. cons.

=== Magnoliids ===
- Chloranthales Mart.
  - Chloranthaceae R.Br. ex Sims, nom. cons.
- Canellales Cronq.
  - Canellaceae Mart., nom. cons.
  - Winteraceae R.Br. ex Lindl., nom. cons.
- Piperales Bercht. & J.Presl
  - Aristolochiaceae Juss., nom. cons.
  - Saururaceae Rich. ex T.Lestib., nom. cons.
  - Piperaceae Giseke, nom. cons.
- Magnoliales Juss. ex Bercht. & J.Presl
  - Myristicaceae R.Br., nom. cons.
  - Degeneriaceae I.W.Bailey & A.C.Sm., nom. cons.
  - Himantandraceae Diels, nom. cons.
  - Magnoliaceae Juss., nom. cons.
  - Eupomatiaceae Orb., nom. cons.
  - Annonaceae Juss., nom. cons.
- Laurales Juss. ex Bercht. & J.Presl
  - Calycanthaceae Lindl., nom. cons.
  - Siparunaceae Schodde
  - Gomortegaceae Reiche, nom. cons.
  - Atherospermataceae R.Br.
  - Hernandiaceae Blume, nom. cons.
  - Monimiaceae Juss., nom. cons.
  - Lauraceae Juss., nom. cons.

=== Monocots ===
- Acorales Mart.
  - Acoraceae Martinov
- Alismatales R.Br. ex Bercht. & J.Presl
  - Tofieldiaceae Takht.
  - Araceae Juss., nom. cons.
  - Alismataceae Vent., nom. cons.
  - Butomaceae Mirb., nom. cons.
  - Hydrocharitaceae Juss., nom. cons.
  - Aponogetonaceae Planch., nom. cons.
  - Scheuchzeriaceae F.Rudolphi, nom. cons.
  - Juncaginaceae Rich., nom. cons.
  - Maundiaceae Nakai
  - Posidoniaceae Vines, nom. cons.
  - Ruppiaceae Horan., nom. cons.
  - Cymodoceaceae Vines, nom. cons.
  - Zosteraceae Dumort., nom. cons.
  - Potamogetonaceae Bercht. & J.Presl, nom. cons.
- Petrosaviales Takht.
  - Petrosaviaceae Hutch., nom. cons.
- Dioscoreales Mart.
  - Nartheciaceae Fr. ex Bjurzon
  - Burmanniaceae Blume, nom. cons.
  - ‘Dioscoreaceae’ R.Br., nom. cons. (including pro tem. Afrothismiaceae Cheek & Soto Gomez, Taccaceae Dumort., Thismiaceae J.G.Agardh)
- Pandanales R.Br. ex Bercht. & J.Presl
  - Velloziaceae J.Agardh, nom. cons.
  - Triuridaceae Gardner, nom. cons.
  - Stemonaceae Caruel, nom. cons.
  - Cyclanthaceae Poit. ex A.Rich., nom. cons.
  - Pandanaceae R.Br., nom. cons.
- Liliales Perleb
  - Campynemataceae Dumort.
  - Corsiaceae Becc., nom. cons.
  - Melanthiaceae Batsch ex Borkh., nom. cons.
  - Petermanniaceae Hutch, nom. cons.
  - Alstroemeriaceae Dumort., nom. cons.
  - Colchicaceae DC., nom. cons.
  - Philesiaceae Dumort., nom. cons.
  - Ripogonaceae Conran & Clifford
  - Smilacaceae Vent., nom. cons.
  - Liliaceae Juss., nom. cons.
- Asparagales Link
  - Orchidaceae Juss., nom. cons.
  - Boryaceae M.W.Chase et al.
  - Blandfordiaceae R.Dahlgren & Clifford
  - Asteliaceae Dumort.
  - Lanariaceae H.Huber ex R.Dahlgren
  - Hypoxidaceae R.Br., nom. cons.
  - Doryanthaceae R.Dahlgren & Clifford
  - Tecophilaeaceae Leyb., nom. cons. (including Ixioliriaceae Nakai)
  - Iridaceae Juss., nom. cons.
  - Xeronemataceae M.W.Chase et al.
  - Asphodelaceae Juss., nom. cons. prop.
  - Amaryllidaceae J.St.-Hil., nom. cons.
  - Asparagaceae Juss., nom. cons.
- Arecales Bromhead
  - Dasypogonaceae Dumort.
  - Arecaceae Bercht. & J.Presl, nom. cons., nom. alt. (= Palmae Juss., nom. cons., nom. alt.)
- Commelinales Mirb. ex Bercht. & J.Presl
  - Pontederiaceae Kunth, nom. cons.
  - Haemodoraceae R.Br., nom. cons.
  - Philydraceae Link, nom. cons.
  - Hanguanaceae Airy Shaw
  - Commelinaceae Mirb., nom. cons.
- Zingiberales Griseb.
  - Musaceae Juss., nom. cons.
  - Lowiaceae Ridl., nom. cons.
  - Strelitziaceae Hutch., nom. cons.
  - Heliconiaceae Vines
  - Cannaceae Juss., nom. cons.
  - Marantaceae R.Br., nom. cons.
  - Costaceae Nakai
  - Zingiberaceae Martinov, nom. cons.
- Poales Small
  - Typhaceae Juss., nom. cons.
  - Bromeliaceae Juss., nom. cons.
  - Rapateaceae Dumort., nom. cons.
  - Thurniaceae Engl., nom. cons.
  - Juncaceae Juss., nom. cons.
  - Cyperaceae Juss., nom. cons.
  - Mayacaceae Kunth, nom. cons.
  - Eriocaulaceae Martinov, nom. cons.
  - Xyridaceae C.Agardh, nom. cons.
  - Restionaceae R.Br., nom. cons.
  - Flagellariaceae Dumort., nom. cons.
  - Ecdeiocoleaceae D.W.Cutler & Airy Shaw
  - Joinvilleaceae Toml. & A.C.Sm.
  - Poaceae Barnhart, nom. cons., nom. alt. (= Gramineae Juss., nom. cons., nom. alt.)

=== Ceratophyllids ===
- Ceratophyllales Link
  - Ceratophyllaceae Gray, nom. cons.

=== Eudicots ===
- Ranunculales Juss. ex Bercht. & J.Presl
  - Eupteleaceae K.Wilh., nom. cons.
  - Papaveraceae Juss., nom. cons.
  - Circaeasteraceae Hutch., nom. cons.
  - Lardizabalaceae R.Br., nom. cons.
  - Menispermaceae Juss., nom. cons.
  - Berberidaceae Juss., nom. cons.
  - Ranunculaceae Juss., nom. cons.
- Proteales Juss. ex Bercht. & J.Presl
  - Sabiaceae Blume, nom. cons.
  - Nelumbonaceae A.Rich., nom. cons.
  - Platanaceae T.Lestib., nom. cons.
  - Proteaceae Juss., nom. cons.
- Trochodendrales Takht. ex Cronq.
  - Trochodendraceae Eichler, nom. cons.
- Buxales Takht. ex Reveal
  - Buxaceae Dumort., nom. cons.

=== Core eudicots ===
- Gunnerales Takht. ex Reveal
  - Myrothamnaceae Nied., nom. cons.
  - Gunneraceae Meisn., nom. cons.
- Dilleniales DC. ex Bercht. & J.Presl
  - Dilleniaceae Salisb., nom. cons.

=== Superrosids ===
- Vitales Juss. ex Bercht. & J.Presl
  - Vitaceae Juss., nom. cons.
- Saxifragales Bercht. & J.Presl
  - Cynomoriaceae Endl. ex Lindl., nom. cons.
  - Peridiscaceae Kuhlm., nom. cons.
  - Paeoniaceae Raf., nom. cons.
  - Daphniphyllaceae Müll.Arg., nom. cons.
  - Cercidiphyllaceae Engl., nom. cons.
  - Altingiaceae Lindl., nom. cons.
  - Hamamelidaceae R.Br., nom. cons.
  - Iteaceae J.Agardh, nom. cons.
  - Grossulariaceae DC., nom. cons.
  - Saxifragaceae Juss., nom. cons.
  - Tetracarpaeaceae Nakai
  - Aphanopetalaceae Doweld
  - Penthoraceae Rydb. ex Britton, nom. cons.
  - Haloragaceae R.Br., nom. cons.
  - Crassulaceae J.St.-Hil., nom. cons.

=== Rosids ===
==== Rosids not in fabid or malvid clades ====
- Crossosomatales Takht. ex Reveal
  - Aphloiaceae Takht.
  - Geissolomataceae A.DC., nom. cons.
  - Strasburgeriaceae Tiegh., nom. cons.
  - Guamatelaceae S.H.Oh & D.Potter
  - Stachyuraceae J.Agardh, nom. cons.
  - Crossosomataceae Engl., nom. cons.
  - Staphyleaceae Martinov, nom. cons.
- Geraniales Juss. ex Bercht. & J.Presl
  - Francoaceae A.Juss., nom. cons.
  - Geraniaceae Juss., nom. cons.
- Zygophyllales Link
  - Krameriaceae Dumort., nom. cons.
  - Zygophyllaceae R.Br., nom. cons.
- Myrtales Juss. ex Bercht. & J.Presl
  - Combretaceae R.Br., nom. cons.
  - Lythraceae J.St.-Hil., nom. cons.
  - Onagraceae Juss., nom. cons.
  - Crypteroniaceae A.DC., nom. cons.
  - Alzateaceae S.A.Graham
  - Penaeaceae Sweet ex Guill., nom. cons.
  - Melastomataceae Juss., nom. cons.
  - Vochysiaceae A.St.-Hil., nom. cons.
  - Myrtaceae Juss., nom. cons.

==== Fabids ====
- Fagales Engl.
  - Nothofagaceae Kuprian.
  - Myricaceae Rich. ex Kunth, nom. cons.
  - Juglandaceae DC. ex Perleb, nom. cons.
  - Casuarinaceae R.Br., nom. cons.
  - Ticodendraceae Gómez-Laur. & L.D.Gómez
  - Betulaceae Gray, nom. cons.
  - Fagaceae Dumort., nom. cons.
- Fabales Bromhead
  - Surianaceae Arn., nom. cons.
  - Polygalaceae Hoffmanns. & Link, nom. cons.
  - Quillajaceae D.Don
  - Fabaceae Lindl., nom. cons., nom. alt. (= Leguminosae Juss., nom. cons., nom. alt.)
- Cucurbitales Juss. ex Bercht. & J.Presl (excluding Apodanthaceae Tiegh. ex Takht.)
  - Corynocarpaceae Engl., nom. cons.
  - Anisophylleaceae Ridl.
  - Coriariaceae DC., nom. cons.
  - Cucurbitaceae Juss., nom. cons.
  - Datiscaceae Dumort., nom. cons.
  - Tetramelaceae Airy Shaw
  - Begoniaceae C.Agardh, nom. cons.
- Rosales Bercht. & J.Presl
  - Dirachmaceae Hutch.
  - Barbeyaceae Rendle, nom. cons.
  - Elaeagnaceae Juss., nom. cons.
  - Rhamnaceae Juss., nom. cons.
  - Ulmaceae Mirb., nom. cons.
  - Cannabaceae Martinov, nom. cons.
  - Moraceae Gaudich., nom. cons.
  - Urticaceae Juss., nom. cons.
  - Rosaceae Juss., nom. cons.

==== Malvids ====
- Picramniales Doweld
  - Picramniaceae Fernando & Quinn
- Celastrales Link
  - Lepidobotryaceae J.Léonard, nom. cons.
  - Celastraceae R.Br., nom. cons.
- Unplaced to order
  - Huaceae A.Chev.
- Malpighiales Juss. ex Bercht. & J.Presl
  - Rafflesiaceae Dumort., nom. cons. (including Apodanthaceae Tiegh. ex Takht.)
  - Ctenolophonaceae Exell & Mendonça
  - Pandaceae Engl. & Gilg, nom. cons.
  - Humiriaceae A.Juss., nom. cons.
  - Irvingiaceae Exell & Mendonça, nom. cons.
  - Ochnaceae DC., nom. cons.
  - Bonnetiaceae L.Beauvis. ex Nakai
  - Clusiaceae Lindl., nom. cons., nom. alt. (= Guttiferae Juss., nom. cons., nom. alt.)
  - Calophyllaceae J.Agardh
  - Podostemaceae Rich. ex Kunth, nom. cons.
  - Hypericaceae Juss., nom. cons.
  - Caryocaraceae Voigt, nom. cons.
  - Lophopyxidaceae H.Pfeiff.
  - Putranjivaceae Meisn.
  - Centroplacaceae Doweld & Reveal
  - Elatinaceae Dumort., nom. cons.
  - Malpighiaceae Juss., nom. cons.
  - Linaceae DC. ex Perleb, nom. cons.
  - Ixonanthaceae Planch. ex Miq., nom. cons.
  - Rhizophoraceae Pers., nom. cons.
  - Erythroxylaceae Kunth, nom. cons.
  - Balanopaceae Benth. & Hook.f., nom. cons.
  - Trigoniaceae A.Juss., nom. cons.
  - Dichapetalaceae Baill., nom. cons.
  - Euphroniaceae Marc.-Berti
  - Chrysobalanaceae R.Br., nom. cons.
  - Goupiaceae Miers
  - Achariaceae Harms, nom. cons.
  - Lacistemataceae Mart., nom. cons.
  - Salicaceae Mirb., nom. cons.
  - Passifloraceae Juss. ex Roussel, nom. cons.
  - Violaceae Batsch, nom. cons.
  - Picrodendraceae Small, nom. cons.
  - Phyllanthaceae Martinov, nom. cons.
  - Euphorbiaceae Juss., nom. cons. (including Peraceae Klotzsch)
- Huerteales Doweld
  - Gerrardinaceae M.H.Alford
  - Petenaeaceae Christenh. et al.
  - Tapisciaceae Takht.
  - Dipentodontaceae Merr., nom. cons.
- Oxalidales Bercht. & J.Presl (excluding Huaceae A.Chev.)
  - Connaraceae R.Br., nom. cons.
  - Oxalidaceae R.Br., nom. cons.
  - Cephalotaceae Dumort., nom. cons.
  - Cunoniaceae R.Br., nom. cons.
  - Brunelliaceae Engl., nom. cons.
  - Elaeocarpaceae Juss., nom. cons.
- Sapindales Juss. ex Bercht. & J.Presl
  - Biebersteiniaceae Schnizl.
  - Nitrariaceae Lindl.
  - Sapindaceae Juss., nom. cons.
  - Kirkiaceae Takht.
  - Burseraceae Kunth, nom. cons.
  - Anacardiaceae R.Br., nom. cons.
  - Simaroubaceae DC., nom. cons.
  - Rutaceae Juss., nom. cons.
  - Meliaceae Juss., nom. cons.
- Brassicales Bromhead
  - Moringaceae Martinov, nom. cons.
  - Caricaceae Dumort., nom. cons.
  - Akaniaceae Stapf, nom. cons.
  - Tropaeolaceae Juss. ex DC., nom. cons.
  - Setchellanthaceae Iltis
  - Limnanthaceae R.Br., nom. cons.
  - Tiganophytaceae Swanepoel et al.
  - Salvadoraceae Lindl., nom. cons. (including Bataceae Mart. ex Perleb, nom. cons.)
  - Koeberliniaceae Engl., nom. cons.
  - Emblingiaceae Airy Shaw
  - Pentadiplandraceae Hutch. & Dalziel
  - Tovariaceae Pax, nom. cons.
  - Gyrostemonaceae A.Juss., nom. cons.
  - Resedaceae Martinov, nom. cons. (including Borthwickia W.W.Sm., Forchhammeria Liebm., Stixaceae Doweld)
  - Capparaceae Juss., nom. cons.
  - Cleomaceae Bercht. & J.Presl
  - Brassicaceae Burnett, nom. cons. (= Cruciferae Juss., nom. cons.)
- Malvales Juss. ex Bercht. & J.Presl
  - Neuradaceae Kostel., nom. cons.
  - Cytinaceae A.Rich.
  - Thymelaeaceae Juss., nom. cons.
  - Muntingiaceae C.Bayer et al.
  - Sphaerosepalaceae Bullock
  - Bixaceae Kunth, nom. cons.
  - Cistaceae Juss., nom. cons. (including Pakaraimaea Maguire & P.S.Ashton)
  - Sarcolaenaceae Caruel, nom. cons.
  - Dipterocarpaceae Blume, nom. cons.
  - Malvaceae Juss., nom. cons.

=== Non-rosid, non-asterid orders ===
- Santalales R.Br. ex Bercht. & J.Presl
  - Strombosiaceae Tiegh.
  - Erythropalaceae Planch. ex Miq., nom. cons.
  - Olacaceae R.Br., nom. cons. (excluding Erythropalaceae Planch. ex Miq., Strombosiaceae Tiegh., including Aptandraceae Miers, Coulaceae van Tieghem, Octoknemaceae Tiegh., nom. cons., Ximeniaceae Horaninow)
  - Opiliaceae Valeton, nom. cons.
  - Balanophoraceae Rich., nom. cons. (including Mystropetalaceae Hook.f.)
  - Santalaceae R.Br., nom. cons. (including Amphorogynaceae Nickrent & Der, Cervantesiaceae Nickrent & Der, Comandraceae Nickrent & Der, Nanodeaceae Nickrent & Der, Thesiaceae Vest, Viscaceae Batsch)
  - Misodendraceae J.Agardh, nom. cons.
  - Schoepfiaceae Blume
  - Loranthaceae Juss., nom. cons.
- Caryophyllales Juss. ex Bercht. & J.Presl
  - Droseraceae Salisb., nom. cons.
  - Nepenthaceae Dumort., nom. cons.
  - Drosophyllaceae Chrtek et al.
  - Dioncophyllaceae Airy Shaw, nom. cons.
  - Ancistrocladaceae Planch. ex Walp., nom. cons.
  - Frankeniaceae Desv., nom. cons. (including Tamaricaceae Link, nom. cons.)
  - Plumbaginaceae Juss., nom. cons.
  - Polygonaceae Juss., nom. cons.
  - Rhabdodendraceae Prance
  - Simmondsiaceae Tiegh.
  - Physenaceae Takht.
  - Asteropeiaceae Takht. ex Reveal & Hoogland
  - Microteaceae Schäferhoff & Borsch
  - Stegnospermataceae Nakai
  - Achatocarpaceae Heimerl, nom. cons.
  - Amaranthaceae Juss., nom. cons.
  - Caryophyllaceae Juss., nom. cons.
  - Limeaceae Shipunov ex Reveal
  - Macarthuriaceae Christenh.
  - Lophiocarpaceae Doweld & Reveal (including Corbichoniaceae Thulin)
  - Barbeuiaceae Nakai
  - Kewaceae Christenh.
  - Aizoaceae Martinov, nom. cons.
  - Gisekiaceae Nakai
  - Phytolaccaceae R.Br., nom. cons. (including Agdestidaceae Nakai and Sarcobataceae Behnke)
  - Petiveriaceae C.Agardh
  - Nyctaginaceae Juss., nom. cons.
  - Molluginaceae Bartl., nom. cons.
  - Halophytaceae S.Soriano
  - Montiaceae Raf.
  - Basellaceae Raf., nom. cons.
  - Didiereaceae Radlk., nom. cons.
  - Talinaceae Doweld
  - Anacampserotaceae Eggli & Nyffeler
  - Portulacaceae Juss., nom. cons.
  - Cactaceae Juss., nom. cons.

=== Superasterids ===
- Berberidopsidales Doweld
  - Aextoxicaceae Engl. & Gilg, nom. cons.
  - Berberidopsidaceae Takht.

=== Asterids ===
- Cornales Link
  - Hydrostachyaceae Engl., nom. cons.
  - Curtisiaceae Takht.
  - Grubbiaceae Endl. ex Meisn., nom. cons.
  - Nyssaceae Juss. ex Dumort., nom. cons.
  - Cornaceae Bercht. & J.Presl, nom. cons.
  - Hydrangeaceae Dumort., nom. cons.
  - Loasaceae Juss., nom. cons.
- Ericales Bercht. & J.Presl
  - Mitrastemonaceae Makino, nom. cons.
  - Tetrameristaceae Hutch.
  - Marcgraviaceae Bercht. & J.Presl, nom. cons.
  - Balsaminaceae A.Rich., nom. cons.
  - Lecythidaceae A.Rich., nom. cons.
  - Fouquieriaceae DC., nom. cons.
  - Polemoniaceae Juss., nom. cons.
  - Ebenaceae Gürke, nom. cons.
  - Primulaceae Batsch ex Borkh., nom. cons.
  - Pentaphylacaceae Engl., nom. cons.
  - Sapotaceae Juss., nom. cons.
  - Theaceae Mirb., nom. cons.
  - Symplocaceae Desf., nom. cons.
  - Diapensiaceae Lindl., nom. cons.
  - Styracaceae DC. & Spreng., nom. cons.
  - Sarraceniaceae Dumort., nom. cons.
  - Roridulaceae Martinov, nom. cons.
  - Actinidiaceae Gilg & Werderm., nom. cons.
  - Clethraceae Klotzsch, nom. cons.
  - Cyrillaceae Lindl., nom. cons.
  - Ericaceae Juss., nom. cons.

==== Lamiids ====
- Cardiopteridales Takht.
  - Cardiopteridaceae Blume, nom. cons.
  - Stemonuraceae Kårehed
- Garryales Mart.
  - Eucommiaceae Engl., nom. cons.
  - Garryaceae Lindl., nom. cons.
- Aquifoliales Senft (excluding Cardiopteridaceae Blume, Stemonuraceae Kårehed)
  - Helwingiaceae Decne. (including Phyllonomaceae Small)
  - Aquifoliaceae Bercht. & J.Presl, nom. cons.
- Icacinales Tiegh. (excluding Cassinopsis Sond., Oncothecaceae Kobuski ex Airy Shaw)
  - Icacinaceae Miers, nom. cons.
- Vahliales Doweld
  - Vahliaceae Dandy
- Solanales Juss. ex Bercht. & J.Presl
  - Montiniaceae Nakai, nom. cons.
  - Sphenocleaceae T.Baskerv., nom. cons.
  - Hydroleaceae R.Br.
  - Convolvulaceae Juss., nom. cons.
  - Solanaceae Juss., nom. cons.
- Boraginales Juss. ex Bercht. & J.Presl
  - Boraginaceae Juss., nom. cons. (including Coldeniaceae J.S.Mill. & Gottschling, Namaceae Molinari)
- Gentianales Juss. ex Bercht. & J.Presl
  - Gelsemiaceae L.Struwe & V.A.Albert
  - Gentianaceae Juss., nom. cons.
  - Loganiaceae R.Br. ex Mart., nom. cons.
  - Apocynaceae Juss., nom. cons.
  - Rubiaceae Juss., nom. cons.
- Lamiales Bromhead
  - Plocospermataceae Hutch.
  - Carlemanniaceae Airy Shaw
  - Oleaceae Hoffmanns. & Link, nom. cons.
  - Tetrachondraceae Wettst.
  - Gesneriaceae Rich. & Juss., nom. cons. (including Calceolariaceae Olmstead, Peltantheraceae Molinari-Novoa)
  - Plantaginaceae Juss., nom. cons.
  - Byblidaceae Domin, nom. cons.
  - Linderniaceae Borsch et al.
  - Scrophulariaceae Juss., nom. cons.
  - Stilbaceae Kunth, nom. cons.
  - Lentibulariaceae Rich., nom. cons.
  - Thomandersiaceae Sreem.
  - Pedaliaceae R.Br., nom. cons.
  - Acanthaceae Juss., nom. cons.
  - Schlegeliaceae Reveal
  - Verbenaceae J.St.Hil., nom. cons.
  - Martyniaceae Horan., nom. cons.
  - Bignoniaceae Juss., nom. cons.
  - Orobanchaceae Vent., nom. cons. (including Mazaceae Reveal, Paulowniaceae Nakai, Phrymaceae Schauer, Rehmanniaceae G.Kunkel ex Reveal, Wightiaceae Bo Li et al.)
  - Lamiaceae Martinov, nom. cons. (= Labiatae Juss., nom. cons.)

==== Campanulids ====
- Oncothecales Doweld
  - Oncothecaceae Kobuski ex Airy Shaw
- Metteniusales Takht. (including Cassinopsis Sond.)
  - Metteniusaceae H.Karst. ex Schnizl.
- Bruniales Dumort. (excluding Columelliaceae D.Don)
  - Bruniaceae R.Br. ex DC., nom. cons.
- Asterales Link
  - Rousseaceae DC.
  - Pentaphragmataceae J.Agardh, nom. cons.
  - Campanulaceae Juss., nom. cons.
  - Stylidiaceae R.Br., nom. cons.
  - Phellinaceae Takht.
  - Alseuosmiaceae Airy Shaw
  - Argophyllaceae Takht.
  - Menyanthaceae Dumort., nom. cons.
  - Goodeniaceae R.Br., nom. cons.
  - Calyceraceae R.Br. ex Rich., nom. cons.
  - Asteraceae Bercht. & J.Presl, nom. cons., nom. alt. (= Compositae Giseke, nom. cons., nom. alt.)
- Unplaced to order
  - Columelliaceae D.Don, nom. cons.
- Escalloniales Link
  - Escalloniaceae R.Br. ex Dumort., nom. cons.
- Paracryphiales Takht. ex Reveal
  - Paracryphiaceae Airy Shaw
- Dipsacales Juss. ex Bercht. & J.Presl
  - Viburnaceae Raf., nom. cons. [Adoxaceae E.Mey, nom. cons.]
  - Caprifoliaceae Juss., nom. cons.
- Apiales Nakai
  - Pennantiaceae J.Agardh
  - Torricelliaceae Hu
  - Griseliniaceae Takht., nom. cons.
  - Pittosporaceae R.Br., nom. cons.
  - Araliaceae Juss., nom. cons.
  - Myodocarpaceae Doweld
  - Apiaceae Lindl., nom. cons., nom. alt. (= Umbelliferae Juss., nom. cons., nom. alt.)

=== incertae sedis ===
- Atrichodendron Gagnep.
- Gumillea Ruiz & Pav. (possibly Picramniales or Huerteales)
- Keithia Spreng.
- Poilanedora Gagnep. (possibly Zygophyllales)

== Phylogeny ==
APG V adopts a phylogenetic tree such as the following:

- Angiosperms
  - Amborellales
  - - Nymphaeales
    - - Austrobaileyales
      - - - Magnoliids
            - Chloranthales
            - - - Canellales
                - Piperales
              - - Magnoliales
                - Laurales
          - Monocots
            - Acorales
            - - Alismatales
              - - Petrosaviales
                - - Dioscoreales
                  - Pandanales
                - - - Liliales
                    - Asparagales
                  - Commelinids
                    - Arecales
                    - - - Zingiberales
                        - Commelinales
                      - Poales
        - - Ceratophyllales
          - Eudicots
            - Ranunculales
            - - Trochodendrales
              - Buxales
              - Core eudicots

- Core eudicots
  - Gunnerales
  - Dilleniales
  - - Superrosids
      - Vitales
      - - Saxifragales
        - Rosids
          - - Crossosomatales
            - Geraniales
          - - Zygophyllales
            - Myrtales
            - - Fabids
                - - Fagales
                  - Fabales
                - - Cucurbitales
                  - Rosales
              - Malvids
                - Picramniales
                - - - Celastrales
                    - Huaceae
                    - Malpighiales
                  - - Huerteales
                    - - Oxalidales
                      - - Sapindales
                        - - Brassicales
                          - Malvales
    - Santalales
    - Caryophyllales
    - Superasterids
      - Berberidopsidales
      - Asterids
        - - Cornales
          - Ericales
        - - Lamiids
            - Cardiopteridales
            - - Garryales
              - Aquifoliales
              - - Icacinales
                - - - Vahliales
                    - Solanales
                    - - Boraginales
                      - Gentianales
                  - Lamiales
          - Campanulids
            - Oncothecales
            - Metteniusales
            - Bruniales
            - - Asterales
              - - - Columelliaceae
                  - - Escalloniales
                    - Paracryphiales
                  - Dipsacales
                - Apiales
