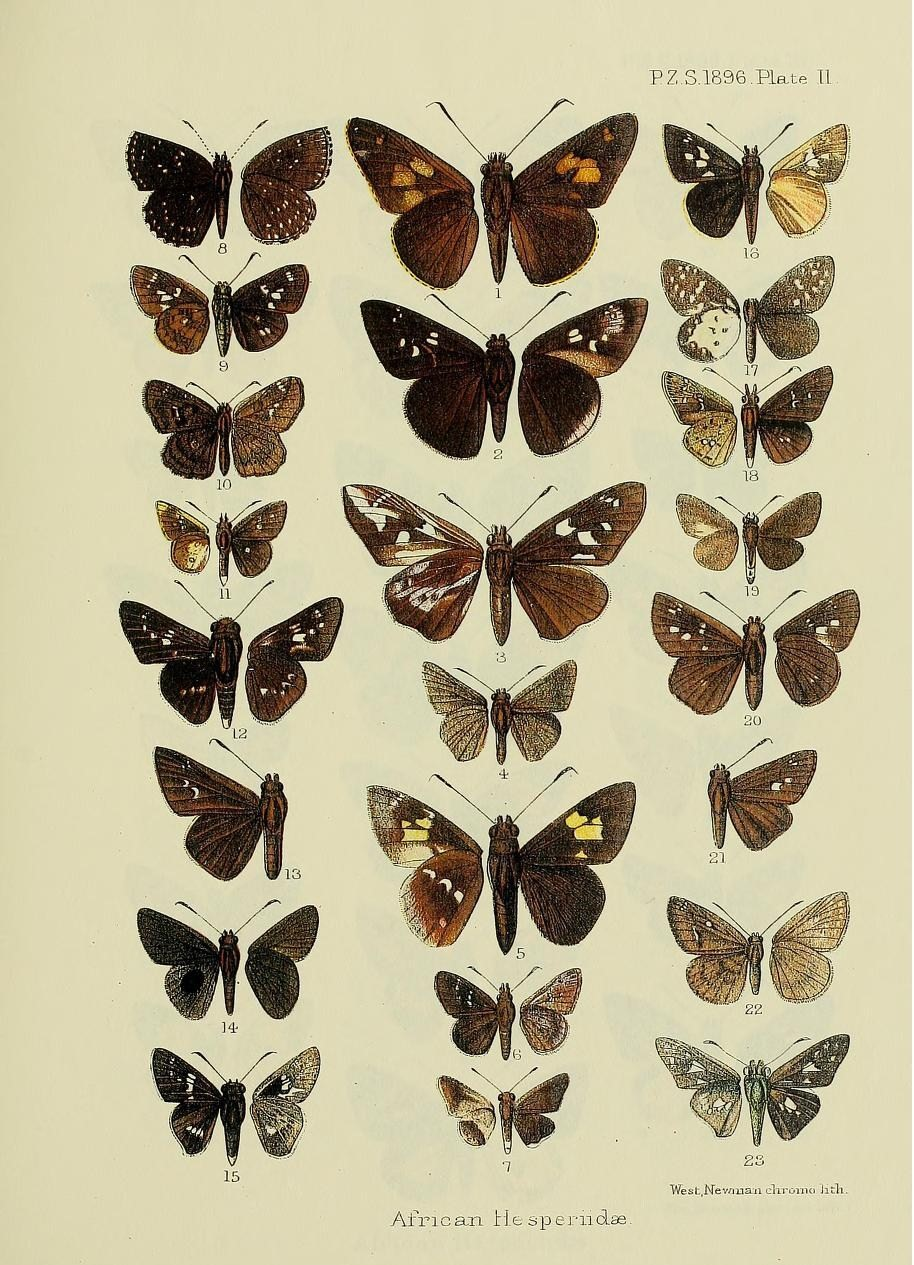
- Figure 14

Scientific classification
- Kingdom: Animalia
- Phylum: Arthropoda
- Clade: Pancrustacea
- Class: Insecta
- Order: Lepidoptera
- Family: Hesperiidae
- Genus: Semalea
- Species: S. pulvina

Binomial name
- Semalea pulvina (Plötz, 1879)

Synonyms
- Hesperia pulvina Plötz, 1879; Hesperia ilias Plötz, 1879; Hesperia tenebricosa Plötz, 1882; Cobalus carbo Mabille, 1890; Ceratrichia paucipunctata Bethune-Baker, 1908; Baoris ilias ab. punctifera Strand, 1913

= Semalea pulvina =

Species of butterfly

Semalea pulvina, the silky dart, silky skipper or branded silky skipper, is a butterfly in the family Hesperiidae. It is found in Senegal, Guinea-Bissau, Guinea, Sierra Leone, Liberia, Ivory Coast, Ghana, Togo, Nigeria, Cameroon, Gabon, the Republic of the Congo, the Democratic Republic of the Congo, Uganda, western Kenya, Tanzania, Malawi, northern Zambia, Mozambique and eastern Zimbabwe. The habitat consists of forests.

Adults have been recorded feeding on blossoms of Syzygium cordatum. They are on wing from August to September and from February to May.

The larvae feed on Siphonochilus aethiopicus and Aframomum species.

Torben Larsen developed a species numbering system for his 2005 publication Butterflies of West Africa. This species is #1345. The 'Larsen' numbers have since been used with permission in A Sharp Eye on Butterflies of Ghana.
