= List of Magnoliales of South Africa =

Flowering plants in the order Magnoliales recorded from South Africa

Magnoliales is an order of flowering plants with six families. The APG system (1998), APG II system (2003), and APG III system (2009) place this order in the clade magnoliids: In these systems, the Magnoliales are a basal group, excluded from the eudicots.

The anthophytes are a grouping of plant taxa bearing flower-like reproductive structures. They were formerly thought to be a clade comprising plants bearing flower-like structures. The group contained the angiosperms - the extant flowering plants, such as roses and grasses - as well as the Gnetales and the extinct Bennettitales.

23,420 species of vascular plant have been recorded in South Africa, making it the sixth most species-rich country in the world and the most species-rich country on the African continent. Of these, 153 species are considered to be threatened. Nine biomes have been described in South Africa: Fynbos, Succulent Karoo, desert, Nama Karoo, grassland, savanna, Albany thickets, the Indian Ocean coastal belt, and forests.

The 2018 South African National Biodiversity Institute's National Biodiversity Assessment plant checklist lists 35,130 taxa in the phyla Anthocerotophyta (hornworts (6)), Anthophyta (flowering plants (33534)), Bryophyta (mosses (685)), Cycadophyta (cycads (42)), Lycopodiophyta (Lycophytes(45)), Marchantiophyta (liverworts (376)), Pinophyta (conifers (33)), and Pteridophyta (cryptogams (408)).

One family is represented in the literature. Listed taxa include species, subspecies, varieties, and forms as recorded, some of which have subsequently been allocated to other taxa as synonyms, in which cases the accepted taxon is appended to the listing. Multiple entries under alternative names reflect taxonomic revision over time.

== Annonaceae ==
Family: Annonaceae,

=== Annona ===
Genus Annona:

- Annona senegalensis Pers. indigenous
- Annona senegalensis Pers. subsp. senegalensis, indigenous

=== Artabotrys ===
Genus Artabotrys:

- Artabotrys aurantiacus Engl. & Diels, accepted as Artabotrys aurantiacus Engl. & Diels var. aurantiacus
- Artabotrys brachypetalus Benth. indigenous
- Artabotrys monteiroae Oliv. indigenous

=== Hexalobus ===
Genus Hexalobus:

- Hexalobus monopetalus (A.Rich.) Engl. & Diels, indigenous
  - Hexalobus monopetalus (A.Rich.) Engl. & Diels var. monopetalus, indigenous

=== Monanthotaxis ===
Genus Monanthotaxis:

- Monanthotaxis caffra (Sond.) Verdc. indigenous

=== Monodora ===
Genus Monodora:

- Monodora junodii Engl. & Diels, indigenous
  - Monodora junodii Engl. & Diels var. junodii, indigenous
  - Monodora junodii Engl. & Diels var. macrantha Paiva, indigenous

=== Uvaria ===
Genus Uvaria:

- Uvaria caffra E.Mey. ex Sond. indigenous
- Uvaria gracilipes N.Robson, indigenous
- Uvaria lucida Benth. indigenous
  - Uvaria lucida Benth. subsp. virens (N.E.Br.) Verdc. indigenous

=== Xylopia ===
Genus Xylopia:

- Xylopia parviflora (A.Rich.) Benth. indigenous
