= Semalea kola =

Scientific classification
- Domain: Eukaryota
- Kingdom: Animalia
- Phylum: Arthropoda
- Class: Insecta
- Order: Lepidoptera
- Family: Hesperiidae
- Genus: Semalea
- Species: S. kola

Binomial name
- Semalea kola Evans, 1937

Species of butterfly

Semalea kola, Evans' silky skipper, is a butterfly in the family Hesperiidae. It is found in Nigeria (the Cross River loop) and Cameroon. The habitat consists of wet forests.
