= List of Dipsacales of South Africa =

Flowering plants in the order Dipsacales recorded from South Africa

The Dipsacales are an order of flowering plants, included within the asterid group of dicotyledons. In the APG III system of 2009, the order includes only two families, Adoxaceae and a broadly defined Caprifoliaceae. Some well-known members of the Dipsacales order are honeysuckle, elder, viburnum, and valerian.

Under the Cronquist system, the order included Adoxaceae, Caprifoliaceae sensu stricto, Dipsacaceae, and Valerianaceae. Under the 2003 APG II system, the circumscription of the order was much the same but the system allowed either a broadly circumscribed Caprifoliaceae including the families Diervillaceae, Dipsacaceae, Linnaeaceae, Morinaceae, and Valerianaceae, or these families being kept separate. The APG III system only uses the broadly circumscribed Caprifoliceae.

The anthophytes are a grouping of plant taxa bearing flower-like reproductive structures. They were formerly thought to be a clade comprising plants bearing flower-like structures. The group contained the angiosperms - the extant flowering plants, such as roses and grasses - as well as the Gnetales and the extinct Bennettitales.

23,420 species of vascular plant have been recorded in South Africa, making it the sixth most species-rich country in the world and the most species-rich country on the African continent. Of these, 153 species are considered to be threatened. Nine biomes have been described in South Africa: Fynbos, Succulent Karoo, desert, Nama Karoo, grassland, savanna, Albany thickets, the Indian Ocean coastal belt, and forests.

The 2018 South African National Biodiversity Institute's National Biodiversity Assessment plant checklist lists 35,130 taxa in the phyla Anthocerotophyta (hornworts (6)), Anthophyta (flowering plants (33534)), Bryophyta (mosses (685)), Cycadophyta (cycads (42)), Lycopodiophyta (Lycophytes(45)), Marchantiophyta (liverworts (376)), Pinophyta (conifers (33)), and Pteridophyta (cryptogams (408)).

Three families are represented in the literature. Listed taxa include species, subspecies, varieties, and forms as recorded, some of which have subsequently been allocated to other taxa as synonyms, in which cases the accepted taxon is appended to the listing. Multiple entries under alternative names reflect taxonomic revision over time.

== Caprifoliaceae ==
- Family: Caprifoliaceae,

=== Lonicera ===
Genus Lonicera:

- Lonicera japonica Thunb. not indigenous, naturalised
  - Lonicera japonica Thunb. var. japonica, not indigenous, naturalised

=== Sambucus ===
Genus Sambucus:

- Sambucus canadensis L. not indigenous, naturalised, invasive
- Sambucus nigra L. not indigenous, naturalised, invasive
  - Sambucus nigra L. var. canadensis (L.) B.L.Turner, accepted as Sambucus canadensis L. not indigenous, naturalised

== Dipsacaceae ==
- Family: Dipsacaceae,

=== Cephalaria ===
Genus Cephalaria:

- Cephalaria armerioides Szabo, endemic
- Cephalaria attenuata (L.f.) Roem. & Schult. endemic
- Cephalaria decurrens (Thunb.) Roem. & Schult. endemic
- Cephalaria foliosa Compton, indigenous
- Cephalaria galpiniana Szabo, indigenous
  - Cephalaria galpiniana Szabo subsp. galpiniana, indigenous
  - Cephalaria galpiniana Szabo subsp. simplicior B.L.Burtt, indigenous
- Cephalaria humilis (Thunb.) Roem. & Schult. endemic
- Cephalaria natalensis Kuntze, indigenous
- Cephalaria oblongifolia (Kuntze) Szabo, indigenous
- Cephalaria pungens Szabo, indigenous
- Cephalaria rigida (L.) Roem. & Schult. endemic
- Cephalaria scabra (L.f.) Roem. & Schult. endemic
- Cephalaria wilmsiana Szabo, endemic
- Cephalaria zeyheriana Szabo, indigenous

=== Scabiosa ===
Genus Scabiosa:

- Scabiosa africana L. endemic
- Scabiosa albanensis R.A.Dyer, endemic
- Scabiosa angustiloba (Sond.) Hutch. endemic
- Scabiosa buekiana Eckl. & Zeyh. endemic
- Scabiosa columbaria L. indigenous
- Scabiosa drakensbergensis B.L.Burtt, indigenous
- Scabiosa incisa Mill. endemic
- Scabiosa lanata Hill, accepted as Hermas lanata (Hill) Magee
- Scabiosa transvaalensis S.Moore, endemic
- Scabiosa tysonii L.Bolus, endemic

== Valerianaceae ==
- Family: Valerianaceae,

=== Centranthus ===
Genus Centranthus:

- Centranthus ruber (L.) DC. not indigenous, naturalised, invasive

=== Valeriana ===
Genus Valeriana:

- Valeriana capensis Thunb. indigenous
  - Valeriana capensis Thunb. var. capensis, indigenous
  - Valeriana capensis Thunb. var. lanceolata N.E.Br. indigenous
  - Valeriana capensis Thunb. var. nana B.L.Burtt, indigenous
