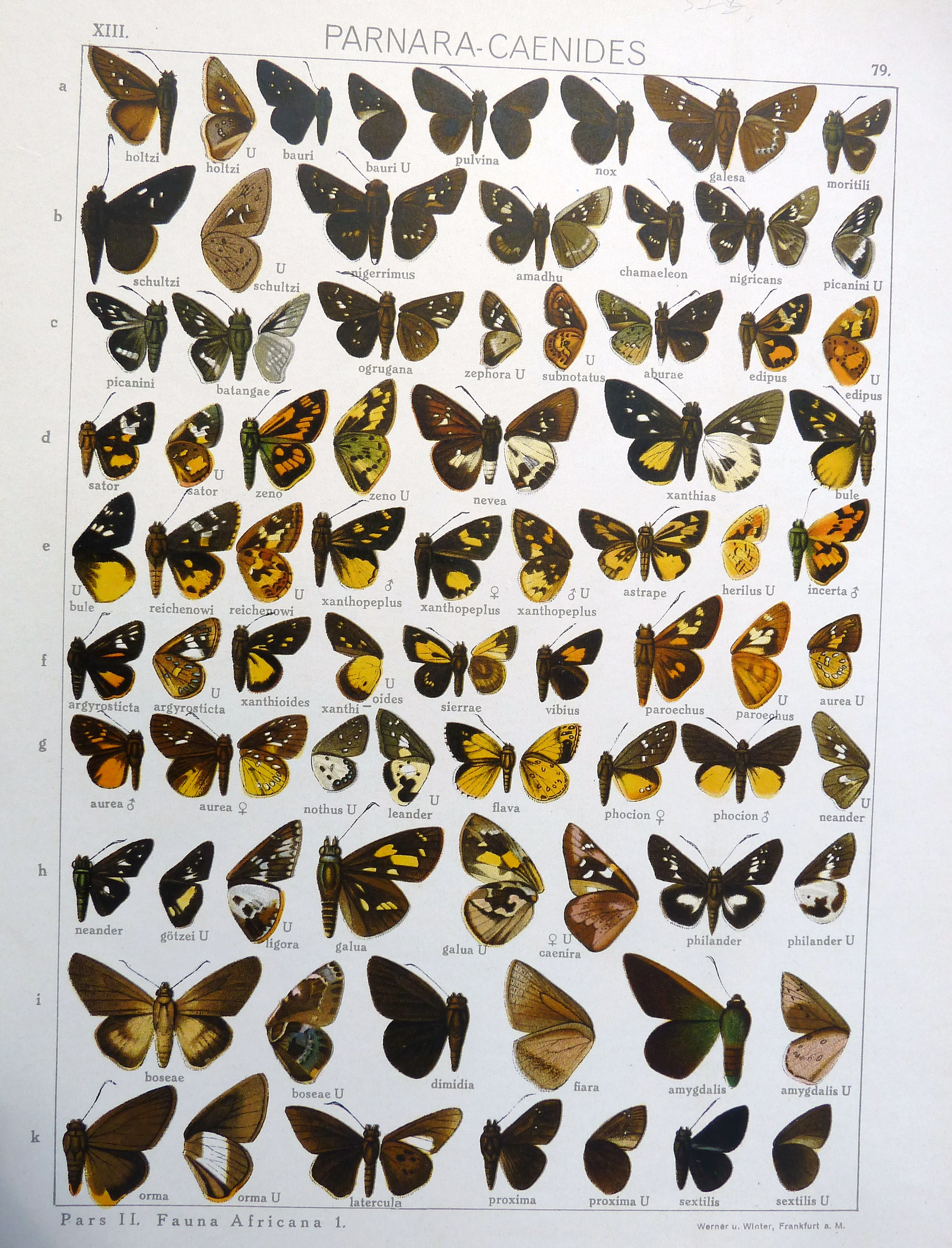

Scientific classification
- Domain: Eukaryota
- Kingdom: Animalia
- Phylum: Arthropoda
- Class: Insecta
- Order: Lepidoptera
- Family: Hesperiidae
- Genus: Semalea
- Species: S. sextilis

Binomial name
- Semalea sextilis (Plötz, 1886)

Synonyms
- Hesperia sextilis Plötz, 1886; Cobalus corvinus Mabille, 1890; Semalea noctula ab. pusillima Strand, 1913

= Semalea sextilis =

Species of butterfly

Semalea sextilis, the dark skipper or silky skipper, is a butterfly in the family Hesperiidae. It is found in Guinea, Sierra Leone, Liberia, Ivory Coast, Ghana, Nigeria, Cameroon, Gabon, the Republic of the Congo, the Central African Republic, the Democratic Republic of the Congo, Uganda, western Kenya, western Tanzania and Zambia. The habitat consists of forests.
