= Siphonochilus kilimanensis =

Conservation status
- Vulnerable (IUCN 3.1)

Scientific classification
- Kingdom: Plantae
- Clade: Tracheophytes
- Clade: Angiosperms
- Clade: Monocots
- Clade: Commelinids
- Order: Zingiberales
- Family: Zingiberaceae
- Genus: Siphonochilus
- Species: S. kilimanensis

Binomial name
- Siphonochilus kilimanensis (Gagnep.) B.L.Burtt

Synonyms
- Cienkowskiella kilimanensis (Gagnep.) Y.K.Kam; Kaempferia kilimanensis Gagnep.; Kaempferia ceciliae N.E.Br.

Species of flowering plant

Siphonochilus kilimanensis is a species of plant in the ginger family, Zingiberaceae. It was first described by François Gagnepain and renamed by Brian Laurence Burtt.
