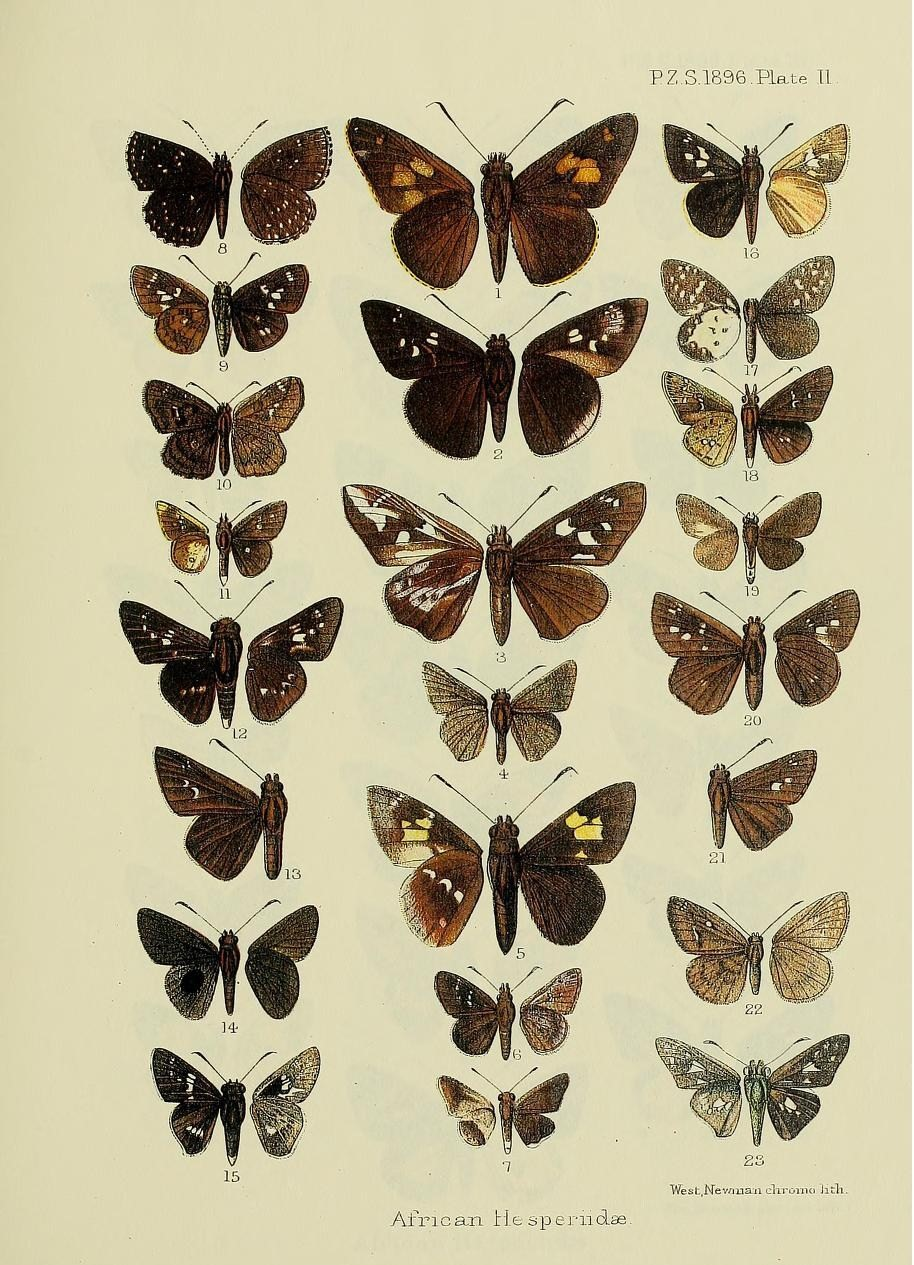
- Semalea arela figure 20

Scientific classification
- Kingdom: Animalia
- Phylum: Arthropoda
- Class: Insecta
- Order: Lepidoptera
- Family: Hesperiidae
- Tribe: Erionotini
- Genus: Semalea; Holland, 1896

= Semalea =

Genus of butterflies

Semalea is a genus of skipper butterflies in the family Hesperiidae.

== Species ==
- Semalea arela (Mabille, 1891)
- Semalea atrio (Mabille, 1891)
- Semalea kola Evans, 1937
- Semalea pulvina (Plötz, 1879)
- Semalea sextilis (Plötz, 1886)

== Species with doubtful status ==
- Semalea proxima (Plötz, 1886) (nomen dubium)
- Semalea bauri (Plötz, 1886) (nomen dubium)
