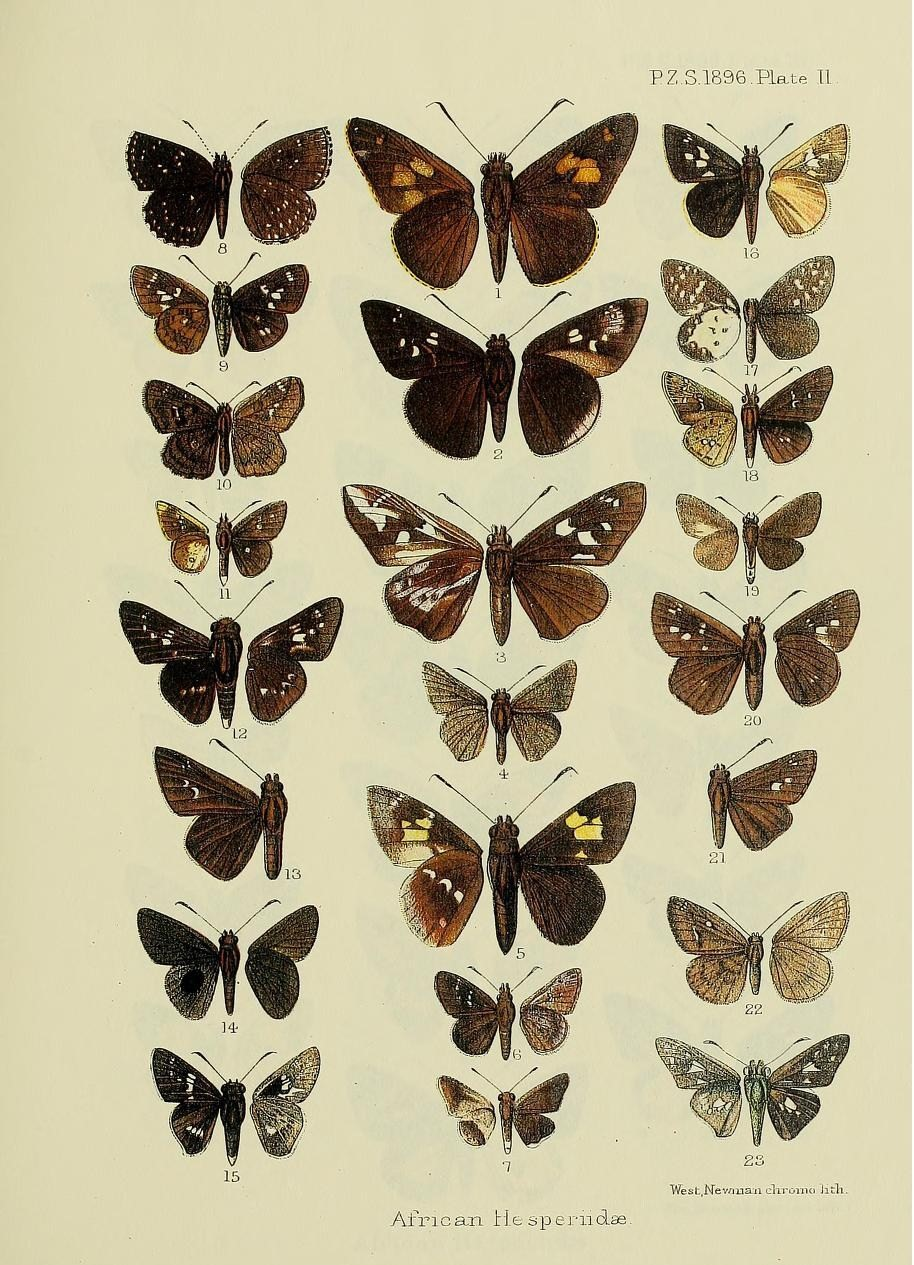
- Figure 20

Scientific classification
- Kingdom: Animalia
- Phylum: Arthropoda
- Class: Insecta
- Order: Lepidoptera
- Family: Hesperiidae
- Genus: Semalea
- Species: S. arela

Binomial name
- Semalea arela (Mabille, 1891)

Synonyms
- Hypoleucis arela Mabille, 1891; Pamphila nox Mabille, 1891; Semalea atimus Holland, 1896 (nomen nudum); Baoris arela ab. defectula Strand, 1913

= Semalea arela =

Species of butterfly

Semalea arela, the Arela dart, Arela skipper or brown silky skipper, is a butterfly in the family Hesperiidae. It is found in Senegal, Guinea, Sierra Leone, Liberia, Ivory Coast, Ghana, Nigeria, Cameroon, the Republic of the Congo, the Central African Republic, the Democratic Republic of the Congo, Uganda, Kenya, Tanzania, Malawi, northern Zambia, Mozambique and eastern Zimbabwe. The habitat consists of forests.

Adults are on wing year round.

The larvae feed on Zingiber, Aframomum, Pennisetum, Setaria and Panicum species.
