= Siphonochilus bambutiorum =

Scientific classification
- Kingdom: Plantae
- Clade: Tracheophytes
- Clade: Angiosperms
- Clade: Monocots
- Clade: Commelinids
- Order: Zingiberales
- Family: Zingiberaceae
- Genus: Siphonochilus
- Species: S. bambutiorum

Binomial name
- Siphonochilus bambutiorum A.D.Poulsen & Lock

Species of flowering plant

Siphonochilus bambutiorum is a species of plant in the ginger family, Zingiberaceae. It was first described by Axel Dalberg Poulsen and John Michael Lock.
