= Siphonochilus brachystemon =

Scientific classification
- Kingdom: Plantae
- Clade: Tracheophytes
- Clade: Angiosperms
- Clade: Monocots
- Clade: Commelinids
- Order: Zingiberales
- Family: Zingiberaceae
- Genus: Siphonochilus
- Species: S. brachystemon

Binomial name
- Siphonochilus brachystemon (K.Schum.) B.L.Burtt

Species of flowering plant

Siphonochilus bambutiorum is a species of plant in the ginger family, Zingiberaceae. It was first described by Karl Moritz Schumann and renamed by Brian Laurence Burtt.
