= List of Fagales of South Africa =

Flowering plants in the order Fagales recorded from South Africa

The Fagales are an order of flowering plants, including some of the best-known trees. The order name is derived from genus Fagus, beeches. They belong among the rosid group of dicotyledons. The anthophytes are a grouping of plant taxa bearing flower-like reproductive structures. They were formerly thought to be a clade comprising plants bearing flower-like structures. The group contained the angiosperms - the extant flowering plants, such as roses and grasses - as well as the Gnetales and the extinct Bennettitales.

23,420 species of vascular plant have been recorded in South Africa, making it the sixth most species-rich country in the world and the most species-rich country on the African continent. Of these, 153 species are considered to be threatened. Nine biomes have been described in South Africa: Fynbos, Succulent Karoo, desert, Nama Karoo, grassland, savanna, Albany thickets, the Indian Ocean coastal belt, and forests.

The 2018 South African National Biodiversity Institute's National Biodiversity Assessment plant checklist lists 35,130 taxa in the phyla Anthocerotophyta (hornworts (6)), Anthophyta (flowering plants (33534)), Bryophyta (mosses (685)), Cycadophyta (cycads (42)), Lycopodiophyta (Lycophytes(45)), Marchantiophyta (liverworts (376)), Pinophyta (conifers (33)), and Pteridophyta (cryptogams (408)).

Five families are represented in the literature. Listed taxa include species, subspecies, varieties, and forms as recorded, some of which have subsequently been allocated to other taxa as synonyms, in which cases the accepted taxon is appended to the listing. Multiple entries under alternative names reflect taxonomic revision over time.

== Betulaceae ==
Family: Betulaceae,

=== Alnus ===
Genus Alnus:

- Alnus glutinosa (L.) Gaertn., not indigenous, cultivated, naturalised, invasive

=== Betula ===
Genus Betula:

- Betula pendula Roth, not indigenous, cultivated, naturalised

== Casuarinaceae ==
Family: Casuarinaceae,

=== Casuarina ===
Genus Casuarina:

- Casuarina cunninghamiana Miq. not indigenous, naturalised, invasive
- Casuarina equisetifolia L., not indigenous, naturalised, invasive
- Casuarina glauca Spreng. not indigenous, cultivated, naturalised

== Fagaceae ==
Family: Fagaceae,

=== Castanea ===
Genus Castanea:

- Castanea sativa Mill. not indigenous, cultivated, naturalised, invasive

=== Quercus ===
Genus Quercus:

- Quercus palustris Munchh. not indigenous, cultivated, naturalised
- Quercus robur L. not indigenous, cultivated, naturalised, invasive
- Quercus rugosa Nee, not indigenous, cultivated, naturalised
- Quercus suber L. not indigenous, cultivated, naturalised, invasive

== Juglandaceae ==
Family: Juglandaceae,

=== Pterocarya ===
Genus Pterocarya:

- Pterocarya stenoptera C.DC. not indigenous, cultivated, naturalised

== Myricaceae ==
Family: Myricaceae,

=== Morella ===
Genus Morella:

- Morella brevifolia (E.Mey. ex C.DC.) Killick, endemic
- Morella cordifolia (L.) Killick, endemic
- Morella diversifolia (Adamson) Killick, endemic
- Morella humilis (Cham. & Schltdl.) Killick, endemic
- Morella integra (A.Chev.) Killick, endemic
- Morella kraussiana (Buchinger ex Meisn.) Killick, endemic
- Morella microbracteata (Weim.) Verdc. & Polhill, indigenous
- Morella pilulifera (Rendle) Killick, indigenous
- Morella quercifolia (L.) Killick, endemic
- Morella serrata (Lam.) Killick, indigenous

=== Myrica ===
Genus Myrica:

- Myrica brevifolia E.Mey. ex C.DC., accepted as Morella brevifolia (E.Mey. ex C.DC.) Killick, present
- Myrica cordifolia L., accepted as Morella cordifolia (L.) Killick, present
- Myrica diversifolia Adamson, accepted as Morella diversifolia (Adamson) Killick, present
- Myrica humilis Cham. & Schltdl., accepted as Morella humilis (Cham. & Schltdl.) Killick, present
- Myrica integra (A.Chev.) Killick, accepted as Morella integra (A.Chev.) Killick, present
- Myrica kraussiana Buchinger ex Meisn., accepted as Morella kraussiana (Buchinger ex Meisn.) Killick, present
- Myrica pilulifera Rendle, accepted as Morella pilulifera (Rendle) Killick, present
- Myrica quercifolia L., accepted as Morella quercifolia (L.) Killick, present
- Myrica serrata Lam., accepted as Morella serrata (Lam.) Killick, present
