= Semalea atrio =

Scientific classification
- Domain: Eukaryota
- Kingdom: Animalia
- Phylum: Arthropoda
- Class: Insecta
- Order: Lepidoptera
- Family: Hesperiidae
- Genus: Semalea
- Species: S. atrio

Binomial name
- Semalea atrio (Mabille, 1891)

Synonyms
- Cobalus atrio Mabille, 1891

Species of butterfly

Semalea atrio, the small silky skipper, is a butterfly in the family Hesperiidae. It is found in Sierra Leone, Ivory Coast, Ghana, Nigeria, Cameroon, the Central African Republic, the eastern part of the Democratic Republic of the Congo and north-western Tanzania. The habitat consists of primary forests.
