= Atrichodendron =

Scientific classification
- Kingdom: Plantae
- Clade: Tracheophytes
- Clade: Angiosperms
- Clade: Eudicots
- Clade: Asterids
- Order: Solanales
- Family: Solanaceae
- Genus: Atrichodendron; Gagnep.

Genus of flowering plants

Atrichodendron is a genus of flowering plants previously considered to belong to the Solanaceae family. With the publication of APG IV, it is no longer considered part of Solanaceae, and its correct phylogenetic placement is uncertain.

Its native range is Vietnam.

Species:

- Atrichodendron tonkinense Gagnep.
