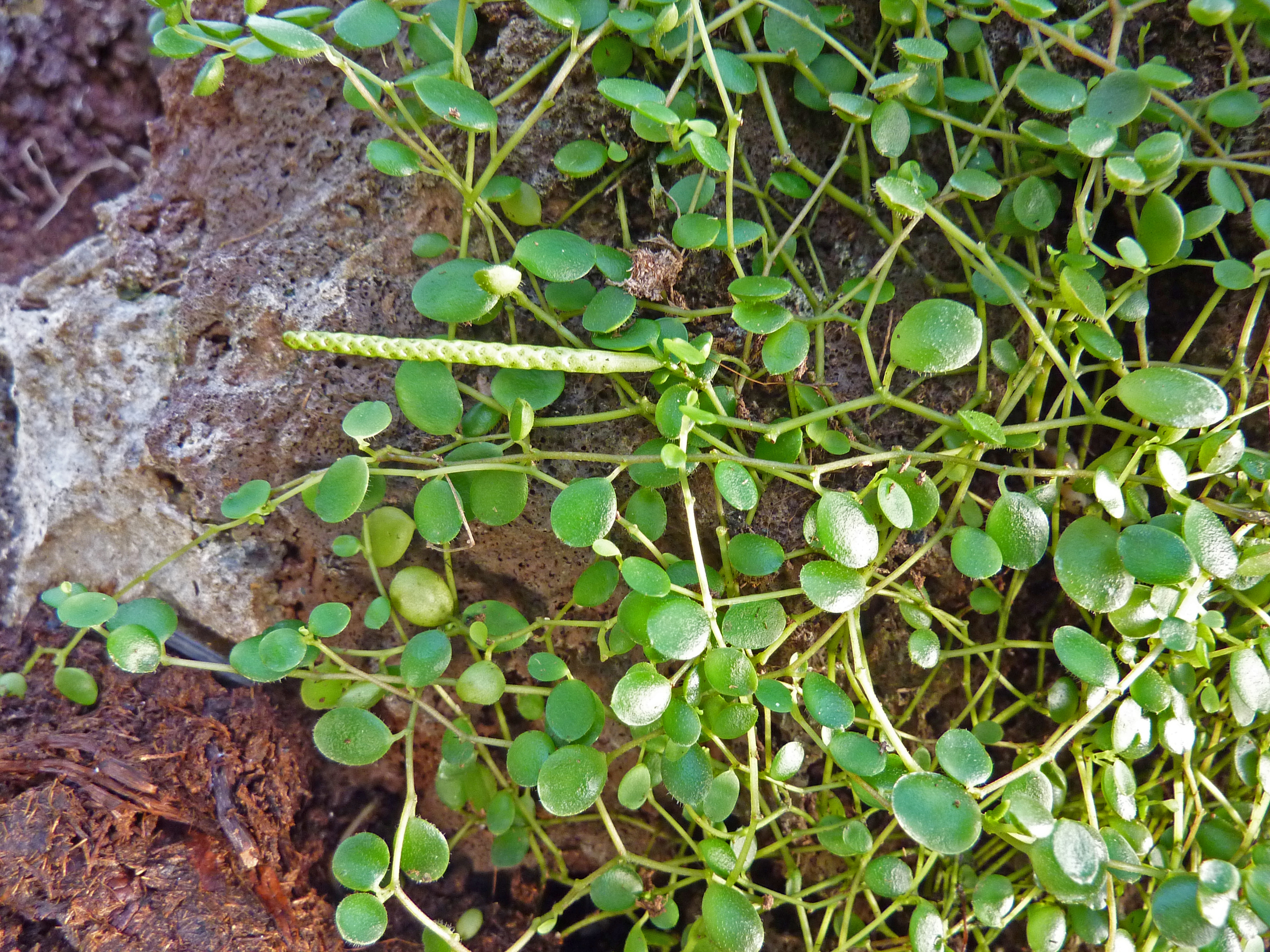

Scientific classification
- Kingdom: Plantae
- Clade: Tracheophytes
- Clade: Angiosperms
- Clade: Magnoliids
- Order: Piperales
- Family: Piperaceae
- Genus: Peperomia
- Species: P. rotundifolia

Binomial name
- Peperomia rotundifolia (L.) Kunth

Synonyms
- List: Acrocarpidium rotundifolium (L.) Miq.; Piper rotundifolium L.; Acrocarpidium brevipes Benth.; Acrocarpidium guayaquillense Miq.; Acrocarpidium mexicanum Miq.; Acrocarpidium nummulariifolium (Sw.) Miq.; Acrocarpidium nummulariifolium var. obcordatum Miq.; Acrocarpidium nummulariifolium f. pilosior Miq.; Peperomia bartlettii C.DC.; Peperomia brevipes (Benth.) C.DC.; Peperomia delicatissima var. venusta Trel.; Peperomia guayaquilensis (Miq.) C.DC.; Peperomia koepperi Trel.; Peperomia lanjouwii Yunck.; Peperomia mararyna C.DC.; Peperomia metapalcoensis C.DC.; Peperomia nummularifolia (Sw.) Kunth; Peperomia nummulariifolia var. obcordata (Miq.) C.DC.; Peperomia nummulariifolia var. pubescens C.DC.; Peperomia rotundifolia Schltdl. & Cham.; Peperomia rotundifolia var. glabrilimba C.DC.; Peperomia rotundifolia var. nummulariifolia (Sw.) Stehlé; Peperomia rotundifolia var. obcordata (Miq.) Dahlst.; Peperomia rotundifolia f. obovata C.DC.; Peperomia rotundifolia var. ovata (Dahlst.) Dahlst.; Peperomia rotundifolia f. ovata Dahlst.; Peperomia rotundifolia var. pilosior (Miq.) C.DC.; Peperomia rotundifolia f. pubescens DC. ex Dahlst.; Peperomia rotundifolia var. subelliptica Trel.; Peperomia rotundifolia var. subglabrilimba C.DC.; Peperomia vernouana Trel.; Piper nummulariifolium Sw.

= Peperomia rotundifolia =

Species of plant

Peperomia rotundifolia, also known as jade necklace, trailing jade, creeping buttons and round leaf Peperomia, is a trailing plant species of peperomia native to the tropical rainforest of South America.

== Characteristics ==
It has hanging shoots and very small, thick and fleshy, succulent, button-like leaves that may entwine and weave in and out of each other. Peperomia rotundifolia has medicinal properties and seems promising for dealing with stomach issues, pain, and internal pests.

=== Habitat ===
An epiphyte, the plant grows in tropical forests in North America and South America on trees and can also be found crawling on rock cracks, rotten logs and the forest ground as well, preferring moisture and shaded conditions. Their USDA hardiness zone is 10a to 11b: from 30 °F (−1.1 °C) to 50 °F (+10 °C).

== Cultivation ==
The plant does best in hanging baskets, where it can cascade, as well as in terrariums. The species requires high humidity, especially when it is warm, though they are very sensitive to overwatering, where they would wilt or have scab-like bumps on their leaves. They grow well in steadily moist soils. Summer temperatures should exceed 24 °C and in winter it should not be lower than 16 °C.

The plant flourishes when it is slightly pot-bound, meaning they should not be over-potted. The plant can be easily propagated from leaf cuttings. They may be susceptible to mealybugs.
