= Erythropalaceae =

Family of flowering plants

Erythropalaceae Planch. ex Miq. is a family of flowering plants. The family has been recognized by few taxonomists, the plants often being included in family Olacaceae.

The APG II system, of 2003 (unchanged from the APG system, of 1998), does not recognize this family.

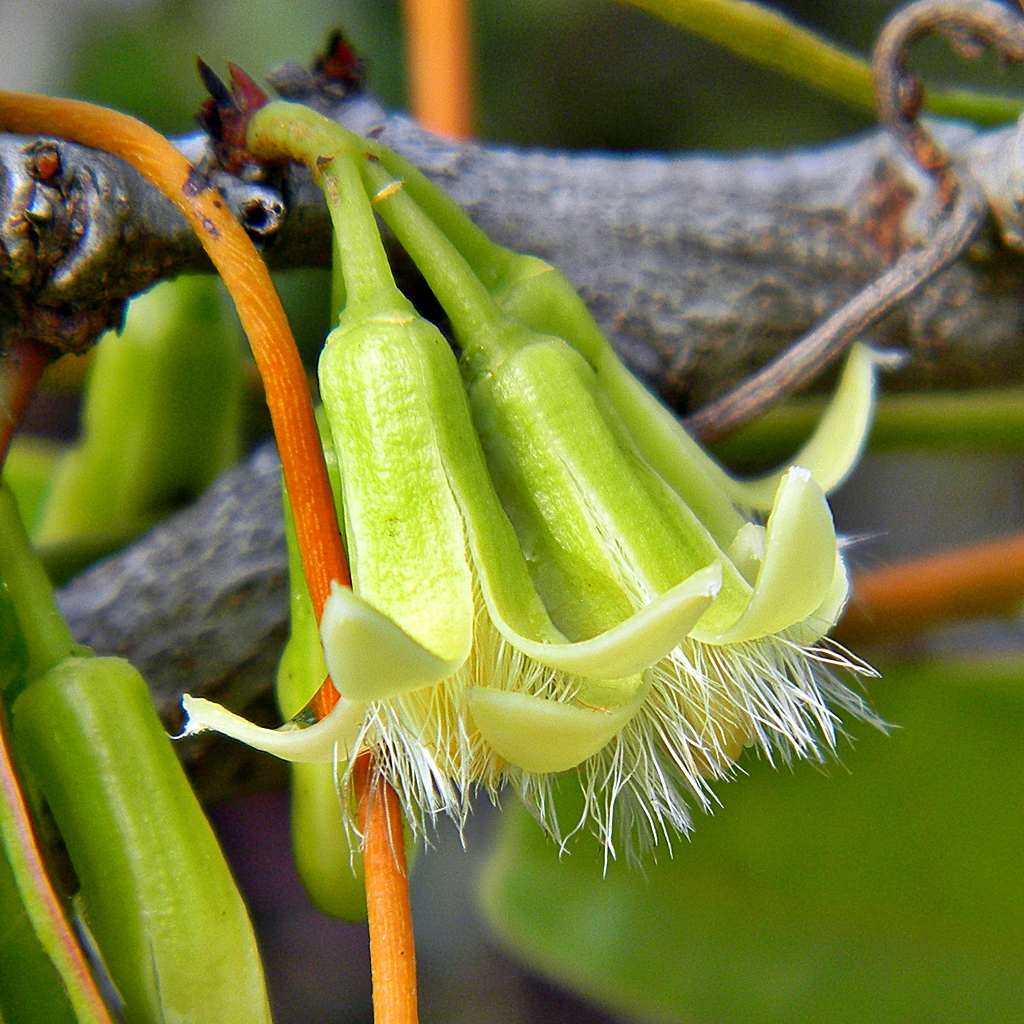
Hog Plum (Ximenia americana)
