= Cassinopsis tinifolia =

Scientific classification
- Kingdom: Plantae
- Clade: Tracheophytes
- Clade: Angiosperms
- Clade: Eudicots
- Clade: Asterids
- Order: Icacinales
- Family: Icacinaceae
- Genus: Cassinopsis
- Species: C. tinifolia

Binomial name
- Cassinopsis tinifolia Harv

Species of shrub

Cassinopsis tinifolia, the false lemon-thorn, is a species of shrub or small tree in the family Icacinaceae. It is found along montane forest margins, wooded gullies, and riverine fringes, in Mozambique, Zimbabwe, Eswatini, and South Africa.

The flowering months of this plant are between October and April.

== Description ==
Cassinopsis tinifolia has a smooth, grey bark and green branches. It grows over 4 meters in height.
