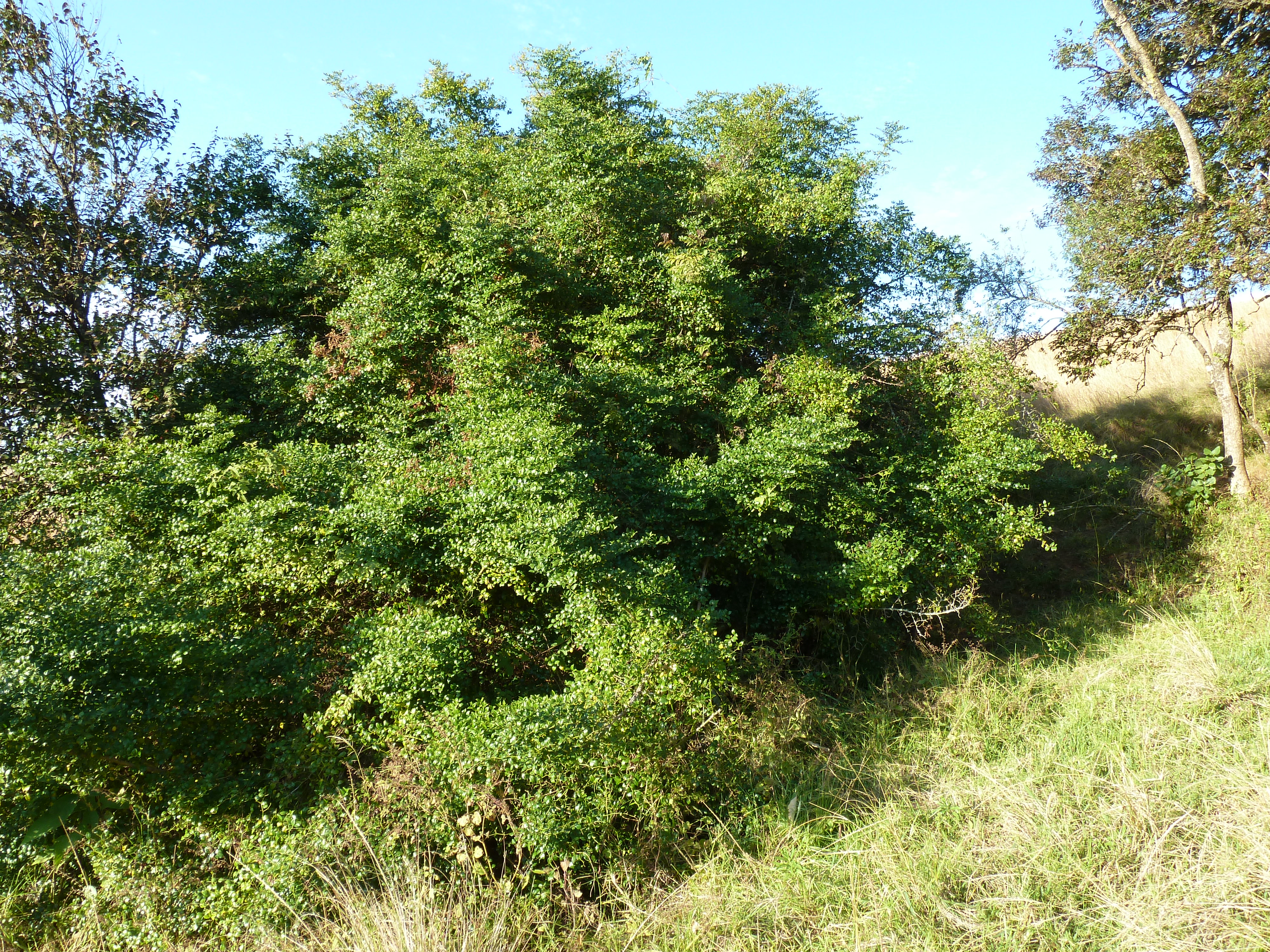

Conservation status
- Least Concern (IUCN 3.1)

Scientific classification
- Kingdom: Plantae
- Clade: Tracheophytes
- Clade: Angiosperms
- Clade: Eudicots
- Clade: Asterids
- Order: Icacinales
- Family: Icacinaceae
- Genus: Cassinopsis
- Species: C. ilicifolia

Binomial name
- Cassinopsis ilicifolia (Hochst.) Sleumer

Synonyms
- Hartogia ilicifolia Hochst.; Ilex dichotoma Bernh.; Cassine ilicifolia Hochst. ex Sond.; Cassine mucronata Turcz.; Cassinopsis capensis Harv. & Sond.

= Cassinopsis ilicifolia =

Lemon thorn

Species of flowering plant

Cassinopsis ilicifolia is a spined, straggling shrub or liane in the family Icacinaceae. It is native to the moister regions of southern Africa. It is named ilicifolia due to the leaves with somewhat serrated leaf margins, which resemble those of the genus Ilex.

== Gallery ==
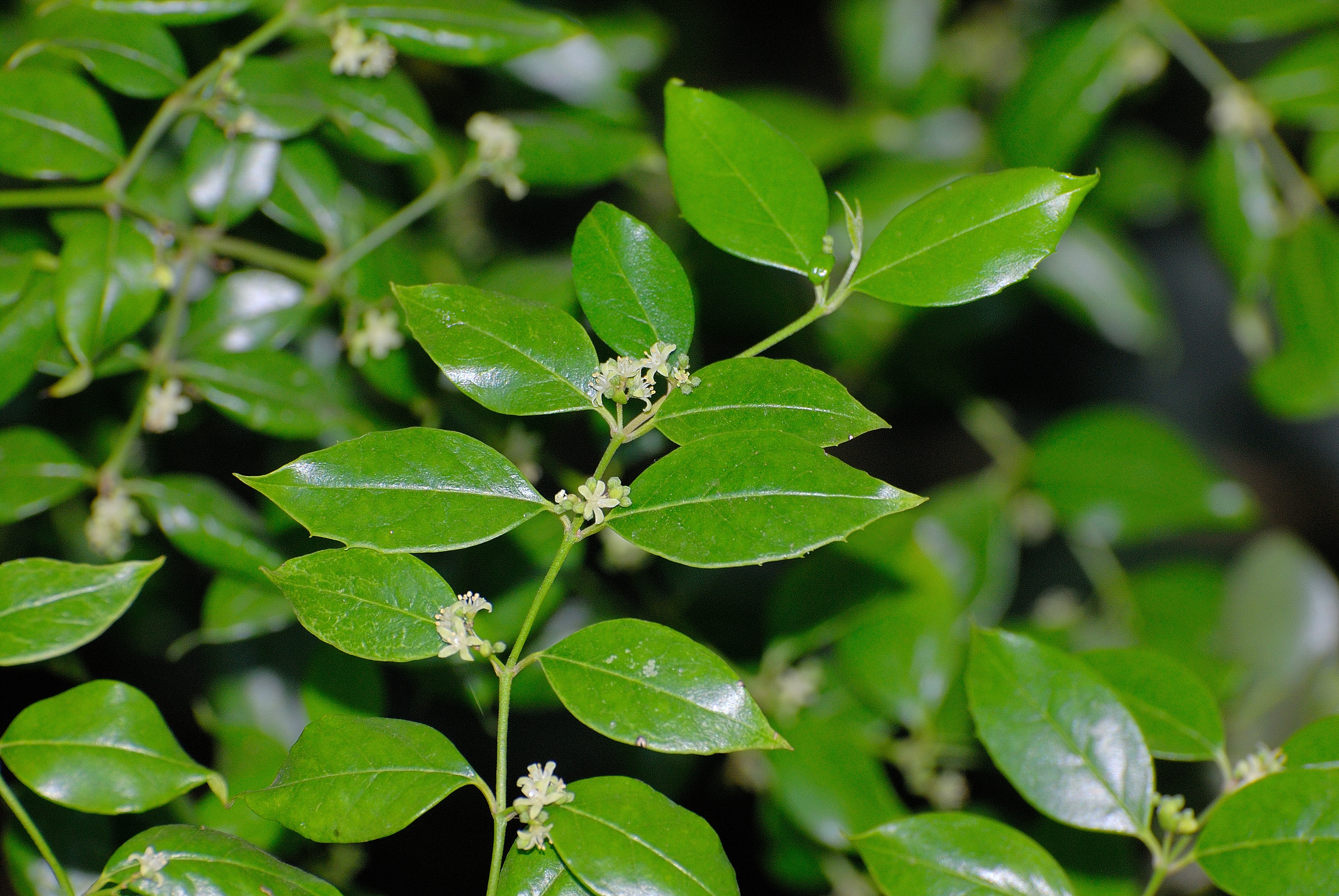
Flowering sprig

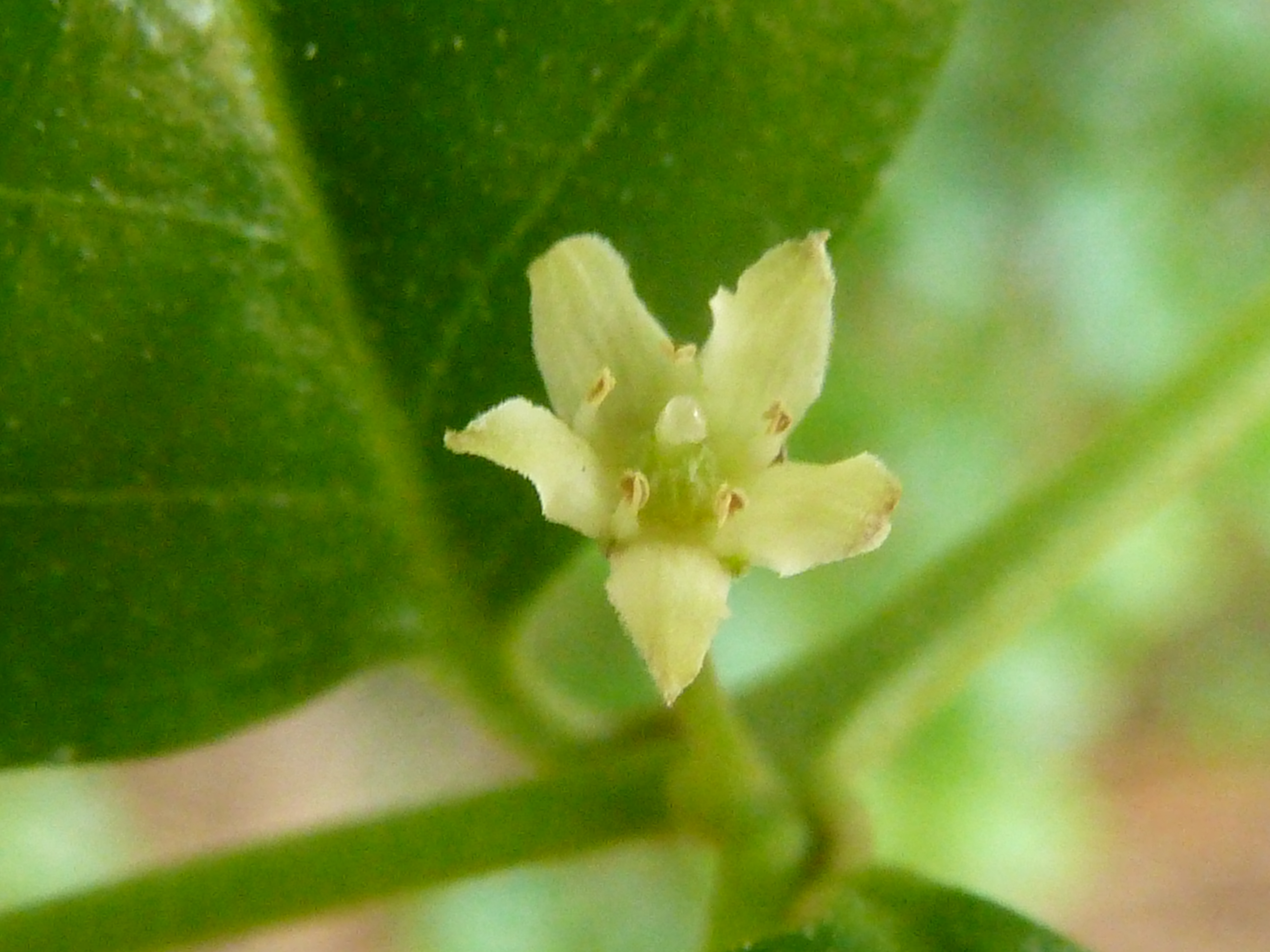
Flower

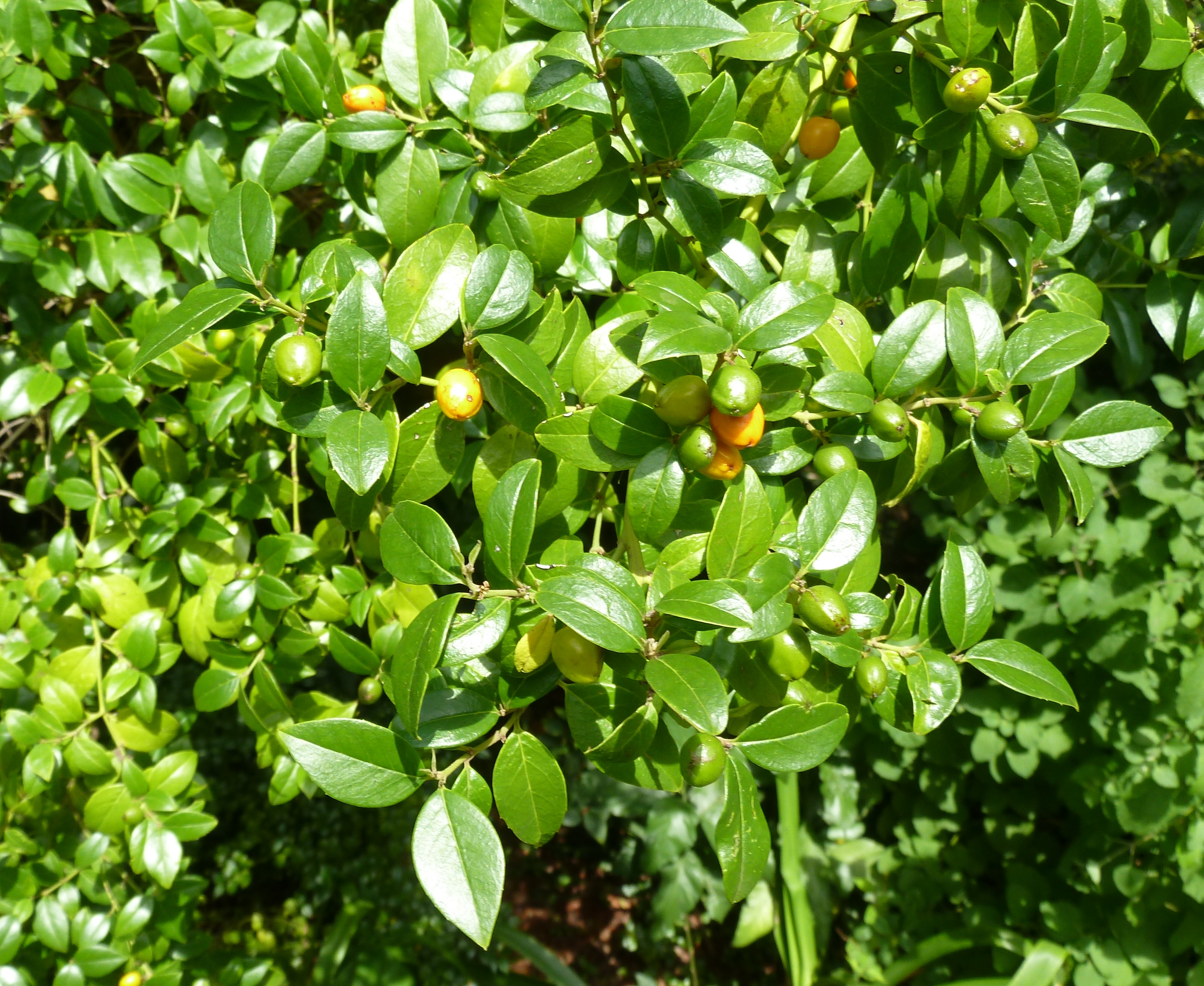
Green and ripe fruit

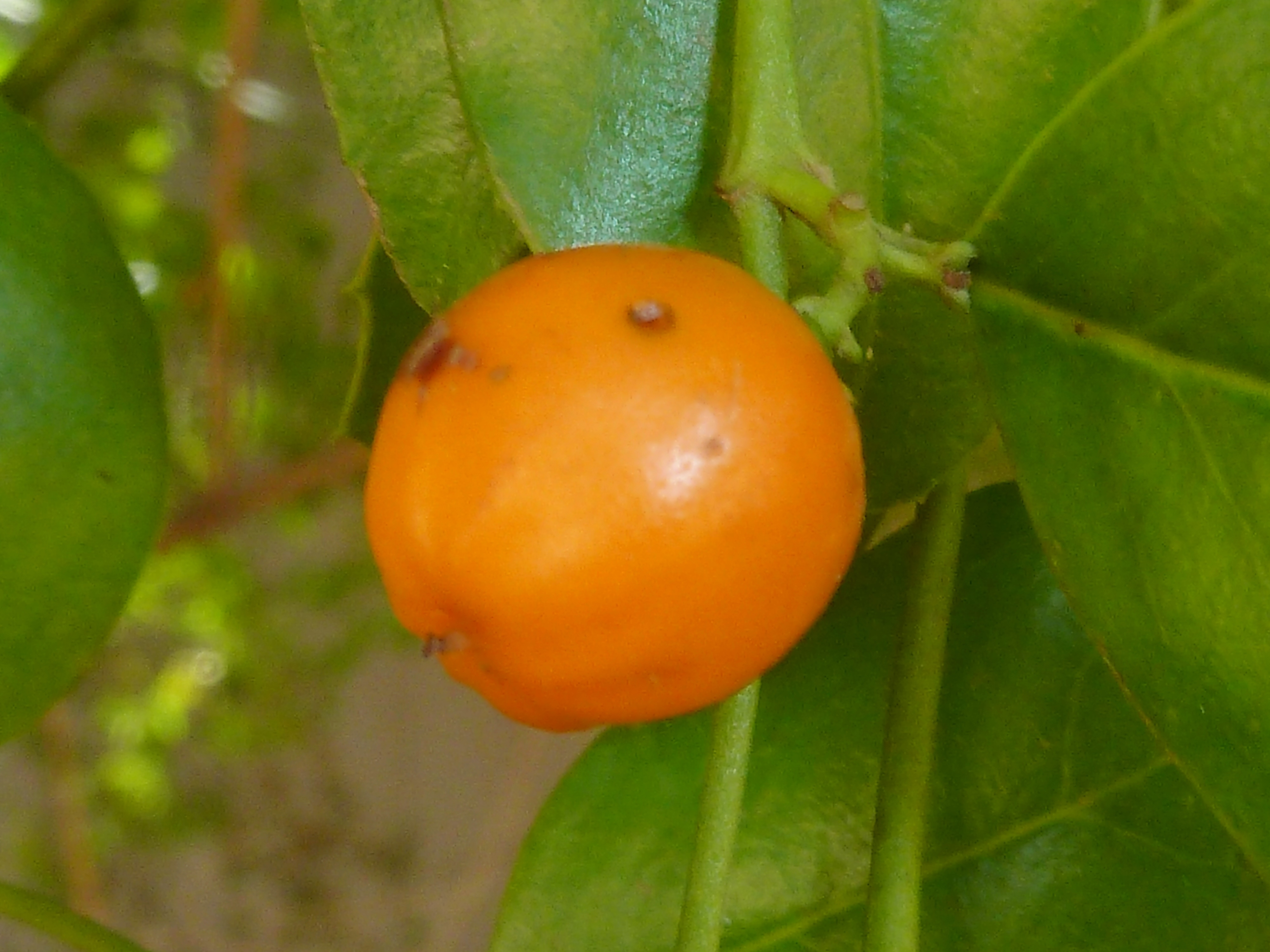
Ripe fruit

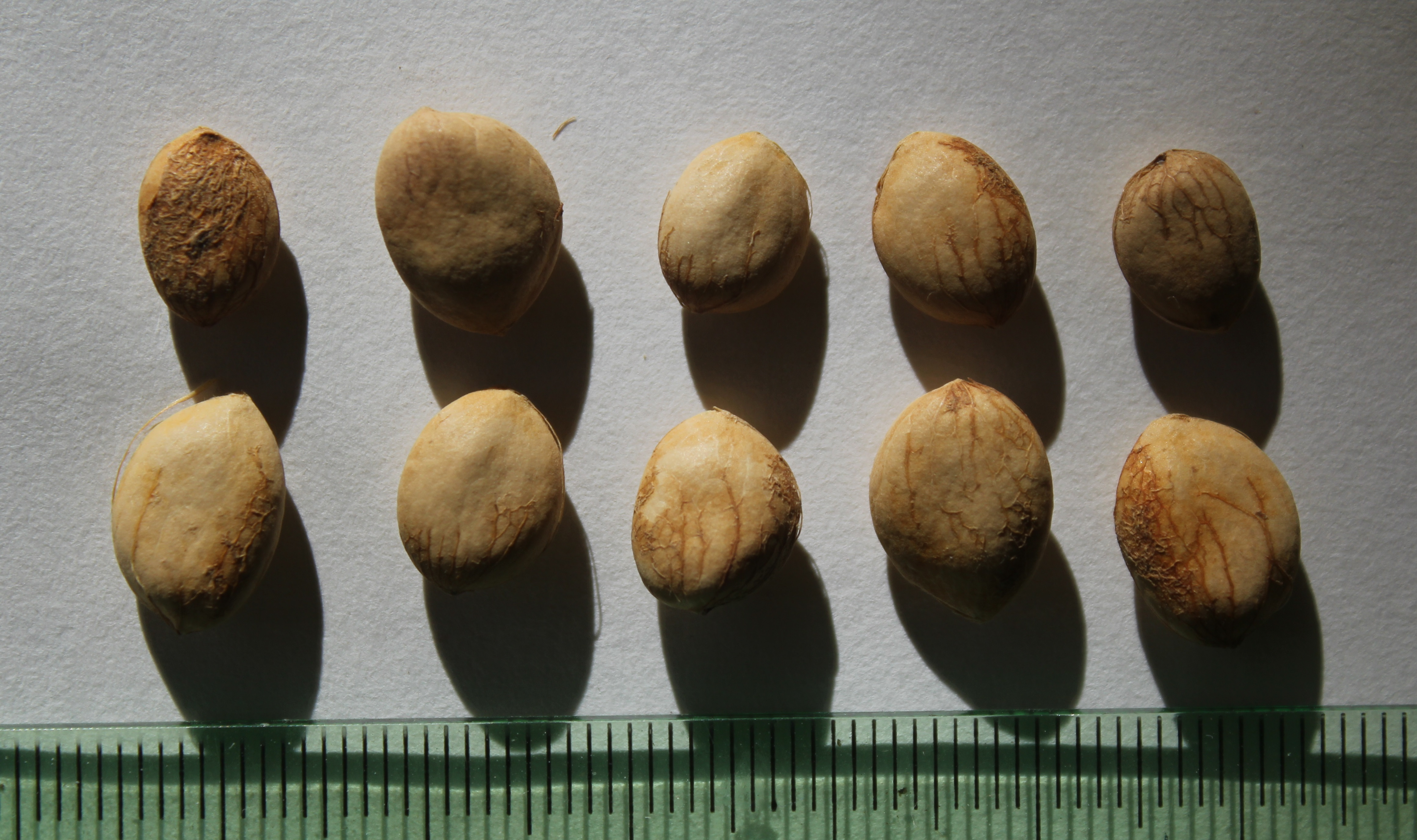
Seeds
