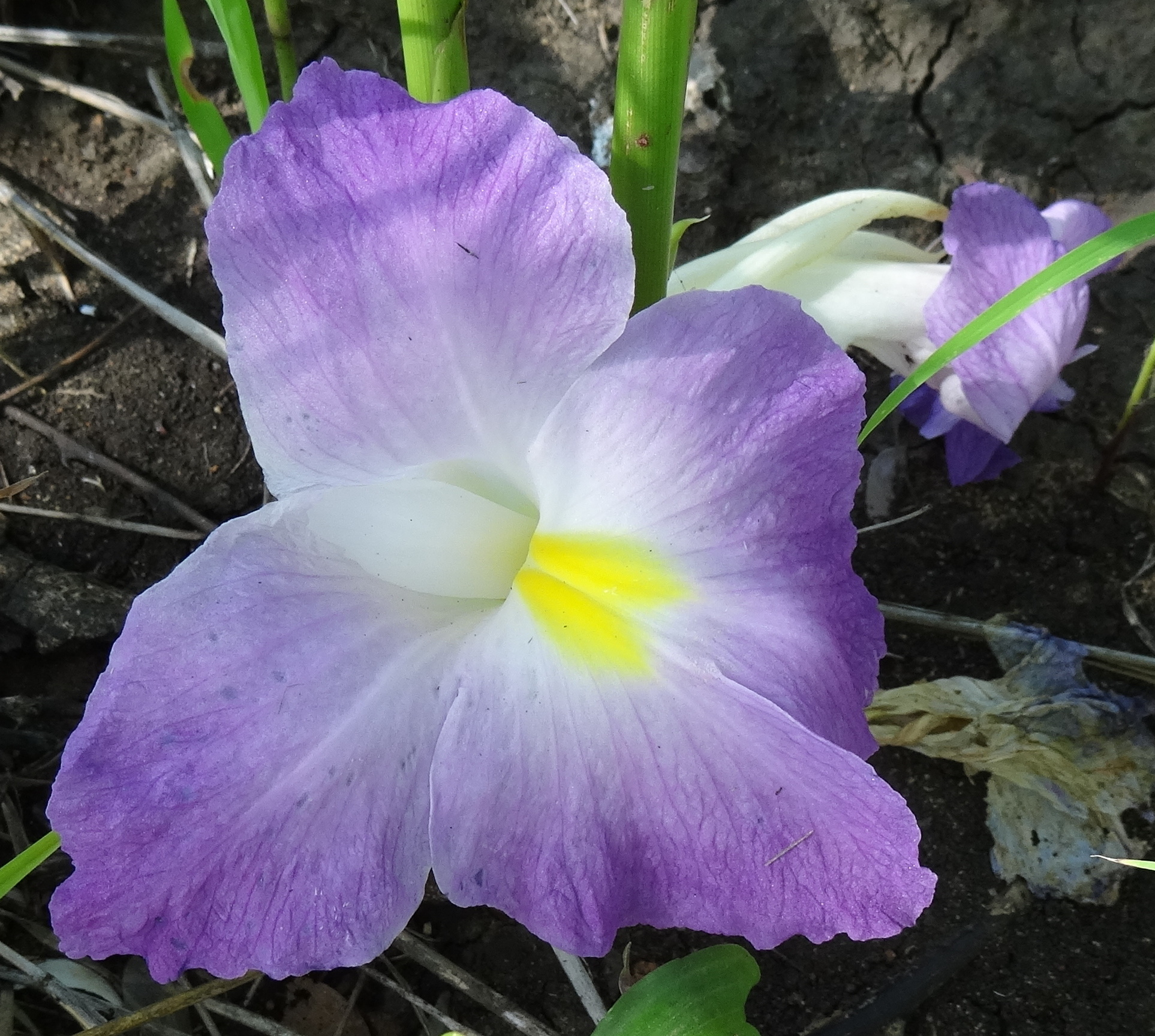
- Siphonochilus aethiopicus flower

Scientific classification
- Kingdom: Plantae
- Clade: Tracheophytes
- Clade: Angiosperms
- Clade: Monocots
- Clade: Commelinids
- Order: Zingiberales
- Family: Zingiberaceae
- Subfamily: Siphonochiloideae
- Tribe: Siphonochileae
- Genus: Siphonochilus; J.M.Wood & Franks

Type species
- Siphonochilus natalensis J. M. Wood & Franks.

Synonyms
- Cienkowskia Schweinf., illegitimate; Cienkowskiella Y.K.Kam

= Siphonochilus =

Genus of flowering plants

Siphonochilus is a genus of flowering plants native to sub-Saharan Africa.

== Species ==
- Siphonochilus aethiopicus (Schweinf.) B.L.Burtt - widespread from Ethiopia west to Sierra Leone and south to South Africa
- Siphonochilus bambutiorum A.D.Poulsen & Lock - Zaïre
- Siphonochilus brachystemon (K.Schum.) B.L.Burtt - eastern Africa from Sudan to Mozambique
- Siphonochilus kilimanensis (Gagnep.) B.L.Burtt - Mozambique
- Siphonochilus kirkii (Hook.f.) B.L.Burtt - eastern and central Africa from Sudan and Central African Republic south to South Africa
- Siphonochilus longitubus Lock - Zambia
- Siphonochilus nigericus (Hutch. ex Hepper) B.L.Burtt - Nigeria, Ghana
- Siphonochilus parvus Lock - Tanzania, Zambia, Malawi
- Siphonochilus pleianthus (K.Schum.) Lock - Zaïre, Angola, Zambia
- Siphonochilus puncticulatus (Gagnep.) Lock - Zaïre, Angola, Zambia
- Siphonochilus rhodesicus (T.C.E.Fr.) Lock - Tanzania, Zambia, Malawi, Zaïre
