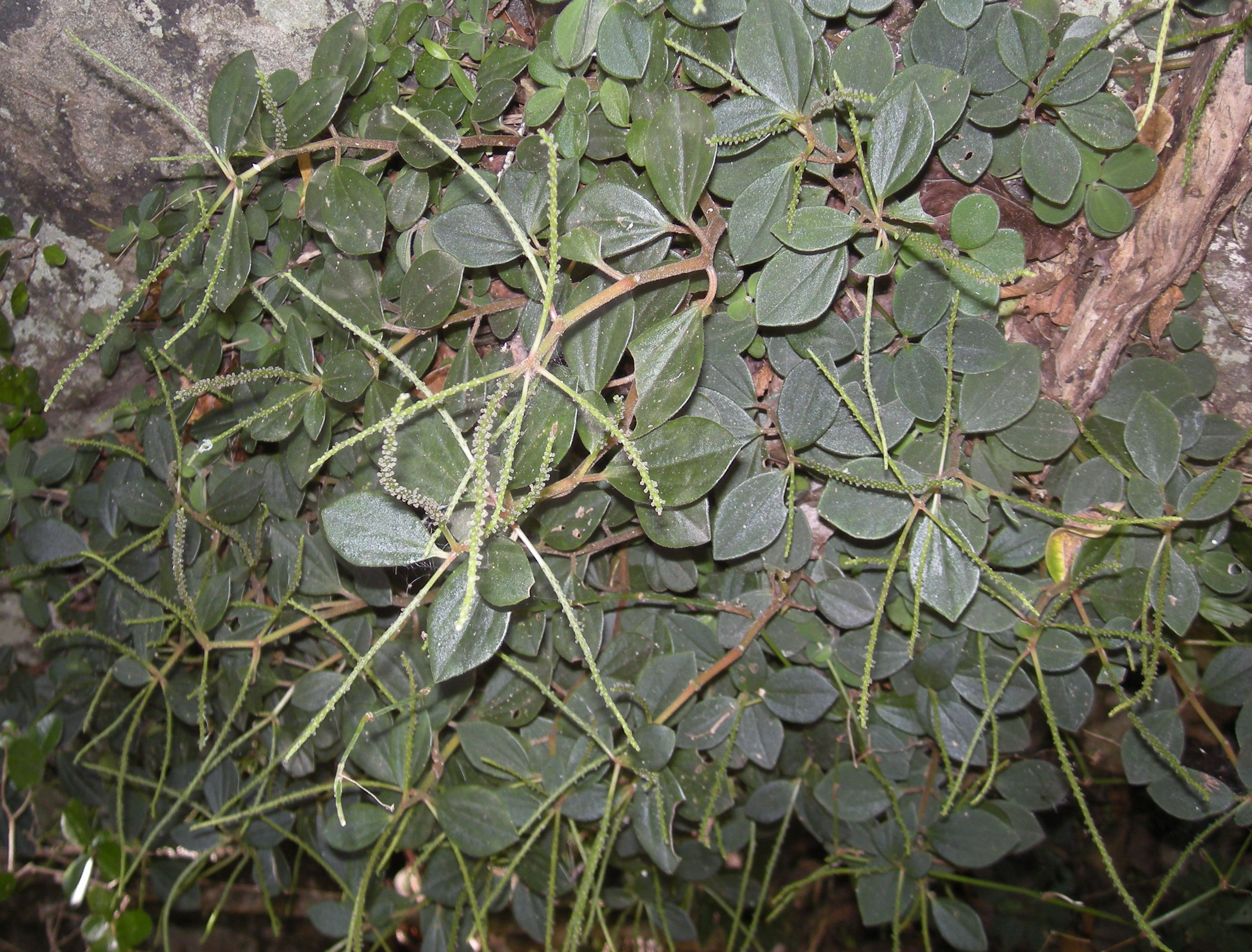

Scientific classification
- Kingdom: Plantae
- Clade: Tracheophytes
- Clade: Angiosperms
- Clade: Magnoliids
- Order: Piperales
- Family: Piperaceae
- Genus: Peperomia
- Species: P. blanda

Binomial name
- Peperomia blanda (Jacq.) Kunth

= Peperomia blanda =

Species of flowering plant

Peperomia blanda, the arid-land peperomia, is a species of herb in the family Piperaceae. The species has a natural pan-tropical distribution that encompasses Asia, Africa, Australasia, Polynesia and the Americas. The species typically grows as a perennial, somewhat succulent herb to 30 cm in height, though the form varies from prostrate and creeping to up to 60 cm tall depending on the environment and genotype. The typical habitat is damp rock crevices and steep stream banks.
