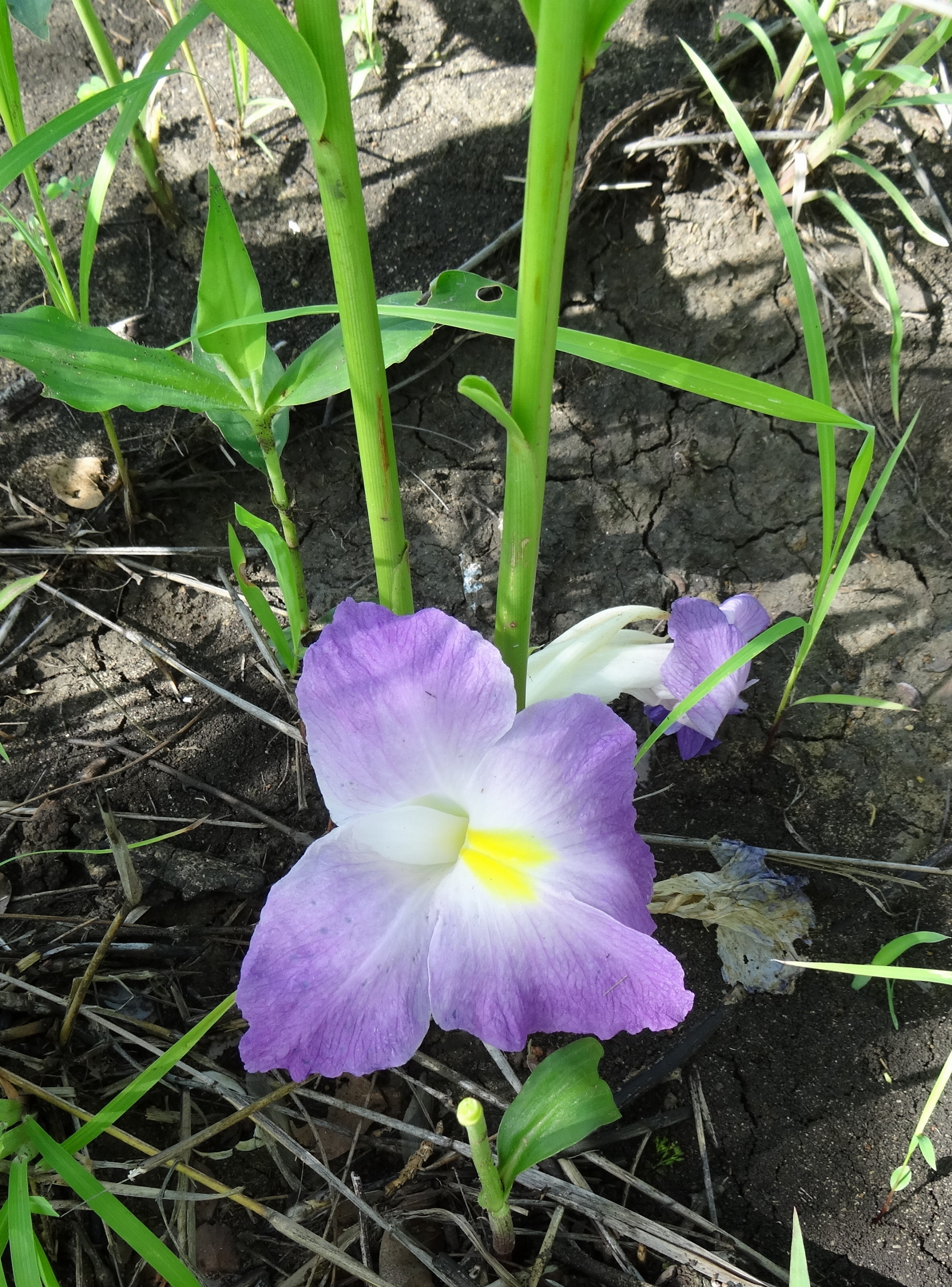
- CITES Appendix II (Note: Only applies to populations from Eswatini, Mozambique, South Africa and Zimbabwe.)

Scientific classification
- Kingdom: Plantae
- Clade: Tracheophytes
- Clade: Angiosperms
- Clade: Monocots
- Clade: Commelinids
- Order: Zingiberales
- Family: Zingiberaceae
- Genus: Siphonochilus
- Species: S. aethiopicus

Binomial name
- Siphonochilus aethiopicus (Schweinf.) B.L.Burtt

= Siphonochilus aethiopicus =

Species of flowering plant

Siphonochilus aethiopicus, commonly known as African ginger, (Note: Local names include mauve ginger, natal ginger, wuan-guriga, sidvungula, lámíníyár kwààɗíí, oburo nla, oburo lela, wildegemmer, indungulo, isiphephetho, tshirungulu, serokolo, and mhlahlampetu.) is a species of flowering plant in the ginger family, Zingiberaceae. It is used in traditional medicine in sub-Saharan Africa, and is critically endangered due to over-harvesting.

== Description ==
Siphonochilus aethiopicus is a flowering deciduous plant in the family Zingiberaceae, the ginger family. It was first described by Georg August Schweinfurth and received its current name from Brian Laurence Burtt. The genus name Siphonochilus comes from siphoni and chilus, both meaning tube, referring to the shape of the flower, while aethiopicus is an archaic word for Africa.

Siphonochilus aethiopicus is native to west and south Africa. Due to over-harvesting, it is currently found at around 10% of its historic range. It can be found in woodland, wooded grassland, and bushland.

It has large light green lance-shaped leaves. The South African variety has white or pink flowers, while the Nigerian variety has purple flowers. The flowers are funnel shaped and grow from ground level. It regrows annually from small underground roots called rhizomes. It can grow to about 60 centimetres (24 in).

It produces small fruit after a short flowering, usually just one day.

== Human uses ==
=== Medicinal ===
Siphonochilus aethiopicus is used in traditional medicine in sub-Saharan Africa, and the African Herbal Pharmacopoeia lists it as one of the 51 most important medicinal plants in the region. The rhizomes are used to treat coughs, influenza, pain, inflammation, and malaria, among others, and sometimes used as a contraceptive tea. The rhizomes and leaves are used to relieve menstrual pain. Extracts are also used in some commercial medicines, including for asthma and allergies.

A 2021 literature review found that the rhizome had "anti-asthmatic, anti-inflammatory, and antiplasmodial" properties, as well as limited antimicrobial effects. The roots and rhizomes contain siphonochilone and eucalyptol, which have been used to treat asthma and allergies, and extracts have "natural anti-inflammatory mediators". There are few studies on the actual efficacy of the plant as used in traditional medicine.

Due to over-harvesting, the plant is considered critically endangered. While the plant can be cultivated, some traditional healers believe that only wild-harvested plants have the correct medical properties. In some markets of the Limpopo Province of South Africa, Siphonochilus aethiopicusi is the most expensive plant per weight, and could cost up to R800 per kilogram in 2011.

=== Other ===
In South Africa, Siphonochilus aethiopicus is used for spiritual healing and protection against spirits. The Zulu people use it to protect against lightning and snake bites. It is sometimes used as a spice or condiment. The oil is used to make perfume.
