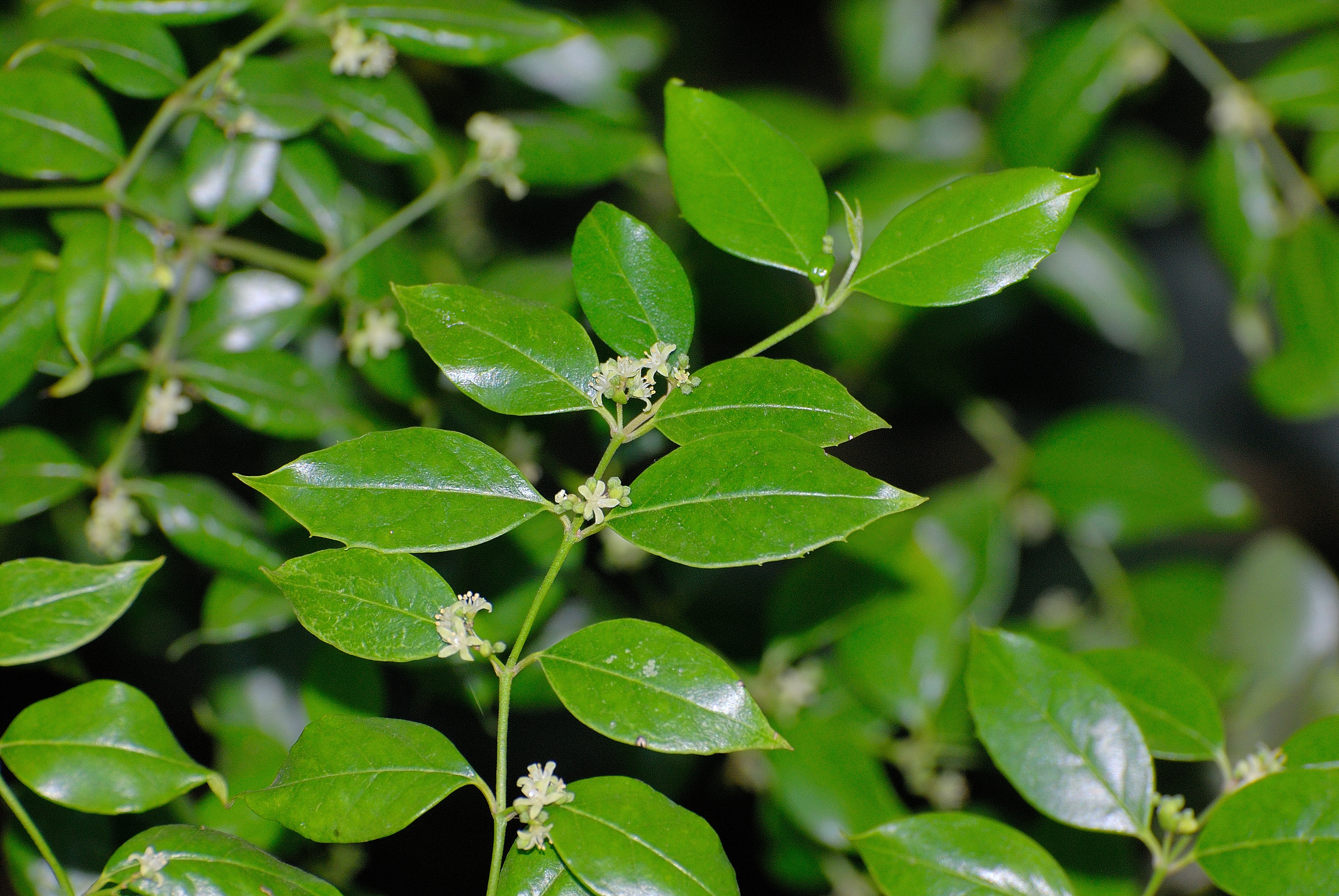
- Flowering C. ilicifolia in South Africa

Scientific classification
- Kingdom: Plantae
- Clade: Tracheophytes
- Clade: Angiosperms
- Clade: Eudicots
- Clade: Asterids
- Order: Icacinales
- Family: Icacinaceae
- Genus: Cassinopsis; Sond.

= Cassinopsis =

Genus of flowering plants

Cassinopsis is a genus of Afrotropical plants, generally placed in the family Icacinaceae. They are lanky, evergreen shrubs or small trees that favour well-watered areas. They may carry spines and the leaves have an opposite arrangement. The genus name suggests its resemblance to the genus Cassine.

== Species ==
The genus contains some six to seven species, including:

- Cassinopsis chapelieri
- Cassinopsis ciliata
- Cassinopsis ilicifolia
- Cassinopsis madagascariensis
- Cassinopsis tinifolia
- Cassinopsis tomentosa
