= Anthophyta =

Division of plants bearing flower-like structures

The anthophytes are a paraphyletic grouping of plant taxa bearing flower-like reproductive structures. The group, once thought to be a clade, contained the angiosperms – the extant flowering plants, such as roses and grasses – as well as the Gnetales and the extinct Bennettitales.

Detailed morphological and molecular studies have shown that the group is not actually monophyletic, with proposed floral homologies of the gnetophytes and the angiosperms having evolved in parallel. This makes it easier to reconcile molecular clock data that suggests that the angiosperms diverged from the gymnosperms around 320-300 mya.

Some more recent studies have used the word anthophyte to describe a hypothetical group which includes the angiosperms and a variety of extinct seed plant groups (with various suggestions including at least some of the following groups: glossopterids, corystosperms, Petriellales, Pentoxylales, Bennettitales and Caytoniales), but not the Gnetales.

Traditional view (clade)

- - Cycads
  - - Ginkgo
    - - Conifers
      - - Anthophytes
          - Angiosperms
          - Bennettitales
          - Gnetales

Modern view

- - Angiosperms
  - - Gymnosperms
      - - Conifers
        - Gnetales
      - - Ginkgo
        - - Bennettitales
          - Cycads

Phylogeny of anthophytes and gymnosperms based on Crepet et al. (2000)
