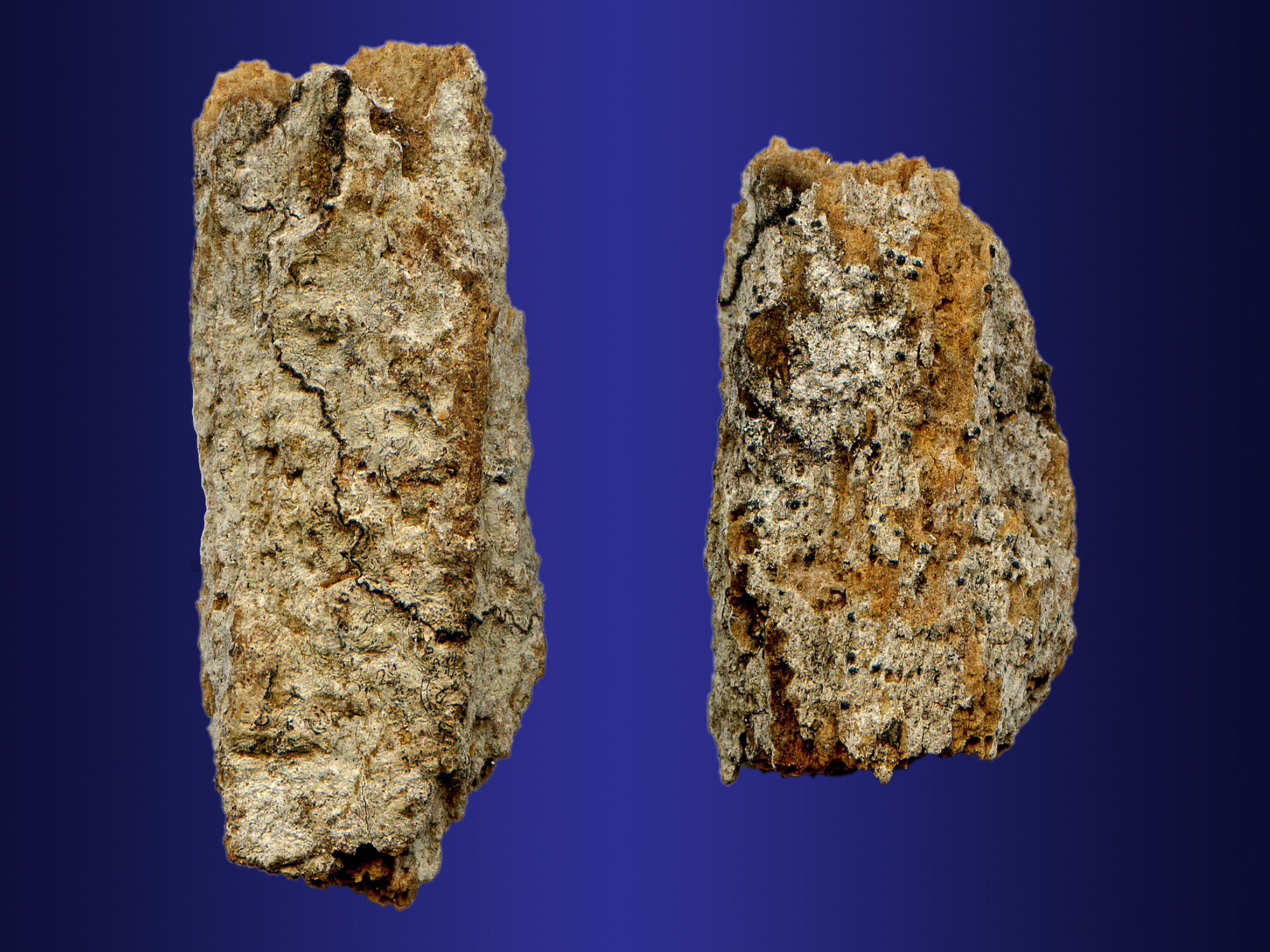
- Okoubaka aubrevillei

Scientific classification
- Kingdom: Plantae
- Clade: Embryophytes
- Clade: Tracheophytes
- Clade: Spermatophytes
- Clade: Angiosperms
- Clade: Eudicots
- Order: Santalales
- Family: Santalaceae
- Genus: Okoubaka; Pellegr. & Normand

Species
- See text

= Okoubaka =

Genus of flowering plant in the mistletoe family

Okoubaka is a genus of tall forest tree native to west and central tropical Africa. It consists of two species, plus a third species or variety. Its name is from the Anyin language meaning a tree with allelopathic properties, or a tree that causes the death of surrounding vegetation. The tree was once common throughout West Africa and parts of Central Africa, with O. aubrevillei being the primary West African species, and O. michelsonii found in Central Africa.

O. aubrevillei was originally named Oktoknema okoubaka and placed in the Octoknemaceae or Olacaceae; however careful morphological studies of the fruits have led to it being classified as Okoubaka and placed in the Santalaceae.

== Species ==
- Okoubaka aubrevillei Pellegr. & Normand (formerly called Octoknema okoubaka Aubrév. & Pellegr.)
  - O. aubrevillei var. glabrescentifolia J. Léonard. – variety found in Democratic Republic of the Congo
- Okoubaka michelsonii J.Léonard & Troupin
