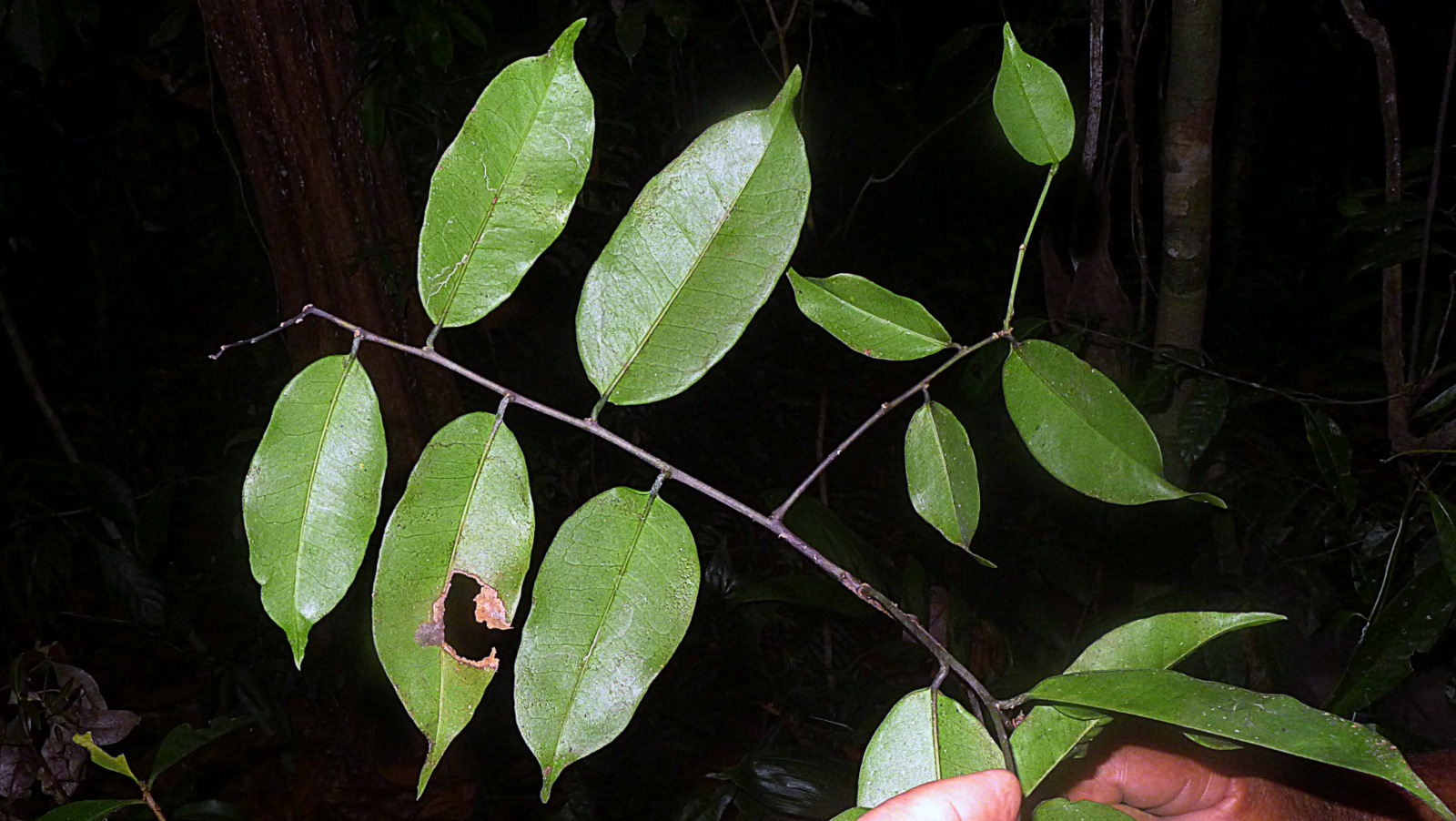
- Aptandra tubicina

Scientific classification
- Kingdom: Plantae
- Clade: Tracheophytes
- Clade: Angiosperms
- Clade: Eudicots
- Order: Santalales
- Family: Aptandraceae; Miers

Genera
- See text

= Aptandraceae =

Family of flowering plants

The Aptandraceae is a family of flowering plants in the sandalwood order Santalales that is recognized by some sources; others sink the family in Olacaceae. The members of the tropical plant family are parasitic on other plants, usually on the roots, and grow as trees, shrubs or woody lianas.

The genera of the family have long been recognized by taxonomists as forming a clade (van Tieghem (1896), Pierre (1897), and Gagnepain (1910)), but have usually been placed in the family Olacaceae. In the APG III and APG IV systems, it was accepted that the Olacaceae sensu lato were paraphyletic but new family limits were not proposed as relationships were considered uncertain. Subsequently, some sources have accepted the division of Olacaceae into six families, including Aptandraceae. Others continue to use a broad circumscription of Olacaceae.

== Genera ==
As of July 2021, eight genera were placed in this family by the Angiosperm Phylogeny Website. As of July 2021, Plants of the World Online placed all the genera in Olacaceae.

- Anacolosa Blume
- Aptandra Miers
- Cathedra Miers
- Chaunochiton Bentham
- Harmandia Baillon
- Hondurodendron C. Ulloa, Nickrent, Whitefoord & Kelly
- Ongokea Pierre
- Phanerodiscus Cavaco
