= H. pallida =

H. pallida may refer to:

- Heisteria pallida, a plant species found in Brazil
- Heliocheilus pallida, a moth species found in Australia
- Hemionitis pallida, a plant species usually called Myriopteris allosuroides found in Mexico
- Heteropsis pallida, a butterfly species found on Madagascar
