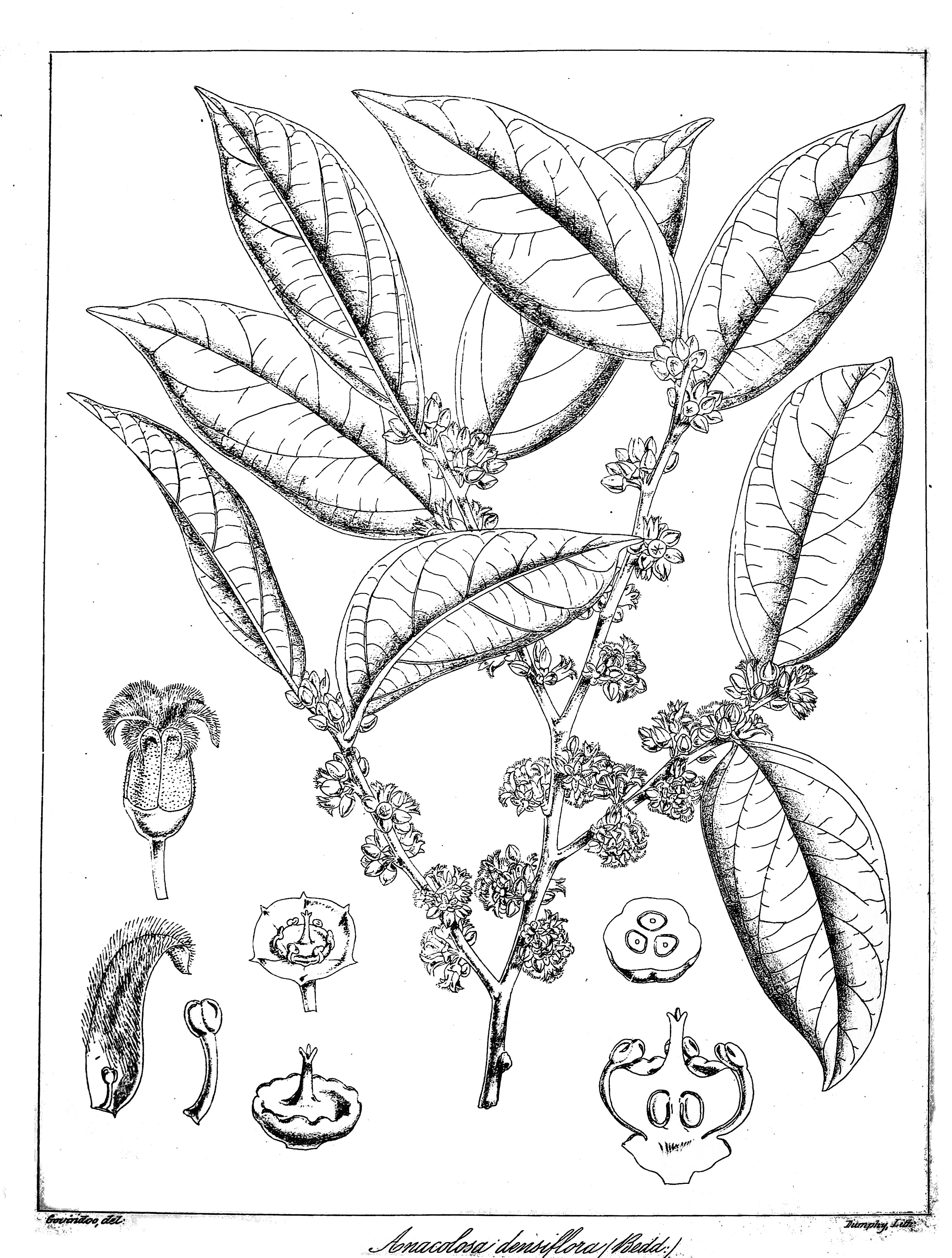

Conservation status
- Endangered (IUCN 2.3)

Scientific classification
- Kingdom: Plantae
- Clade: Tracheophytes
- Clade: Angiosperms
- Clade: Eudicots
- Order: Santalales
- Family: Olacaceae
- Genus: Anacolosa
- Species: A. densiflora

Binomial name
- Anacolosa densiflora Bedd.

= Anacolosa densiflora =

Species of flowering plant

Anacolosa densiflora is a species of plant in the Olacaceae family. Currently, it is an endangered species that is endemic to India.

== Description ==
Anacolosa densiflora is a large tree with long, thin branches. These branches hold a unique fruit that resembles a green plum that turns brown once it falls and dries. This species grows to be around 25 meters tall and has leaves that can be yellow, brown, white, or pink. The leaves are elliptical and are between 6–12 mm long. They pattern in a simple alternate rotation when growing on Anacolosa densiflora.

== Flowering ==
Flowers on Anacolosa densiflora are white, fragrant, and contain 5-6 petals per flower. The plant flowers between the months of September and June. The flowers are bisexual and contain about 5-6 stamen and very small globose anthers. The flower is conical in shape and contain 2-3 ovaries.

== Distribution ==
Anacolosa densiflora is native and endemic to India. Specifically, Anacolosa densiflora is found in the Western Ghats of Kerala and Tamil Nadu. This tree is not found anywhere else, and grows only in the tropical and evergreen forests of the region. The tree is on the endangered species list.

== Habitat ==
Anacolosa densiflora is found in tropical rainforests. This habitat generally lies close to the equator, and is extremely warm and wet. Average rainfall lies between 168 cm to over 1000 cm. Temperatures may also exceed 18 °C (64 °F). Anacolosa densiflora is also able to live and thrive in evergreen forests where the climate is rather temperate and moist. All Anacolosa densiflora habitats face problems with ongoing deforestation.

== Status ==
Due to the endangered status, over harvesting, and destruction of, Anacolosa densiflora habitat needs to be monitored. Ongoing deforestation in this tree's habitat is gradually destroying this unique tree.

== Sources ==
- Walter K.S. and Gillett H.J. (eds) 1998. 1997 IUCN Red List of Threatened Plants. Compiled by the World Conservation Monitoring Centre. IUCN, Gland, Switzerland.
- Nayar M.P. and Sastry A.R.K. (eds) 1990. Red Data Book of Indian Plants Vol. 3. Botanical Survey of India, Calcutta, India.
- Parthasarathy N. 1999. Tree diversity and distribution in undisturbed and human impacted sites of tropical wet evergreen forest in southern Western Ghats, India. Biodiversity and Conservation 8: 1365–1381.
- Flora of Tamil Nadu, VOL. I, 1983; Gamble, 1957, Biodiversity Documentation for Kerala Part 6: Flowering Plants, N. Sasidharan, 2004
- IUCN 1994. IUCN Red List Categories. International Union for the Conservation of Nature and Natural Resources. The World Conservation Union, Cambridge, UK.
- Ganesh T., Ganesan R., Soubadra Devy M., Davidar P. and Bawa K.S. 1996. Assessment of plant biodiversity at mid-elevation evergreen forest of Kalakad-Mundanthurai Tiger Reserve, Western Ghats, India. Current Science 71: 379–392.
