= Minquartynoic acid =

Names
- IUPAC name (17S)-17-hydroxyoctadeca-9,11,13,15-tetraynoic acid

Identifiers
CAS Number	(S-Form) 123154-43-8 (S-Form)
3D model (JSmol)	Interactive image
ChEBI	CHEBI:542606
ChEMBL	ChEMBL487989
ChemSpider	159656
PubChem CID	183614
CompTox Dashboard (EPA)	DTXSID90153872
- InChI: InChI=1S/C18H20O3/c1-17(19)15-13-11-9-7-5-3-2-4-6-8-10-12-14-16-18(20)21/h17,19H,4,6,8,10,12,14,16H2,1H3,(H,20,21)/t17-/m0/s1 Key: MTWGWIOCIREVRF-KRWDZBQOSA-N
- SMILES: CC(C#CC#CC#CC#CCCCCCCCC(=O)O)O

Properties
Chemical formula	C_{18}H_{20}O_{3}
Molar mass	284.355 g·mol^{−1}
Appearance	grey-yellow needles
Melting point	95 °C (203 °F; 368 K)
- Except where otherwise noted, data are given for materials in their standard state (at 25 °C [77 °F], 100 kPa). Infobox references

Minquartynoic acid is an unsaturated, conjugated, and hydroxylated fatty acid containing four triple bonds and belonging to the class of polyyne and alkynoic acids. It was only discovered in 1989. The acid is optically active, but there are conflicting data regarding the rotation of the natural S-isomer.

== Discovery ==
The acid was initially isolated by R.J. Marles, N.R. Farnsworth and D.A. Neill in 1989 from the stem of the Amazonian tree Minquartia guianensis.

== Natural occurrence ==
The acid occurs only in small quantities in the bark or twigs of a few plant species, such as Minquartia guianensis, Ochanostachys amentacea, and Coula edulis, all of the family Olacaceae.

== Synthesis ==
Minquartynoic acid can be synthesized starting from azelaic acid monomethyl ester in a seven-step synthesis. Another synthesis of the compound has also been published.

An infusion of the acid has been used by Ecuadorian indigenous people to treat intestinal parasitic infections, lung cancer, and tuberculosis; also, it has been applied topically to treat skin irritations and muscle pain.

== Uses ==
In in vitro studies, minquartynoic acid was antiviral against HIV and cytotoxic against ten different cancer cell lines, including leukemia cells. In other studies, it has shown activity against malaria and Leishmania.
