= Heisteria cyathiformis =

Conservation status
- Endangered (IUCN 3.1)

Scientific classification
- Kingdom: Plantae
- Clade: Tracheophytes
- Clade: Angiosperms
- Clade: Eudicots
- Order: Santalales
- Family: Olacaceae
- Genus: Heisteria
- Species: H. cyathiformis

Binomial name
- Heisteria cyathiformis Little

Species of flowering plant

Heisteria cyathiformis is a species of plant in the family Olacaceae. It is endemic to Ecuador.
