= Anacolosa frutescens =

Conservation status
- Least Concern (IUCN 3.1)

Scientific classification
- Kingdom: Plantae
- Clade: Tracheophytes
- Clade: Angiosperms
- Clade: Eudicots
- Order: Santalales
- Family: Olacaceae
- Genus: Anacolosa
- Species: A. frutescens

Binomial name
- Anacolosa frutescens (Blume) Blume

Synonyms
- Anacolosa arborea Koord. & Valeton; Anacolosa celebica Valeton ex Koord.; Anacolosa heptandra Maingay ex Mast.; Anacolosa luzoniensis Merr.; Anacolosa puberula Kurz; Anacolosa puberula var. andamanica Kurz; Anacolosa zollingeri Baill.; Stemonurus frutescens Blume

Species of flowering plant

Anacolosa frutescens, also known as galo or galonut, is a plant in the family Olacaceae. The specific epithet frutescens is from the Latin frutex meaning 'shrub'. It produces edible fruits and nuts eaten in the Philippines.

== Description ==
Anacolosa frutescens grows as a shrub or small tree up to 30 metres (100 ft) tall with a diameter of up to 30 centimetres (12 in). The greenish grey bark is smooth to mottled. The obovoid to oblong fruits are green, ripening to yellow or orange, and measure up to 1.2 cm (0.5 in) long. The wood is sometimes locally used for house posts.

== Distribution and habitat ==
Anacolosa frutescens is native to Southeast Asia, from the Andaman and Nicobar Islands and Myanmar through Malaysia, Indonesia, and the Philippines. Its habitat is mixed dipterocarp forests, sometimes heath and peat swamp forests, occasionally submontane forests, from sea-level to 1,100 metres (3,600 ft) altitude.

== Uses ==
The fruit and seeds of galo (also known as aluloy) is eaten in the Philippines. The fruit is usually boiled before consumption and has a taste similar to avocado. The seeds have a flavor described as being similar to a mixture of sweet corn and chestnuts.
