= Brachynema axillare =

Scientific classification
- Kingdom: Plantae
- Clade: Tracheophytes
- Clade: Angiosperms
- Clade: Eudicots
- Order: Santalales
- Family: Olacaceae
- Genus: Brachynema
- Species: B. axillare

Binomial name
- Brachynema axillare Duno & P.E.Berry

Species of plant

Brachynema axillare is a dicotyledonous plant species described by R. Duno de Stefano and Paul Edward Berry. Brachynema axillaries is part of the genus Brachynema and the family Olacaceae. No subspecies are listed in the Catalog of Life.
