= Harmandia =

Harmandia may refer to:

- Harmandia (fly), a genus of flies in the family Cecidomyiidae
- Harmandia (bivalve), a genus in family Unionidae
- Harmandia, a genus of plants in the family Olacaceae with one species Harmandia mekongensis
