= Heisteria maguirei =

Conservation status
- Least Concern (IUCN 2.3)

Scientific classification
- Kingdom: Plantae
- Clade: Tracheophytes
- Clade: Angiosperms
- Clade: Eudicots
- Order: Santalales
- Family: Olacaceae
- Genus: Heisteria
- Species: H. maguirei

Binomial name
- Heisteria maguirei Sleumer

Species of flowering plant

Heisteria maguirei is a species of plant in the family Olacaceae. It is found in Brazil, Guyana, and Venezuela.
