= Octoknema orientalis =

Conservation status
- Near Threatened (IUCN 3.1)

Scientific classification
- Kingdom: Plantae
- Clade: Embryophytes
- Clade: Tracheophytes
- Clade: Angiosperms
- Clade: Eudicots
- Order: Santalales
- Family: Olacaceae
- Genus: Octoknema
- Species: O. orientalis

Binomial name
- Octoknema orientalis Mildbr.

Species of flowering plant

Octoknema orientalis is a species of flowering plant in the family Olacaceae. It is endemic to Tanzania.
