= Brachynema (plant) =

Scientific classification
- Kingdom: Plantae
- Clade: Tracheophytes
- Clade: Angiosperms
- Clade: Eudicots
- Order: Santalales
- Family: Olacaceae
- Genus: Brachynema; Benth.

Species
- See text

Genus of flowering plants

Brachynema Benth. is a genus in the plant family Olacaceae. It is a Neotropical genus of 1 or 2 species of trees. Its placement is still somewhat controversial as molecular data is lacking and morphological data suggests a place outside Olacaceae and instead in Ericales

== Species ==
- Brachynema ramiflorum Benth., Trans. Linn. Soc. London 22(2): 126. 1857 [21 Nov 1857]
- Brachynema axillare R.Duno & P.E.Berry, Novon 5(3): 238. 1995 [Autumn 1995]
