= Strombosiopsis =

Scientific classification
- Kingdom: Plantae
- Clade: Tracheophytes
- Clade: Angiosperms
- Clade: Eudicots
- Order: Santalales
- Family: Olacaceae
- Genus: Strombosiopsis; Engl.

Genus of plants

Strombosiopsis is a genus of flowering plants belonging to the family Olacaceae.

Its native range is Western Tropical Africa to Uganda.

Species:

- Strombosiopsis nana Breteler
- Strombosiopsis sereinii Breteler
- Strombosiopsis tetrandra Engl.
