= Cathedra (plant) =

Scientific classification
- Kingdom: Plantae
- Clade: Tracheophytes
- Clade: Angiosperms
- Clade: Eudicots
- Order: Santalales
- Family: Olacaceae
- Genus: Cathedra

Synonyms
- Heterotypic synonyms: Diplocrater Benth.

Genus of flowering plants

Cathedra is a genus of flowering plants. In the APG IV system, the genus is placed in the family Olacaceae. Other sources place it in the family Aptandraceae. It is native to Bolivia, Brazil, Colombia, Ecuador, French Guiana, Guyana, Peru, and Venezuela.

== Species ==
Accepted species include:

- Cathedra acuminata (Benth.) Miers
- Cathedra bahiensis Sleumer
- Cathedra grandiflora Loes.
- Cathedra rubricaulis Miers
- Cathedra rupestris D.S.Lucena & M.Alves
