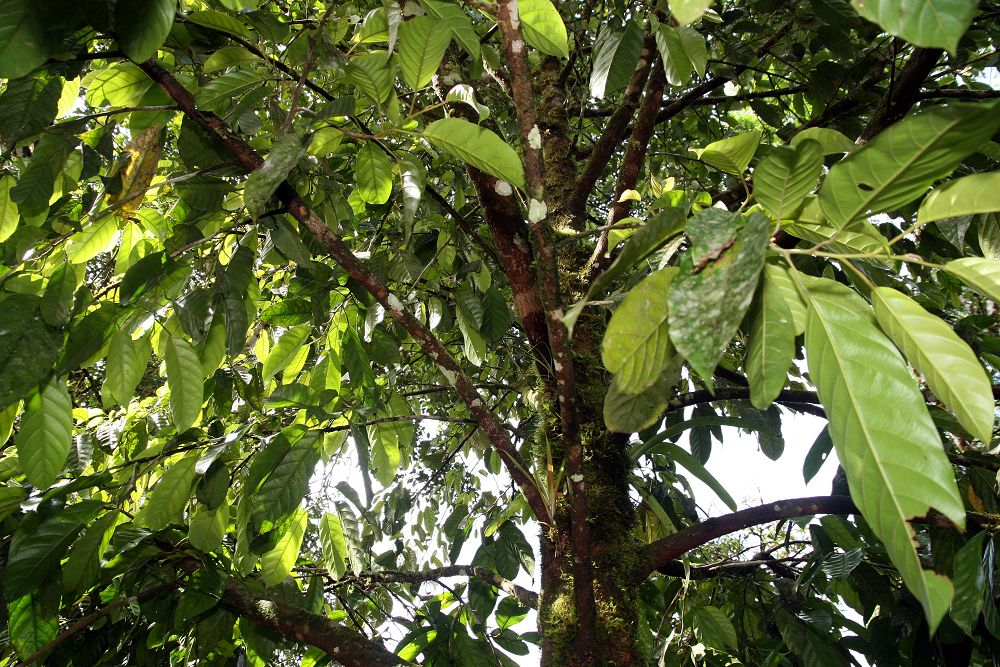

Conservation status
- Near Threatened (IUCN 2.3)

Scientific classification
- Kingdom: Plantae
- Clade: Tracheophytes
- Clade: Angiosperms
- Clade: Eudicots
- Order: Santalales
- Family: Olacaceae
- Genus: Minquartia; Aubl.
- Species: M. guianensis

Binomial name
- Minquartia guianensis Aubl.

= Minquartia =

Genus of trees

Minquartia is a monotypic genus of flowering plants in the Olacaceae family containing the single species Minquartia guianensis (also called black manwood or huambula). It is found in Bolivia, Brazil, Colombia, Costa Rica, Ecuador, French Guiana, Guyana, Nicaragua, Panama, Peru, Suriname, and Venezuela.

One of the phytochemicals it contains is lichexanthone.

The plant is a source of minquartynoic acid, a rare fatty acid.
