= Octoknemaceae =

Scientific classification
- Kingdom: Plantae
- Clade: Tracheophytes
- Clade: Angiosperms
- Clade: Eudicots
- Order: Santalales
- Family: Octoknemaceae; Soler.

Genera
- Octoknema

Family of flowering plants

Octoknemaceae is a monotypic family of flowering plants endemic to continental Africa. The APG III system of 2009 and the APG II system of 2003 (unchanged from the APG system of 1998), do not recognize this family. The family is recognized by the Angiosperm Phylogeny Website, based on work since the publication of the APG III system.
