= Diogo Cão =

Portuguese explorer (1452–1486)

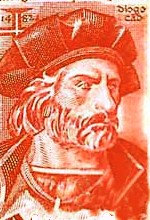
- Diogo Cão on a former Portuguese escudo bill
- Pronunciation: IPA: [diˈoɣu ˈkɐ̃w]
- Born: c. 1452; Vila Real, Kingdom of Portugal
- Died: 1486 (aged around 33–34); Cape Cross (present-day Namibia)
- Occupations: Navigator and explorer
- Known for: First European to explore the Congo River and the west coast of Africa

Diogo Cão (European Portuguese pronunciation: [diˈoɣu ˈkɐ̃w]; c. 1452 – 1486), also known as Diogo Cam, was a Portuguese mariner and one of the most notable explorers of the fifteenth century. He made two voyages along the west coast of Africa in the 1480s, exploring the Congo River and the coasts of present-day Angola and Namibia.

== Early life and family ==
Little is known about the early life of Diogo Cão. According to tradition, he was born in Vila Real, Portugal, around 1452. His grandfather, Gonçalo Cão, had fought for Portuguese independence at the Battle of Aljubarrota.

By 1480, Cão was sailing off the coast of Africa in the service of João II. There is a record that he returned to Portugal with captured Spanish ships.

== Exploration ==
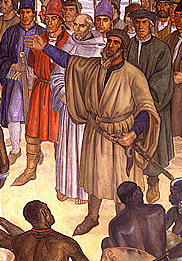
Diogo Cão, at the mouth of Zaire, after having put the padrão

When the Treaty of Alcáçovas (1480) confirmed Portugal's monopoly on trade and exploration along Africa's west coast, João II moved quickly to secure and expand his hold on the region. In 1481, a fleet of ten ships was dispatched to the Gold Coast to construct a fortress known as São Jorge da Mina. The fort would serve as a commercial center for trade (including in slaves) and an important point of resupply for Portuguese voyages. João II also re-instituted a program of exploration southward along the African coast, an initiative that had been held in abeyance during the war with Spain. Diogo Cão was selected to lead João's first voyage of exploration in 1482.

=== First voyage ===
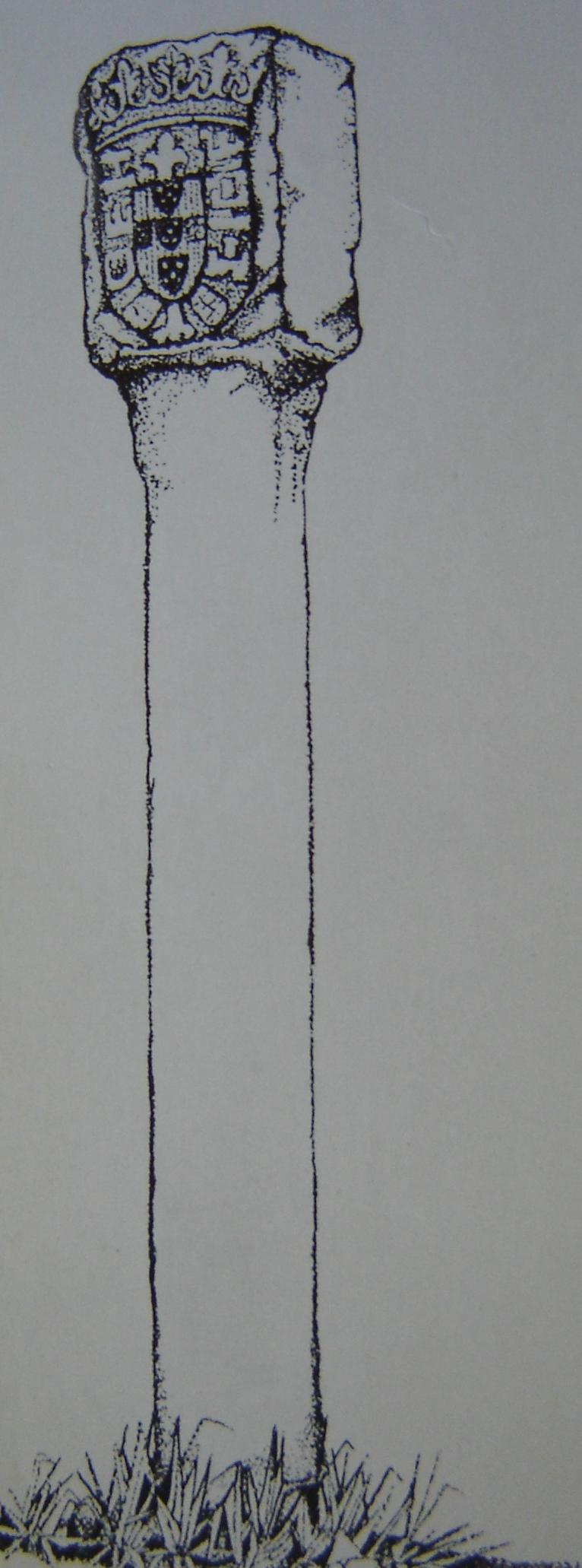
The padrão bearing the arms of Portugal erected by Cão at Cape St. Mary

When João II restarted the work of Henry the Navigator, he sent out Cão, probably around midsummer 1482, to explore the African coast south of the equator. Diogo Cão filled his ship with stone pillars (padrões) surmounted by the cross of the Order of Christ and engraved with the Portuguese royal arms, planning to erect them at significant landmarks along his voyage of discovery. On the way, the expedition stopped at Sao Jorge da Mina to resupply.

In August 1482, Cão arrived at the Congo River mouth and marked it with a padrão erected on Shark Point, commemorating the Portuguese occupation. This padrão stood until 1642 when it was destroyed by the Dutch during their occupation of the Congo.

Cão sailed up the great river for a short distance and commenced modest commerce with the natives of the Bakongo kingdom. He was told that their king lived farther upriver, so he sent four Christian native messengers to search for the ruler and then proceeded south along the coast of present-day Angola where he erected a second padrão, probably marking the termination of this voyage, at Cabo de Santa Maria. When he returned to the Congo, Cão was annoyed to find that his messengers had not returned, so he abducted four local natives who were visiting his ship and returned with them to Portugal.

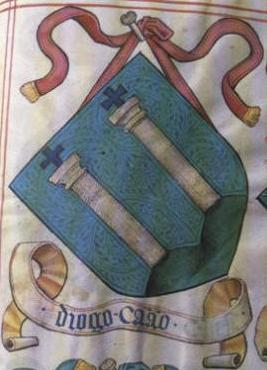
Diogo Cão's coat of arms

He reached Lisbon by 8 April 1484, where John II ennobled him, promoting him from esquire to a cavalier of his household, and granted him an annuity of eighteen thousand reals and a coat of arms on which two padrões are depicted.

The King also asked him to sail back to Kongo to repatriate the 4 men he left behind.

=== Second voyage ===
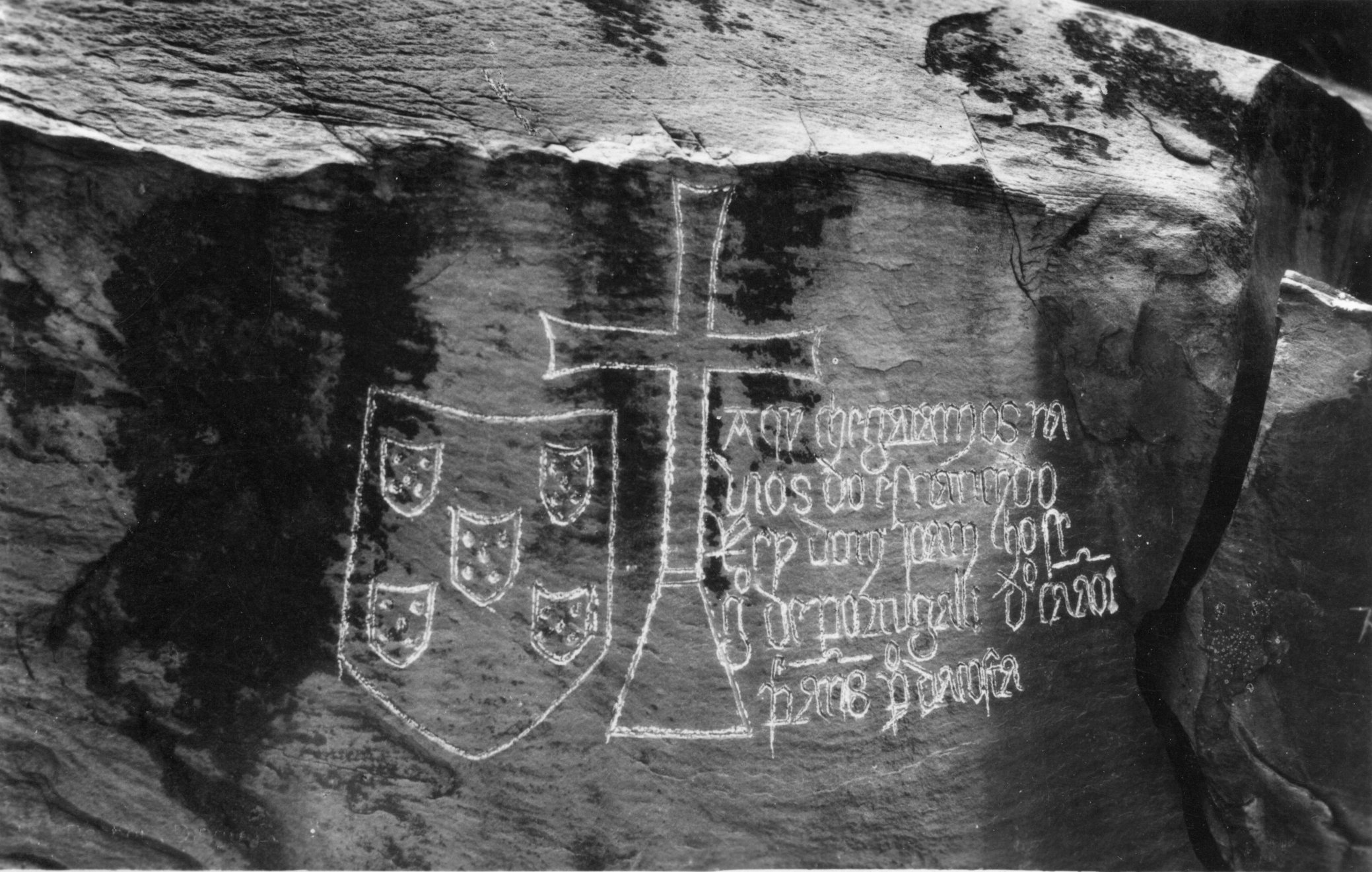
Stone of Yellala, with the inscriptions of Diogo Cão

That Cão, on his second voyage of 1484–1486, was accompanied by Martin Behaim (as alleged on the latter's Nuremberg globe of 1492) is very doubtful. But it is known that the explorer revisited the Congo and erected two more padrões on land beyond his previous voyage. The first was at Cabo Negro, Angola, the second at Cape Cross. The Cape Cross pillar probably marked the end of his progress southward, some 1,400 kilometers. Diogo Cão also embarked the four indigenous ambassadors, that he had promised not to keep for more than fifteen moons.

Cão sailed 170 kilometers up the Congo River to the Yellala Falls. On the cliffs above this site an inscription was engraved which records the passage of Cão and his men: "Here arrived the ships of the illustrious monarch, Dom João the Second of Portugal – Diogo Cão, Pedro Anes, Pedro da Costa, Alvaro Pires, Pero Escolar".

=== Death ===
Information regarding Cão's death is scanty and contradictory. A legend on the globe created by Martin Behaim reads "hic moritur" (here he dies), seeming to indicate that the explorer lost his life on the coast of Africa in 1486 during his second voyage. However, sixteenth-century historian João de Barros never mentions Cão's death but wrote instead of his return to the Congo, and subsequent taking of a native envoy back to Portugal.

A report by a board of astronomers and pilots presented at a 1525 conference in Badajo clearly stated that his death happened near Serra Parda. A coast map by Henricus Martellus Germanus published in 1489 indicated the location of a padrão erected by Diogo Cão in Ponta dos Farilhões nearby Serra Parda, with the legend "et hic moritur" ("and here he died").

== Padrões ==
The four pillars set up by Cão on his two voyages have all been discovered still on their original site, and the inscriptions on two of them from Cape Santa Maria and Cape Cross, dated 1482 and 1485 respectively, are still to be read and have been printed. The Cape Cross padrão was long in Berlin (replaced on the spot by a granite facsimile) but was recently returned to Namibia; those from the Kongo estuary and the more southerly Cape Santa Maria and Cabo Negro are in the Museum of the Lisbon Geographical Society.

== Tributes post-mortem ==
In 1951, botanists named a genus of plants from western central tropical Africa in his honour, Diogoa.

In Vila Real, the plaza Diogo Cão was named after him. In the center of the plaza, stands a bronze statue of him supported on a square granite pedestal base.

In 1999, André Roubertou from the French Hydrographic Office (SHOM) named an undersea hole located off the southern coast of Portugal (Gulf of Cádiz) the Diogo Cão Hole.

In 2018, a hopper dredger called the Diogo Cao and immatriculated in Luxembourg was launched afloat.

== In literature ==
Diogo Cão is the subject of Padrão, one of the best-known poems in Fernando Pessoa's book Mensagem, the only one published during the author's lifetime. He also figures strongly in the 1996 novel Lord of the Kongo by Peter Forbath.

== See also ==
- Portugal in the period of discoveries

== Sources ==
English

- Bell, Christopher (1974). Portugal and the Quest for the Indies. New York: Barnes and Noble. ISBN 9780064903523. OCLC 253910011.
- Buisseret, David, ed. (2007). "Cao, Diogo". The Oxford Companion to World Exploration. Oxford University Press. ISBN 9780195307412.
- Diffie, Bailey W. (1977). Foundations of the Portuguese empire, 1415–1580. George D. Winius. Minneapolis: University of Minnesota Press. pp. 154–162. ISBN 978-0-8166-8156-3.
- Dutra, Francis A. (2007). "Cao, Diogo". In Buisseret, David (ed.). The Oxford Companion to World Exploration (online ed.). Oxford University Press. ISBN 9780195307412.
- Howgego, Raymond John, ed. (2003). "Cao, Diogo". Encyclopedia of Exploration to 1800. Hordern House. ISBN 1875567364.
- Ravenstein, E. G. (1900). "The Voyages of Diogo Cão and Bartholomeu Dias, 1482–88". The Geographical Journal. 16 (6): 625–655. doi:10.2307/1775267. hdl:2027/mdp.39015050934820. ISSN 0016-7398. JSTOR 1775267.
- Winius, George D., ed. (1995). Portugal, the Pathfinder: Journeys from the Medieval Toward the Modern World; 1300 – ca. 1600. Portuguese series. Madison: Hispanic Seminary of Medieval Studies. pp. 94–99. ISBN 978-1-56954-008-4.
- Winius, George D. (2003). "Cão, Diogo". In Gerli, E. Michael (ed.). Medieval Iberia : an encyclopedia. New York: Routledge. ISBN 0-415-93918-6. OCLC 50404104.

Portuguese

- Barros, João de. Décadas da Ásia, Década I. bk. III., esp. ch. 3;
- Ruy de Pina, Chronica d'el Rei D. João II.;
- Garcia de Resende, Chronica;
- Luciano Cordeiro, Diogo Cão in Boletim da Sociedade de Geografia de Lisboa, 1892;
