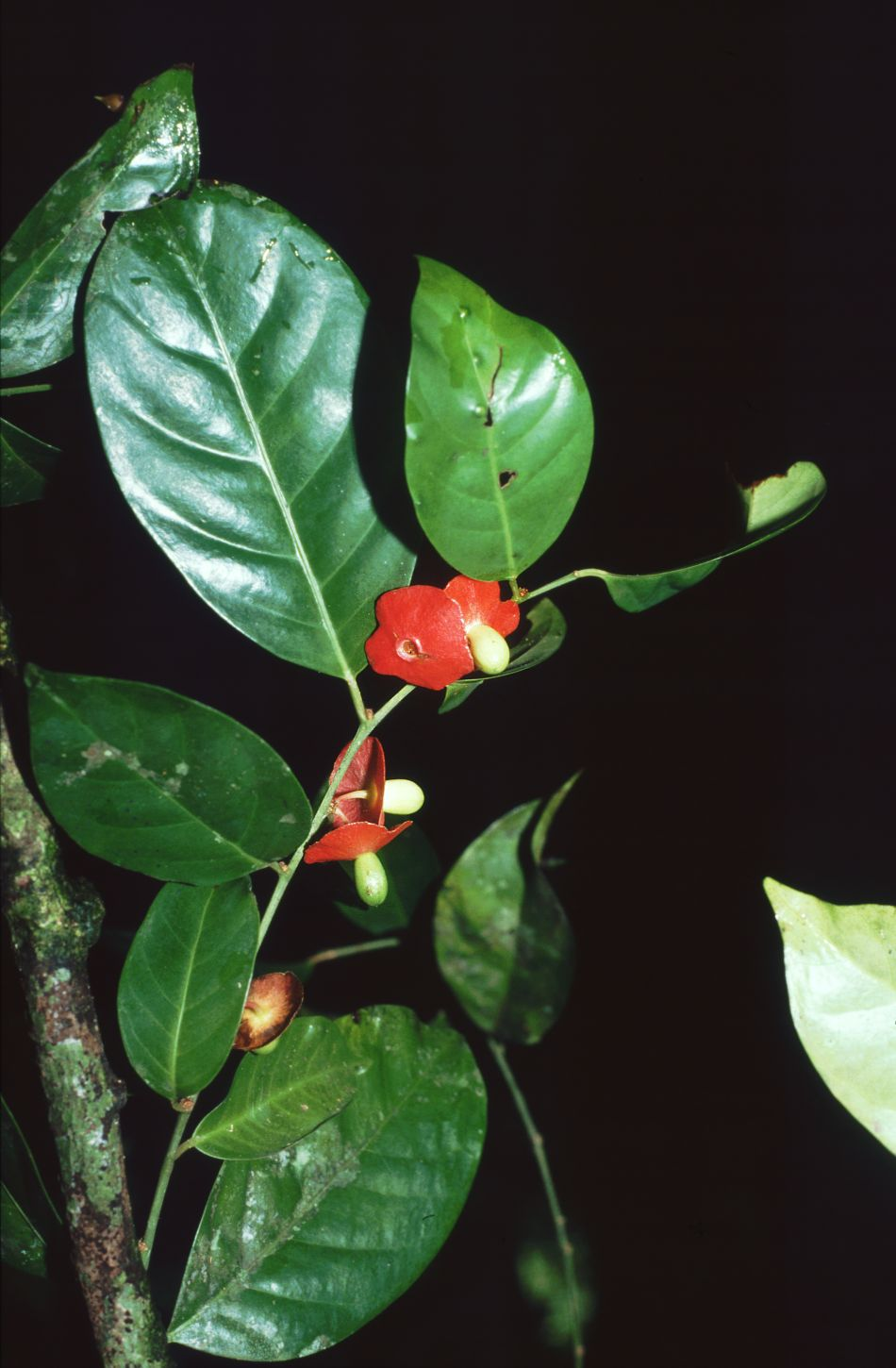
- Heisteria acuminata

Scientific classification
- Kingdom: Plantae
- Clade: Tracheophytes
- Clade: Angiosperms
- Clade: Eudicots
- Order: Santalales
- Family: Olacaceae
- Genus: Heisteria; Jacq.

= Heisteria =

Genus of flowering plants

Heisteria is a genus of plants in the family Olacaceae, although it is sometimes listed under the largely unrecognized family erythropalaceae. It contains the following species (this list may be incomplete):

- Heisteria acuminata
- Heisteria asplundii Sleumer
- Heisteria concinna Standl.
- Heisteria costaricensis Donn. Sm.
- Heisteria cyathiformis Little
- Heisteria fatoensis Standl.
- Heisteria longipes Standl.
- Heisteria maguirei Sleumer
- Heisteria pallida Engl.
- Heisteria parvifolia Sm.
