= Hondurodendron =

Scientific classification
- Kingdom: Plantae
- Clade: Tracheophytes
- Clade: Angiosperms
- Clade: Eudicots
- Order: Santalales
- Family: Olacaceae
- Genus: Hondurodendron; C.Ulloa et al.
- Species: H. urceolatum

Binomial name
- Hondurodendron urceolatum C.Ulloa, Nickrent, Whitef. & D.L.Kelly

Genus of flowering plants

Hondurodendron is a monotypic genus of tree endemic to Honduras. The only species in the genus, H. urceolatum, was discovered during 2004 and 2006 botanical surveys of plants in Parque Nacional El Cusuco in northwest Honduras. It was subsequently described in 2010 by Carmen Ulloa Ulloa, Daniel L. Nickrent, Caroline Whitefoord, and Daniel L. Kelly in the Annals of the Missouri Botanical Garden.

The genus is placed in the family Olacaceae, when the family is circumscribed as in the APG IV system. Other sources place it in the segregate family Aptandraceae.

Photographs of this species can be seen on the Parasitic Plant Connection Aptandraceae web page (link below).
