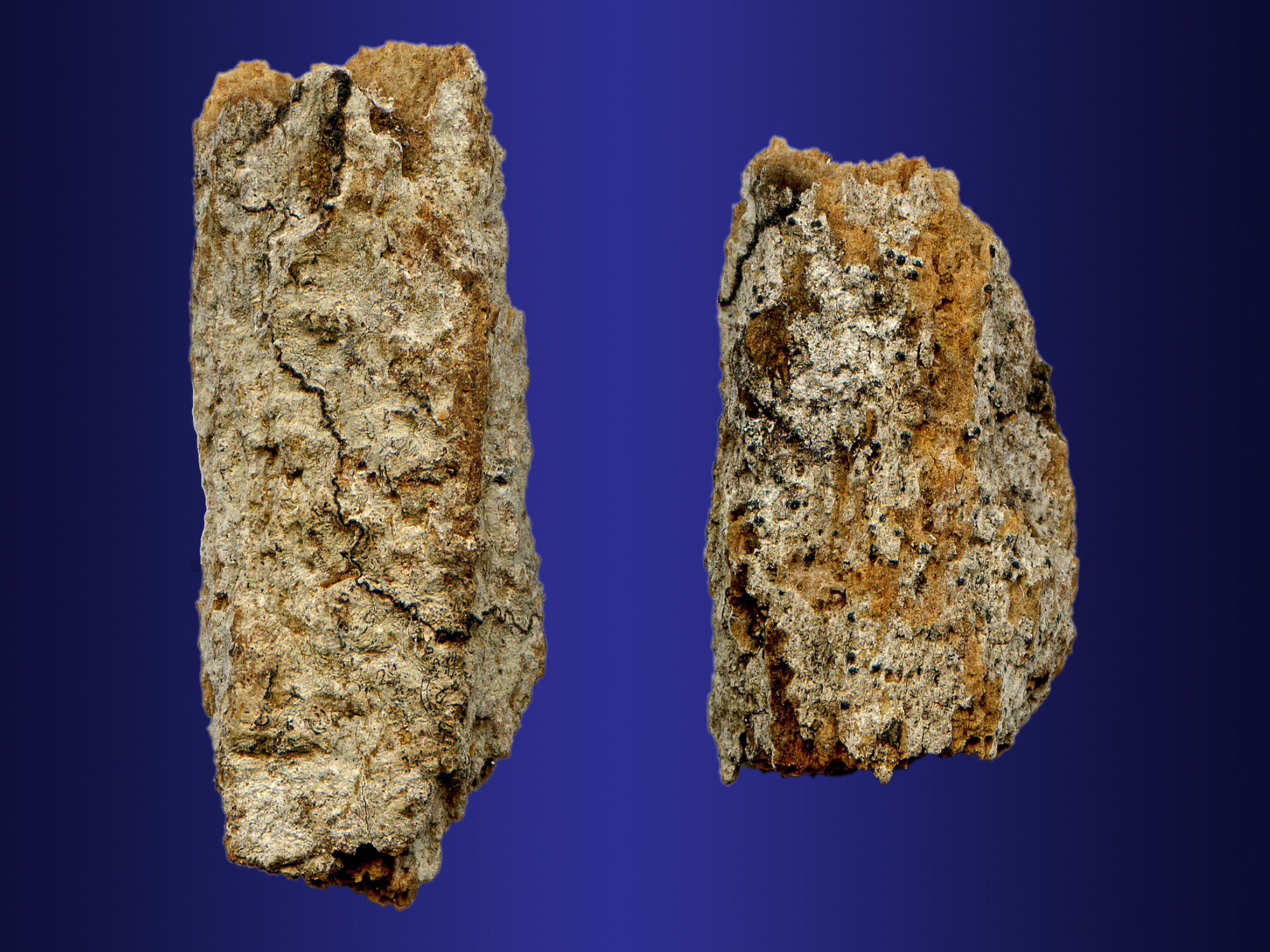

Conservation status
- Endangered (IUCN 3.1)

Scientific classification
- Kingdom: Plantae
- Clade: Embryophytes
- Clade: Tracheophytes
- Clade: Spermatophytes
- Clade: Angiosperms
- Clade: Eudicots
- Order: Santalales
- Family: Santalaceae
- Genus: Okoubaka
- Species: O. aubrevillei

Binomial name
- Okoubaka aubrevillei Pellegr. & Normand

= Okoubaka aubrevillei =

Species of tree

Okoubaka aubrevillei (known as okoubaka tree from "oku baku" in Anyin) is a rare tropical tree species distributed throughout tropical rainforests of West and Central Africa that is thought to be the largest known parasitic plant.

== Names ==
The name "okoubaku" derives from the Anyin (a language mostly spoken by peoples in Côte d'Ivoire) term oku baku meaning "a tree that causes the death of surrounding vegetation", or "a tree with allelopathic properties", or simply "death tree".

== Description ==
The okoubaka tree is considered a trophophyte, meaning it is adapted to an environment that alternates between periods of heavy rainfall and droughts. It is deciduous meaning it sheds its leaves seasonally, and monoecious, meaning it contains both male and female reproductive flower parts.

It is a tree that can reach 40 meters in height with a trunk that can reach 3 meters in width. The tree forms a large bushy crown and has a straight and cylindrical bole (trunk). Its bark is coarse and usually reddish-brown. The tree development fits the Mangenot architectural model.

== Ecology ==
The okoubaka tree is a hemiparasite meaning it is parasitic under natural conditions but is photosynthetic to some degree. It is known to parasitize tiama (Entandrophragma angolense from the mahogany family), African teak (Pericopsis elata from the legume family), Pterygota macrocarpa (from the mallow family), and baku (Tieghemella heckelii from Sapotaceae) with P. macrocarpa and African teak being reported as most affected.

Seed mass is large and so seed dispersal has been hypothesized to depend on large forest animals such as elephants.

== Folk medicine ==
The tree is thought to be useful for various folk medicinal purposes in all of its native ranges (mostly the seeds and bark). In Nigeria, the stem bark is used for the production of Maloff-HB, an anti-malarial drug. There is no scientific evidence that it has any medicinal properties.
