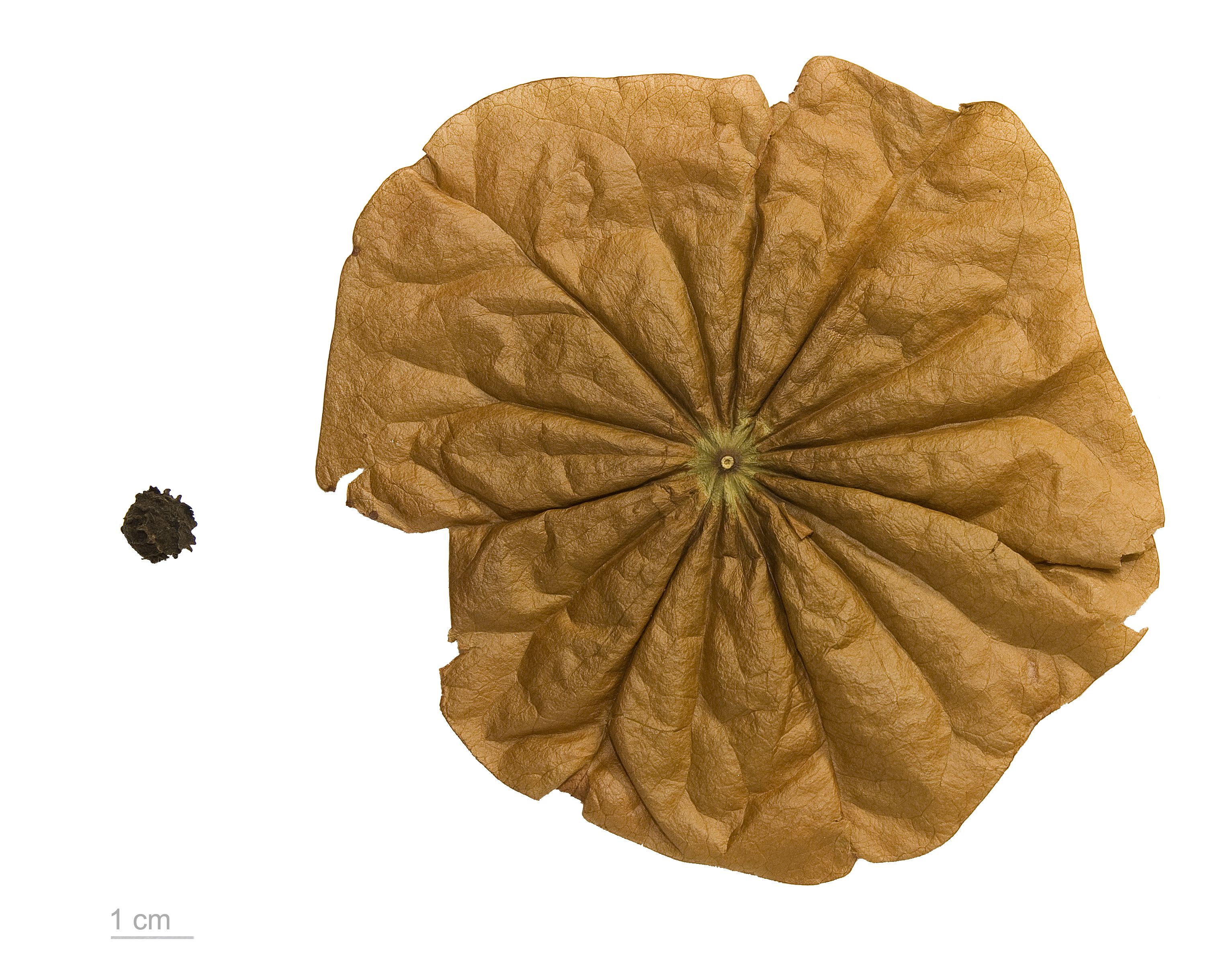

Scientific classification
- Kingdom: Plantae
- Clade: Tracheophytes
- Clade: Angiosperms
- Clade: Eudicots
- Order: Santalales
- Family: Olacaceae
- Genus: Chaunochiton; Benth.

= Chaunochiton =

Genus of flowering plants

Chaunochiton is a genus of flowering plants. In the APG IV system, the genus is placed in the family Olacaceae. Other sources place it in the segregate family Aptandraceae.

Its native range is Central and Southern Tropical America.

Species:

- Chaunochiton angustifolium Sleumer
- Chaunochiton kappleri (Sagot ex Engl.) Ducke
- Chaunochiton loranthoides Benth.
