= Diogoa =

Scientific classification
- Kingdom: Plantae
- Clade: Embryophytes
- Clade: Tracheophytes
- Clade: Spermatophytes
- Clade: Angiosperms
- Clade: Eudicots
- Order: Santalales
- Family: Olacaceae
- Genus: Diogoa; Exell & Mendonça

Genus of plants

Diogoa is a genus of flowering plants belonging to the family Olacaceae.

Its native range is Western Central Tropical Africa; found in Cameroon, Congo, Gabon, Nigeria and Zaïre.

The genus name is in honour of Diogo Cão (c. 1450 – c. 1486), a Portuguese explorer.

Known species:

- Diogoa retivenia (S.Moore) Breteler
- Diogoa zenkeri (Engl.) Exell & Mendonça
