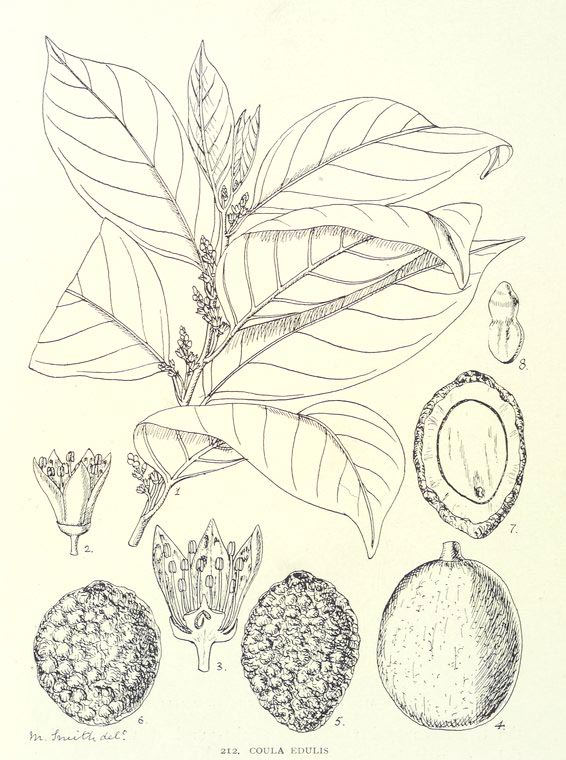

Conservation status
- Least Concern (IUCN 3.1)

Scientific classification
- Kingdom: Plantae
- Clade: Tracheophytes
- Clade: Angiosperms
- Clade: Eudicots
- Order: Santalales
- Family: Olacaceae
- Genus: Coula; Baill.
- Species: C. edulis

Binomial name
- Coula edulis Baill.

Synonyms
- Coula cabrae De Wild. & T.Durand; Coula edulis var. cabrae (De Wild. & T.Durand) J.Léonard; Coula utilis S.Moore

= Coula =

Species of flowering plant

Coula is a monotypic genus of flowering plants. It contains the sole species Coula edulis, a tree native to western and west-central tropical Africa, ranging from Guinea to the Democratic Republic of the Congo. Both the timber and nuts have a number of uses.

== Description ==
It is an evergreen tree growing to a height of 25–38 metres (82–125 ft), and has a dense crown that can cast deep shade. The leaves are arranged alternately, simple, 10–30 centimetres (4–12 in) long and 4 cm broad, with an entire margin and an acuminate apex. The flowers are produced from April to June, and are greenish yellow, with either four or five petals.

The nut is an ellipsoidal drupe available from August to January, 3–4 cm long, with flesh surrounding the kernel, 5–6 mm thick, smooth in texture and can be red or green. The kernel shell is extremely hard and makes germination difficult. The nuts are usually found under the mother trees.

Common names include Gabon nut and African walnut. It is not related to the walnut, being so named because its nuts bear a superficial resemblance to the walnut.

Local names

- Anamemila, Apopo, Sida, in Nigeria
- Bombulu in Zaire
- Dibetou in Gabon and Ivory Coast
- Mpengwa in Ghana

Dialect names

- Akiouhia in Tchaman
- Atsan in Atié
- Bogüe in Agni
- Howôtou in Oubi
- Ouatou in Kroumen
- Séatou or Sratou in Guéré

The plant is a source of minquartynoic acid, a rare fatty acid.

Coula is a monotypic genus of trees native to tropical Africa, containing the sole species Coula edulis Baill. Currently placed in the family Olacaceae, recent genetic evidence suggests this family is paraphyletic, and that Coula and related genera should be transferred to a new family Strombosiaceae.

== Distribution and habitat ==
The species is native to tropical western Africa from Guinea to the Democratic Republic of the Congo. It is plentiful in the Democratic Republic of Congo, Nigeria, and Sierra Leone.

It prefers tropical regions and is tolerant of light shade. It can be found in the top canopy of forest as well as the lower story and has no special soil requirements.

== Uses ==
Every part of the tree is used in both raw and finished states. Its timber and nuts are used extensively. The bark is used locally to produce rinses or enemas for loin pains or kidney problems. The wood is used to make pilings for bridges and railway ties in addition to charcoal and standard construction.

=== Nuts ===
The nut is 50% fat of which 87% is oleic acid. The flavour is mild and is said to be between the flavour of hazelnuts and chestnuts. Used in a variety of ways it can be boiled, roasted and fermented before being eaten. The nuts can be used in recipes and mixed with meats. It is also a source of cooking oil and ground flour. The nut is a favoured food item of chimpanzees, though the tough shell necessitates the use of a rock as hammer to gain access to the kernel.
