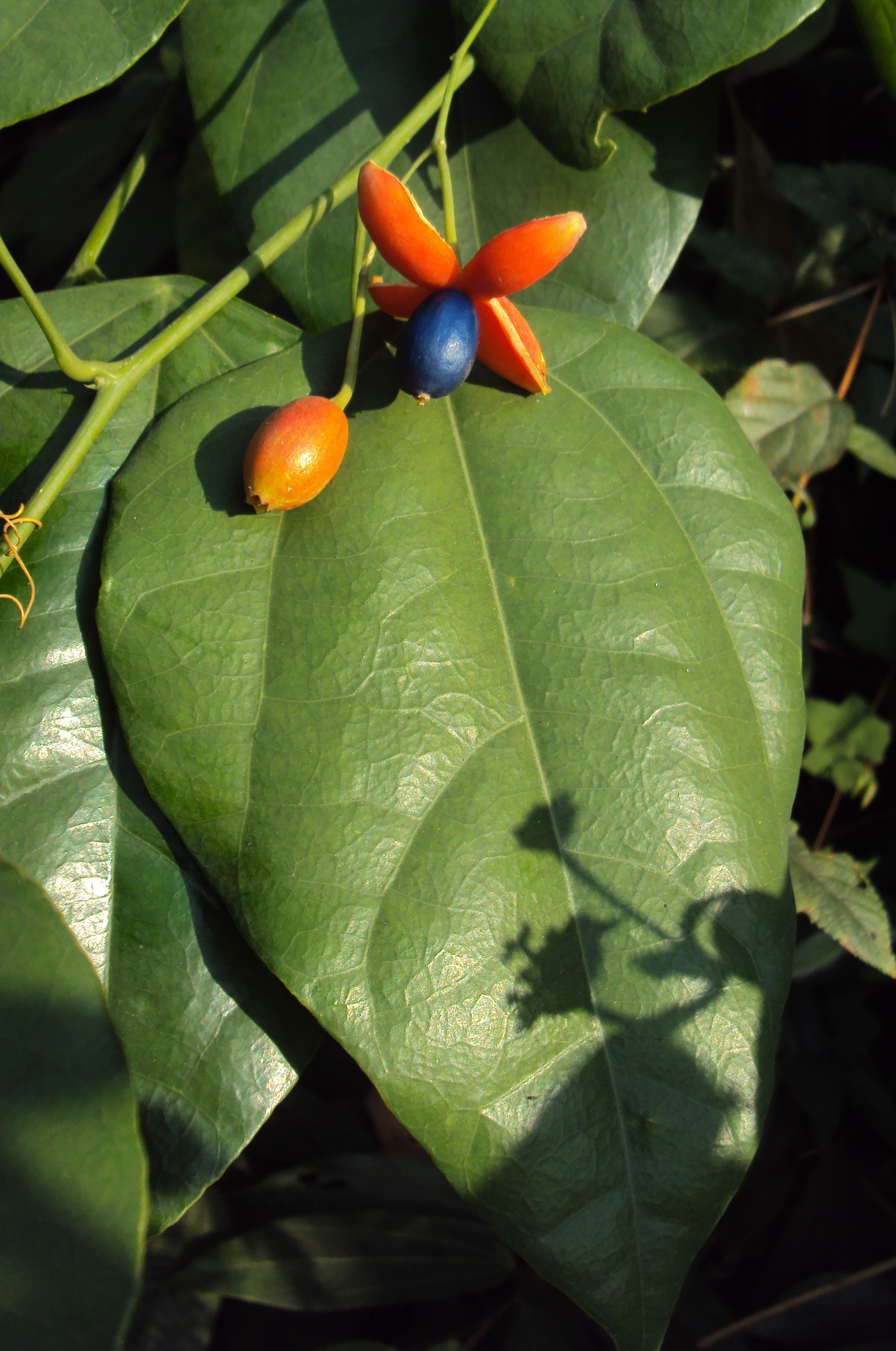
- Erythropalum scandens

Scientific classification
- Kingdom: Plantae
- Clade: Tracheophytes
- Clade: Angiosperms
- Clade: Eudicots
- Order: Santalales
- Family: Olacaceae
- Genus: Erythropalum; Blume
- Species: E. scandens

Binomial name
- Erythropalum scandens Blume

Synonyms
- Modeccopsis vaga Griff. Mackaya populifolia Arn. Erythropalum vagum (Griff.) Mast. Erythropalum triandrum Quisumb. & Merr. Erythropalum populifolium Mast. Erythropalum grandifolium Elmer; Decastrophia inconspicua Griff. Dactylium vagum Griff.

= Erythropalum =

Genus of flowering plants

Erythropalum is a monotypic genus containing the species Erythropalum scandens and currently placed in Erythropalaceae section of the family Olacaceae. Its native range is India and S. China and Indo-China to Malesia, with no subspecies listed in the Catalogue of Life. Its name in Vietnamese is dây hương or bò khai.

In Vietnam, E. scandens leaves may be used as a vegetable in some soups and stir fry dishes.

== Gallery ==
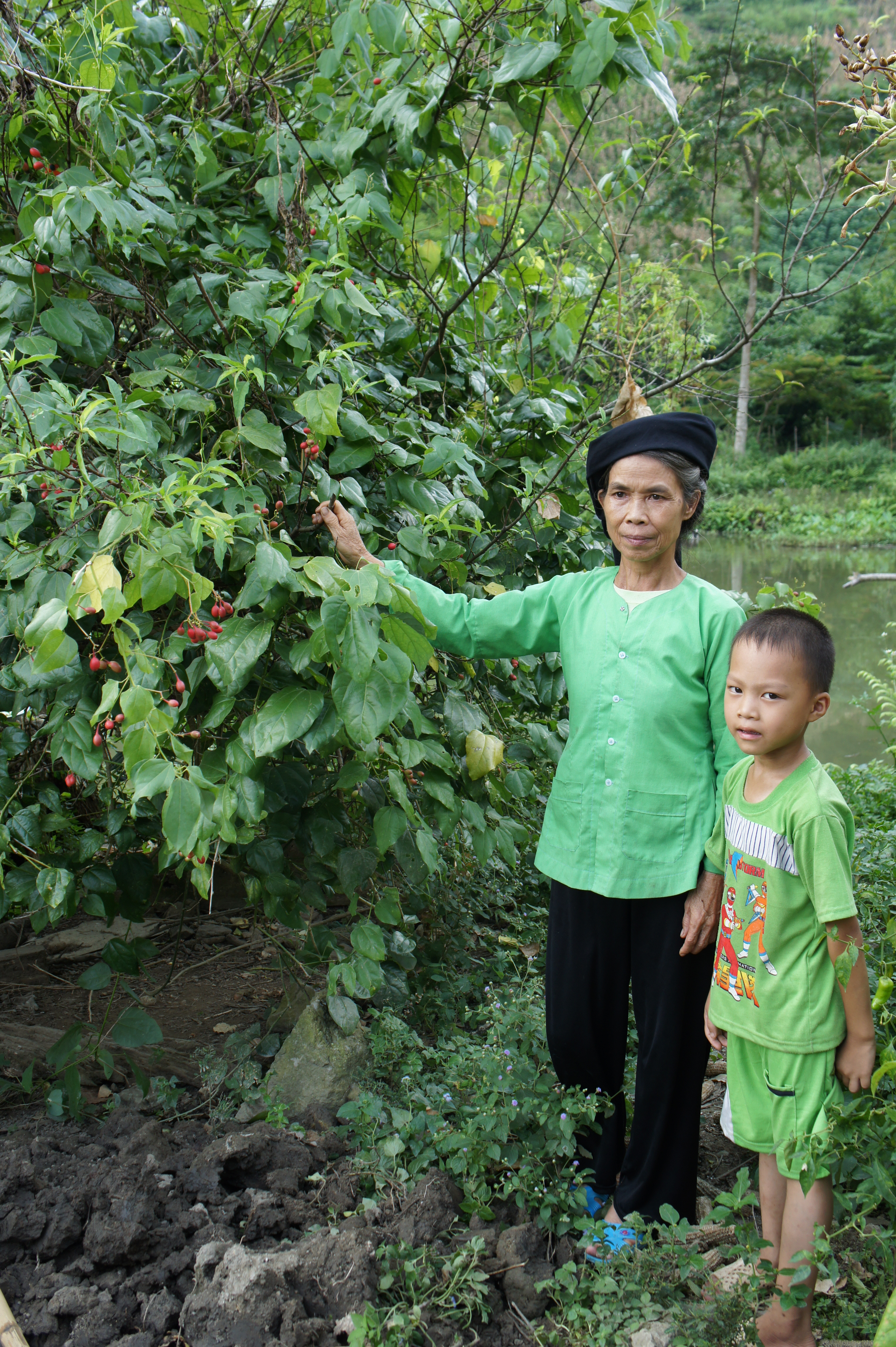

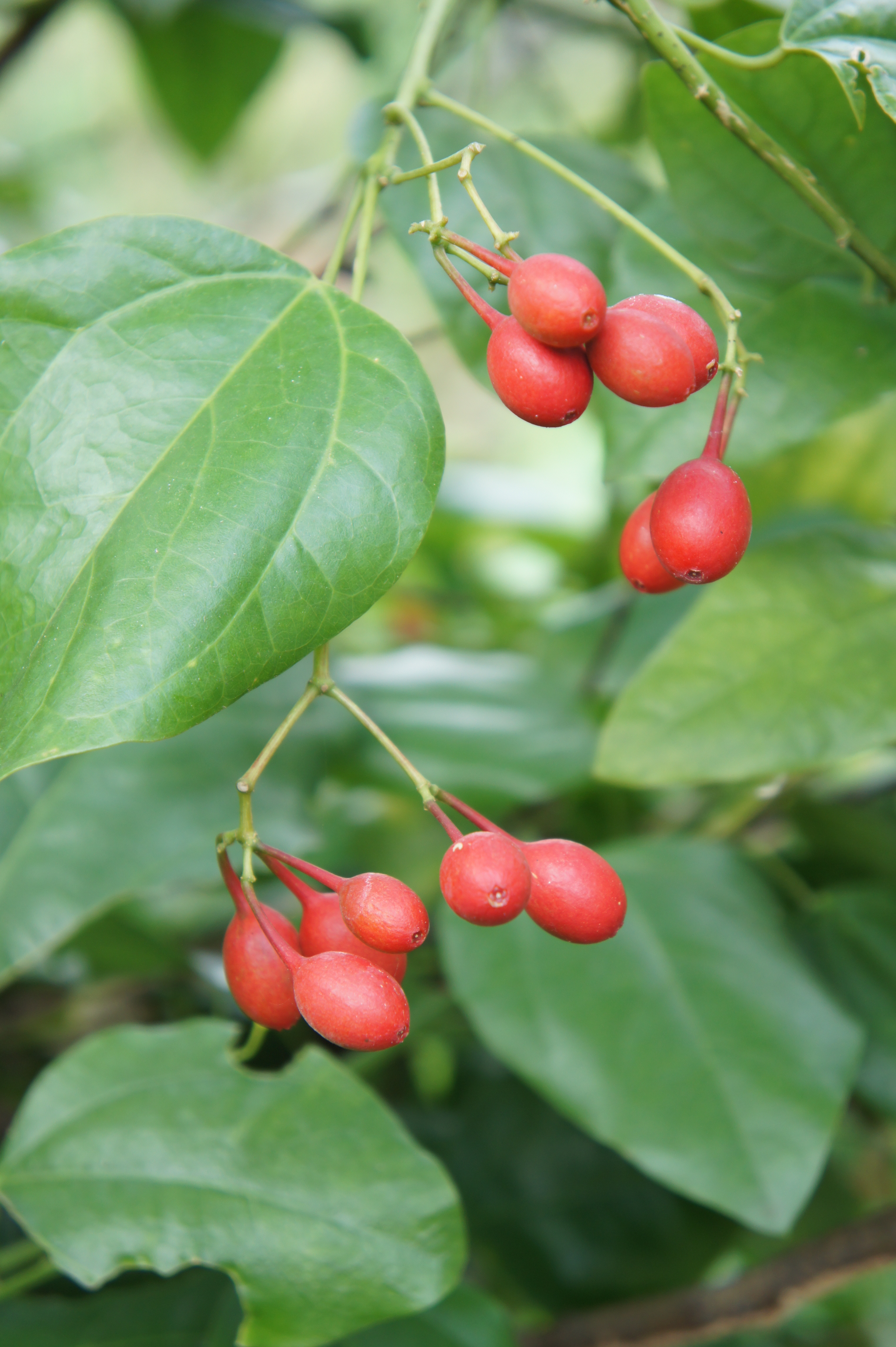

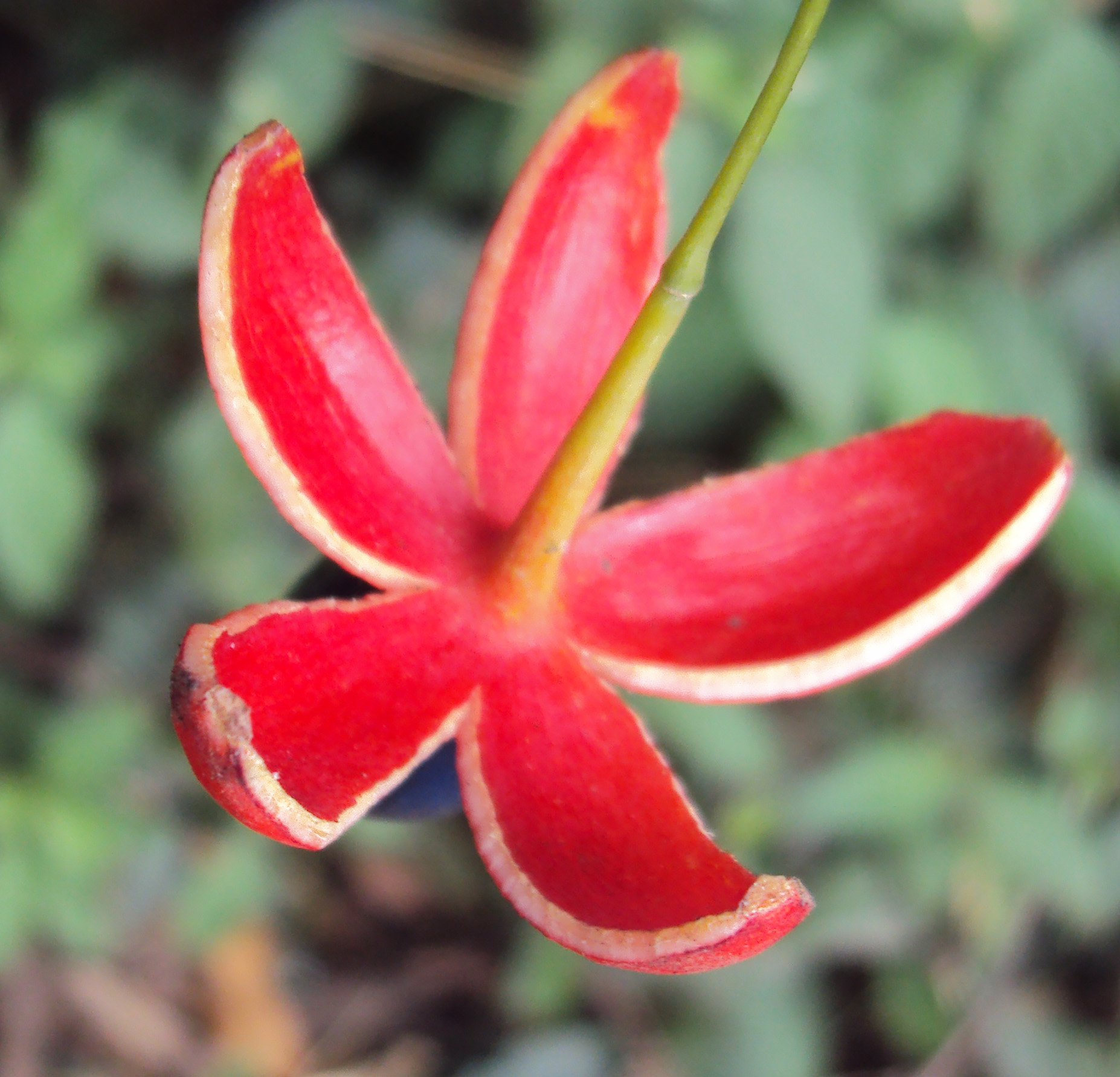

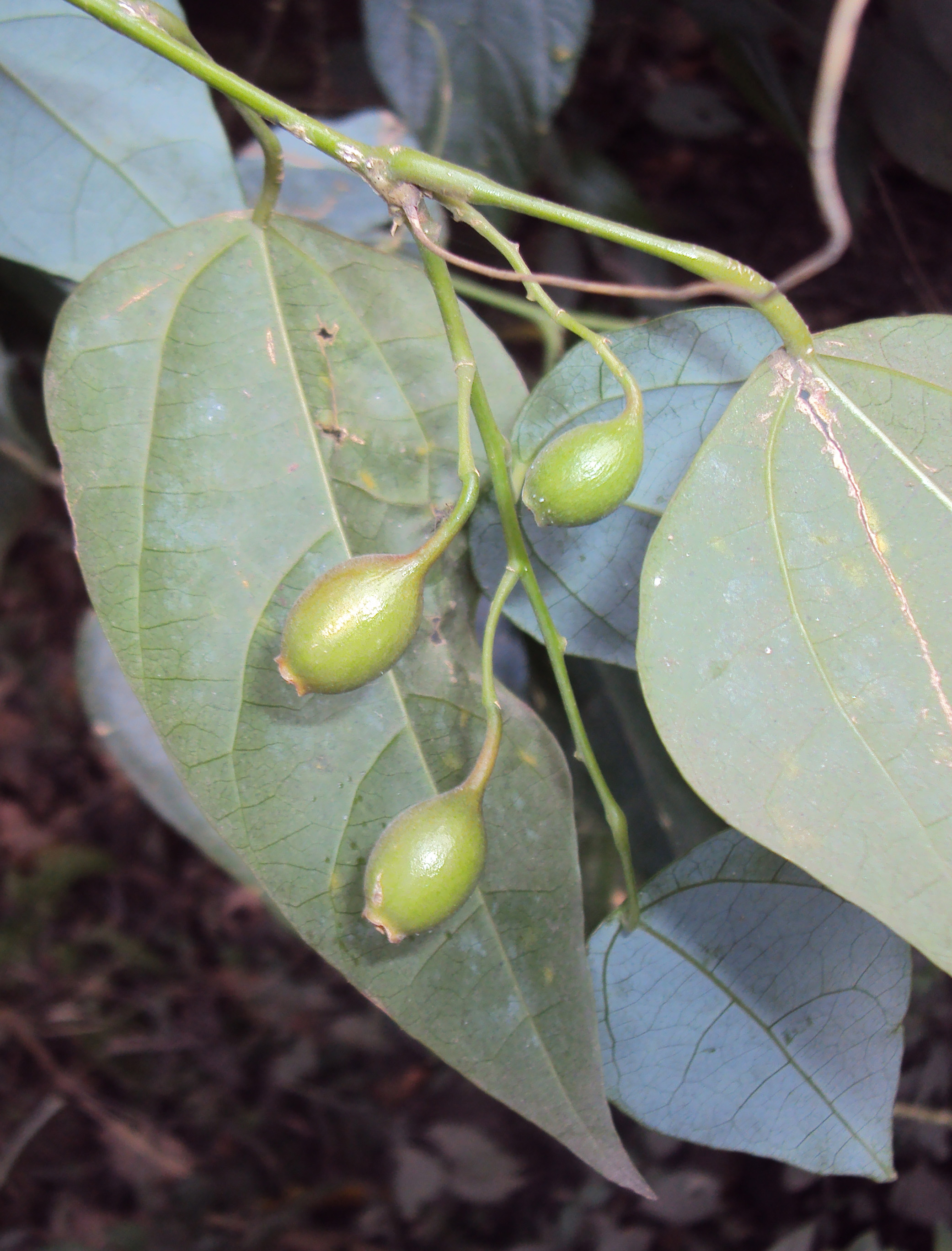

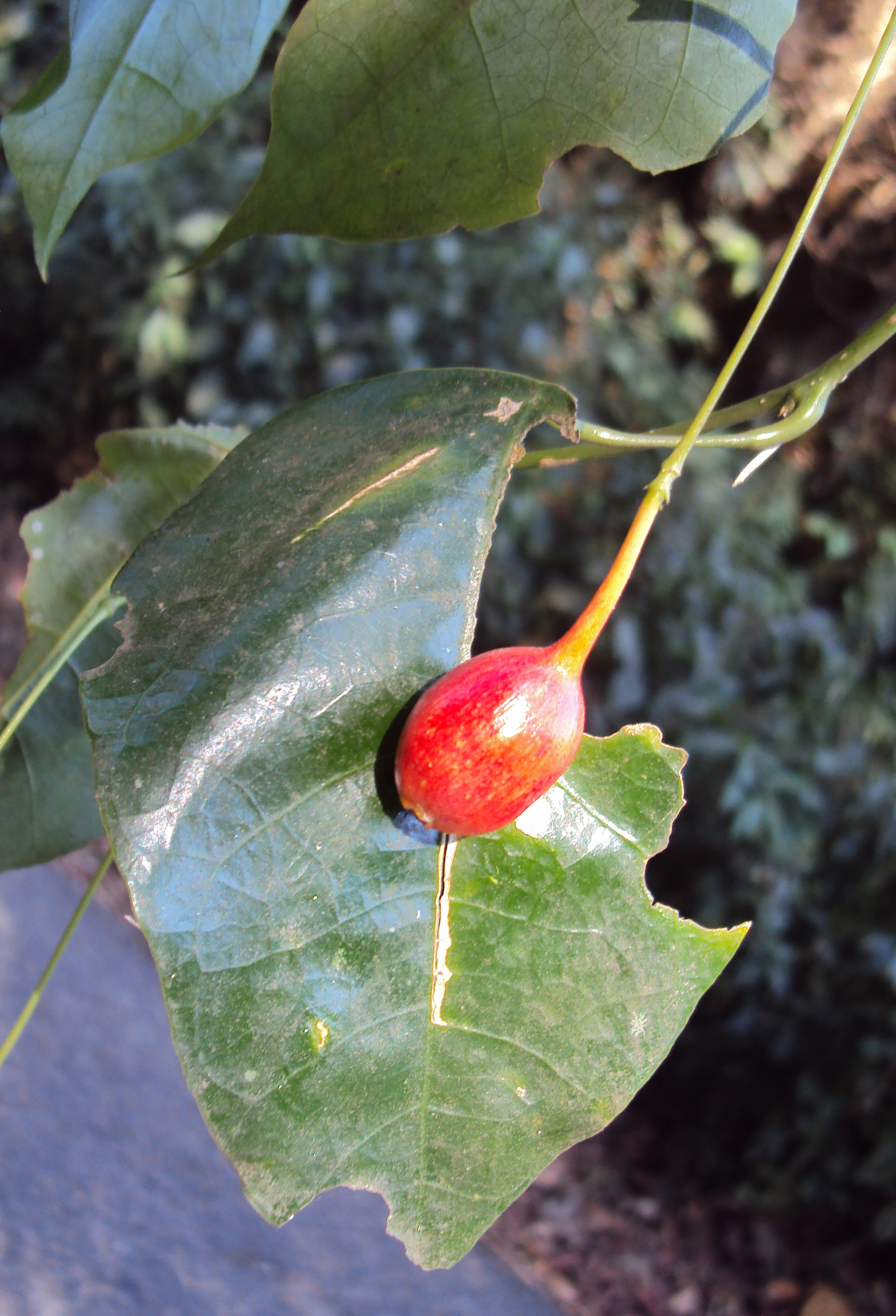

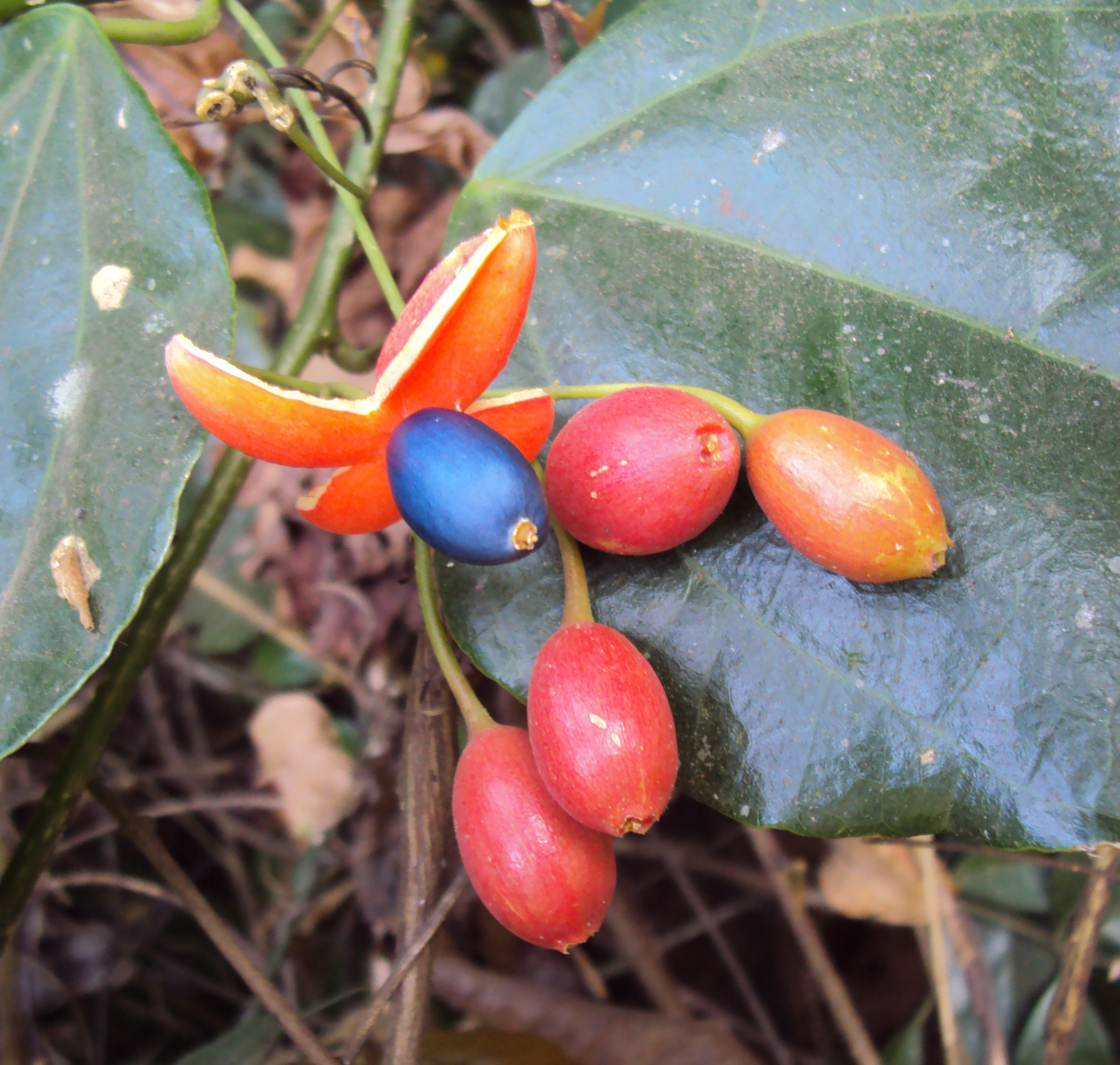
