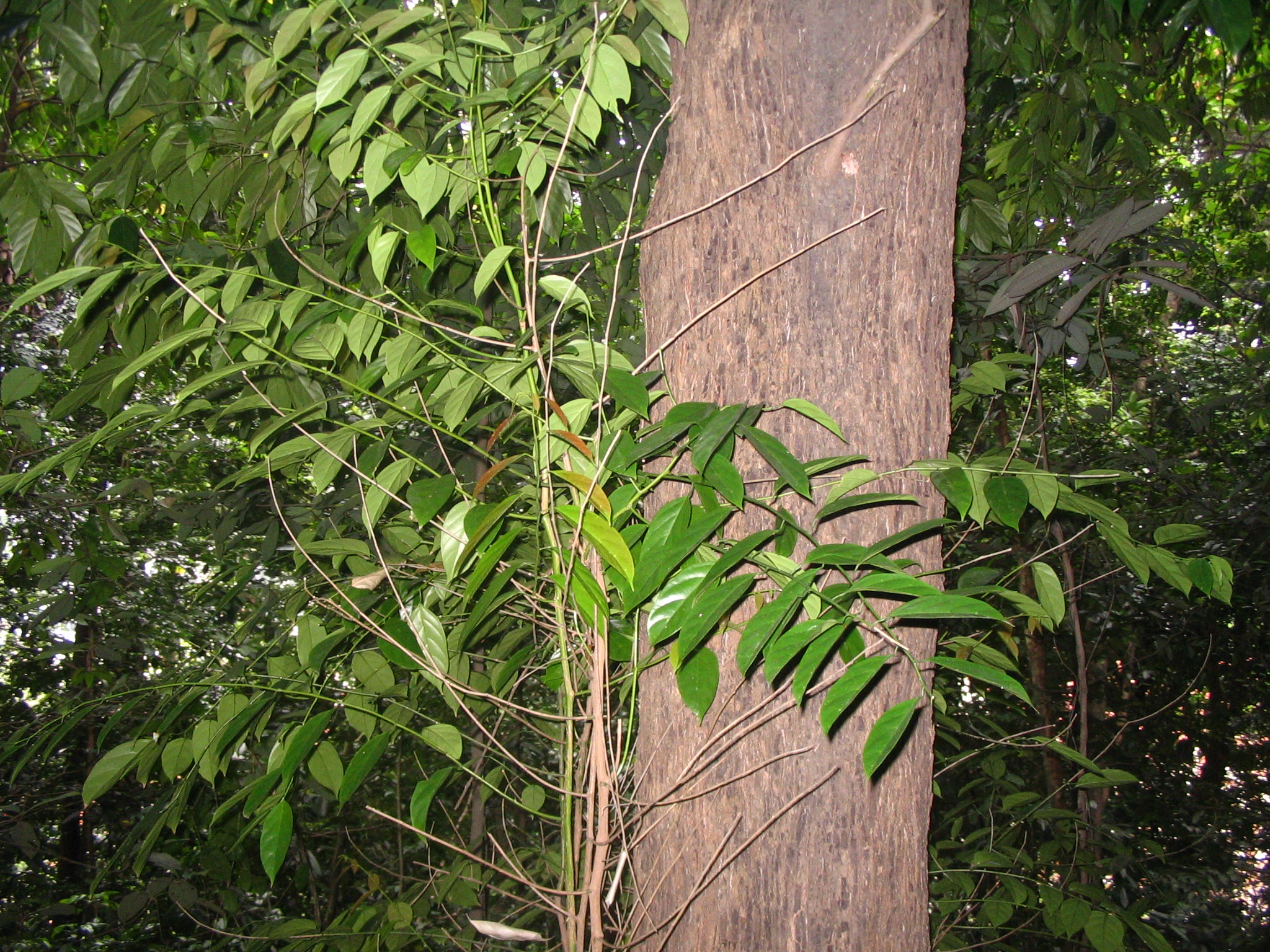
- Scorodocarpus borneensis in Bukit Nanas Forest Reserve, Kuala Lumpur

Scientific classification
- Kingdom: Plantae
- Clade: Tracheophytes
- Clade: Angiosperms
- Clade: Eudicots
- Order: Santalales
- Family: Olacaceae
- Genus: Scorodocarpus; Becc.
- Species: S. borneensis

Binomial name
- Scorodocarpus borneensis (Baill.) Becc.

Synonyms
- Ximenia borneensis Baill.

= Scorodocarpus =

Genus of trees

Scorodocarpus (Malay 'kulim') is a monotypic genus of plant in the family Olacaceae. It has also been classified in the family Strombosiaceae. The generic name is from the Greek meaning "garlic fruit", referring to the smell of the fruit. As of April 2025, Plants of the World Online recognises the single species Scorodocarpus borneensis. The specific epithet borneensis means "of Borneo".

== Description ==
Scorodocarpus borneensis grows as a tree up to 40 metres (130 ft) tall with a trunk diameter of up to 80 centimetres (31 in). The fissured bark is grey to dark red or brown. The flowers are white. The round fruits are green and measure up to 5 cm (2 in) long. The fruits have a garlic smell and are cooked and eaten in Borneo. The tree's durable hard wood is locally used in construction.

== Distribution and habitat ==
Scorodocarpus borneensis grows naturally in Peninsular Thailand, Sumatra, the Lingga Islands, Peninsular Malaysia and Borneo. Its habitat is mixed dipterocarp forests, occasionally in seasonally flooded forests.
