= Cabo de Santa Maria (Angola) =

Cape in Angola

Cabo Santa Maria
- Cape
- Map of Angola
- Coordinates: 13°25′07″S 12°32′00″E
- Location: Angola
- Offshore water bodies: Atlantic Ocean

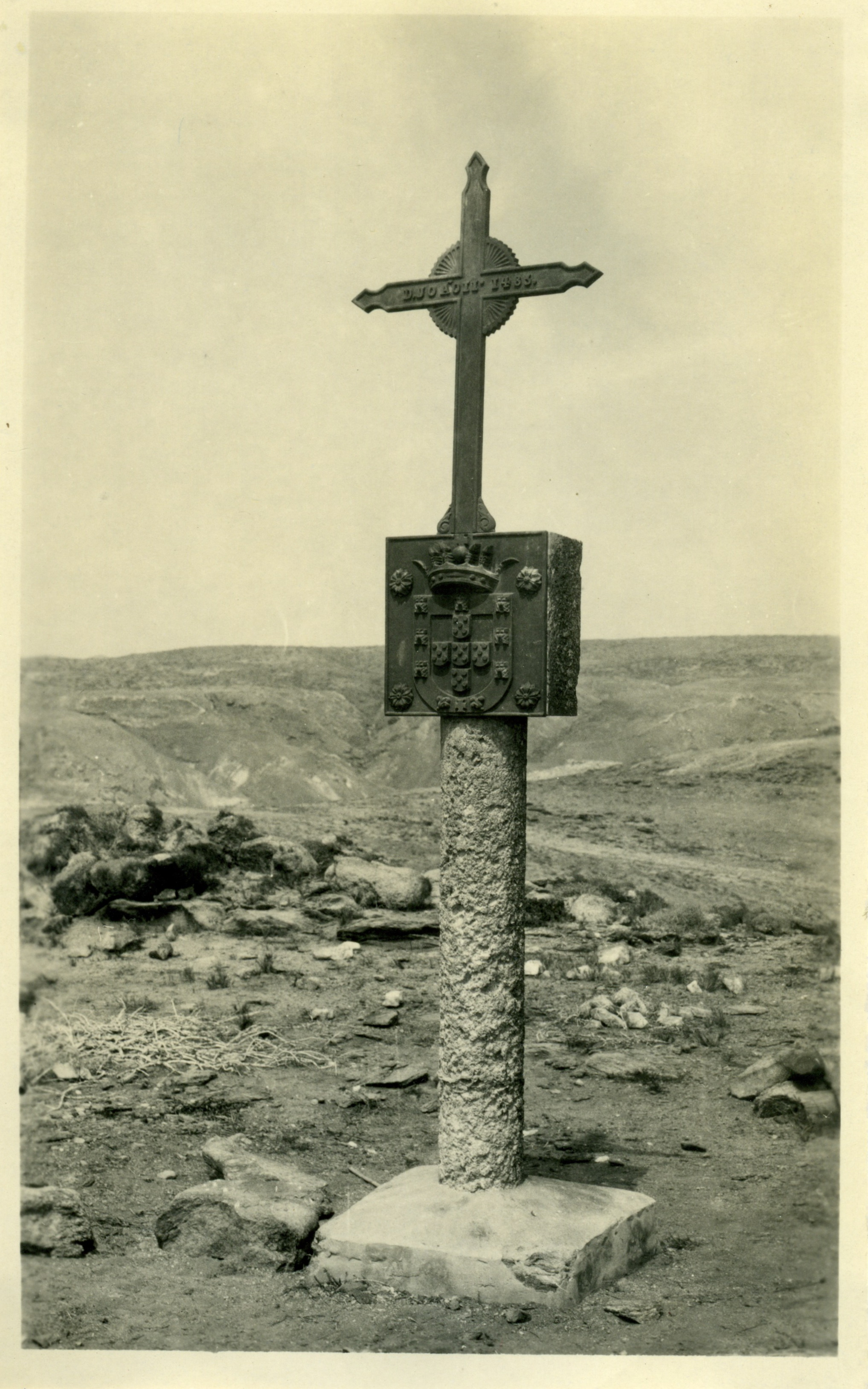
Padrão de Stº Agostinho by Diogo Cão at Cabo Santa Maria

Cabo de Santa Maria is a cape in Angola some 200 km southwest of Lobito and 130 km southwest of Benguela.

== History ==
In 1482, the Portuguese navigator Diogo Cão reached Cabo de Santa Maria on his first journey to explore the African West coast south of the Equator. The cape was first called Cabo do Lobo (Wolf's Cape).

To mark the place as being under Portuguese sovereignty, Diogo Cão erected a stone cross, a Padrão. It carried the following text:

Na era da criação do mundo de 6681 anos, e do nascimento de Nosso Senhor Jesus de 1482 anos, o mui alio, mui excelente e poderoso principe, el-rel D. João II, de Portugal, mandou descobrir esta terra e põr estes padrões por Diogo Cão, escudeiro de sua caso.

In the year 6681 after creation and in the year 1482 after the birth of Our Lord Jesus the august, most excellent and mighty king John II of Portugal ordered the discovery of this land and the erection of this stone cross by Diogo Cão, squire of his court.

It remained there until its transfer to Lisbon in 1892.
