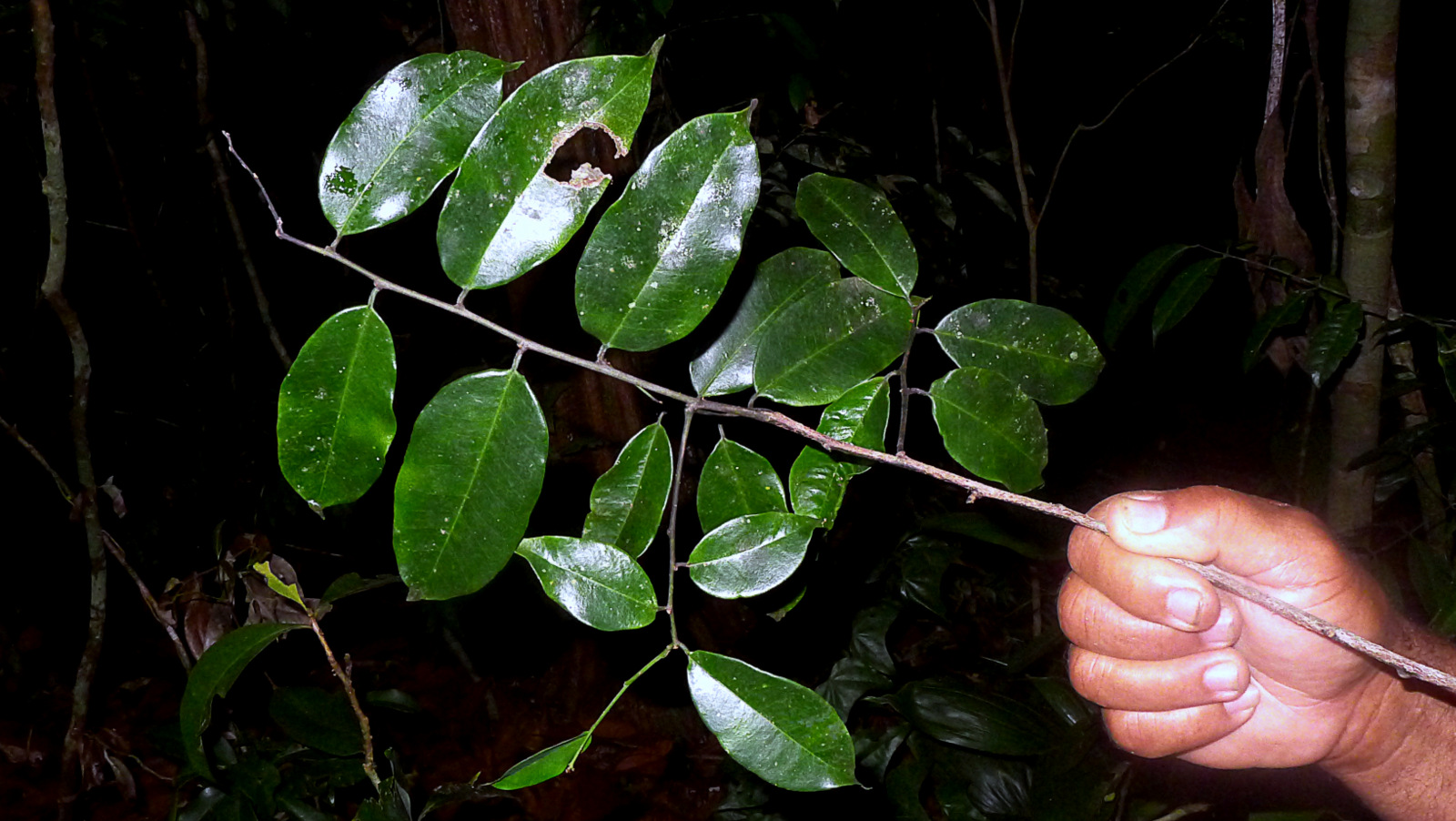
- Aptandra tubicina

Scientific classification
- Kingdom: Plantae
- Clade: Tracheophytes
- Clade: Angiosperms
- Clade: Eudicots
- Order: Santalales
- Family: Olacaceae
- Genus: Aptandra; Miers

Synonyms
- Heterotypic Synonyms: Lecomtea Pierre ex Tiegh.

= Aptandra =

Genus of flowering plants

Aptandra is a genus of flowering plants. In the APG IV system, the genus is placed in the family Olacaceae. Other sources place it in the segregate family Aptandraceae.

It is native to Angola, Bolivia, Brazil, Cameroon, the Central African Republic, Colombia, the Democratic Republic of the Congo, Ecuador, Equatorial Guinea, Gabon, Ghana, Guyana, Ivory Coast, Nigeria, Peru, the Republic of the Congo, and Venezuela.

== Species ==
Accepted species include:

- Aptandra caudata A.H.Gentry & Ortiz
- Aptandra liriosmoides Spruce ex Miers
- Aptandra tubicina (Poepp.) Benth. ex Miers
- Aptandra zenkeri Engl.
