= Douradoa =

Scientific classification
- Kingdom: Plantae
- Clade: Tracheophytes
- Clade: Angiosperms
- Clade: Eudicots
- Order: Santalales
- Family: Olacaceae
- Genus: Douradoa; Sleumer
- Species: D. consimilis

Binomial name
- Douradoa consimilis Sleumer

Genus of plants

Douradoa is a monotypic genus of flowering plants belonging to the family Olacaceae. The only species is Douradoa consimilis.

Its native range is Brazil.
