= Nervonic acid =

24-Carbon monounsaturated fatty acid

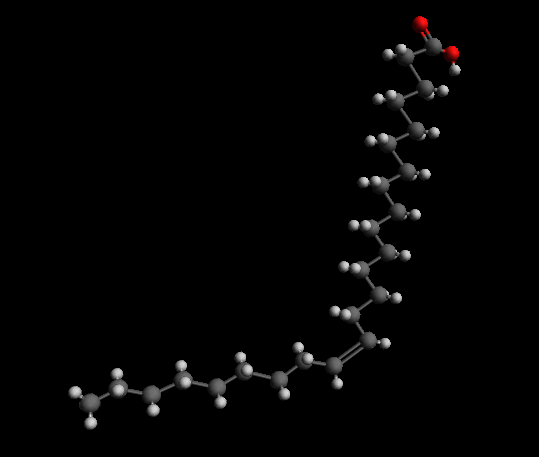

Names
- IUPAC name (Z)-Tetracos-15-enoic acid
- Other names cis-15-Tetracosenoic acid 24:1 cis, delta 15 or 24:1 omega 9

Identifiers
CAS Number	506-37-6
3D model (JSmol)	Interactive image
ChEBI	CHEBI:44247
ChEMBL	ChEMBL1173379
ChemSpider	4444565
ECHA InfoCard	100.108.655
KEGG	C08323
PubChem CID	5281120
UNII	91OQS788BE
CompTox Dashboard (EPA)	DTXSID801009308
- InChI: InChI=1S/C24H46O2/c1-2-3-4-5-6-7-8-9-10-11-12-13-14-15-16-17-18-19-20-21-22-23-24(25)26/h9-10H,2-8,11-23H2,1H3,(H,25,26)/b10-9- Key: GWHCXVQVJPWHRF-KTKRTIGZSA-N; InChI=1/C24H46O2/c1-2-3-4-5-6-7-8-9-10-11-12-13-14-15-16-17-18-19-20-21-22-23-24(25)26/h9-10H,2-8,11-23H2,1H3,(H,25,26)/b10-9- Key: GWHCXVQVJPWHRF-KTKRTIGZBL
- SMILES: O=C(O)CCCCCCCCCCCCC\C=C/CCCCCCCC

Properties
Chemical formula	C_{24}H_{46}O_{2}
Molar mass	366.62 g/mol
Melting point	42 to 43 °C (108 to 109 °F; 315 to 316 K)
- Except where otherwise noted, data are given for materials in their standard state (at 25 °C [77 °F], 100 kPa). verify (what is ?) Infobox references

Nervonic acid (24:1, n−9) is a fatty acid. It is a monounsaturated analog of lignoceric acid (24:0). It is also known as selacholeic acid and cis-15-tetracosenoic acid. Its name derives from the Latin word nervus, meaning nerve or sinew.

It exists in nature as an elongation product of oleic acid (18:1 Δ9). Its immediate precursor is erucic acid. Nervonic acid is particularly abundant in the white matter of animal brains and in peripheral nervous tissue where nervonyl sphingolipids are enriched in the myelin sheath of nerve fibers.

This acid is among the group of cerebrosides, which are fatty acids of the glycosphingolipids group, which are components of muscles and the nervous system, accounting for approximately 40% of the total fatty acids in sphingolipids.

== Structure ==
As it is defined as a monounsaturated fatty acid, it has one double bond in the fatty acid chain and all the remaining carbon atoms are single-bonded.

It is classified in the sub-group of very long chain fatty acids (VLCFA), which includes molecules containing more than 20 carbon atoms. It has specifically 24-carbon backbone and the sole C=C double bond originating from the methyl end is in n-9 or omega-9 (ω-9).

== Functions ==
Nervonic acid position in fatty acids classification

Nervonic acid may be involved in the growth and maintenance of nerve tissue as a regulator of Ca^{2+} ion channels in the cell membranes of nerve tissue.

== Sources ==
Content (mg/100 g) from various sources
Plant sources
Brassica oilseeds	69–83
Flaxseed	64
Animal sources
King salmon (Chinook)	140

Nervonic acid occurs in seed oil of plants, where significant amounts are contained. Indeed, more than 10% of the lipids contain nervonic acid, usually in the form of triglycerides. The seed oils of Lunaria species (Lunaria biennis or Lunaria annua, for example) are a quite important source of this long chain fatty acid, since they contain over 20% of it in the triglyceride lipid. Nervonic acid is also found in Cardamine gracea, Heliophila longifola, and Malania oleifera. In all these species, 24:1 usually is esterified at the sn-1 and sn-3 positions on the glycerol backbone. Other sources can be the molds Neocallimastix frontalis, the bacterium Pseudomonas atlantica, the yeast Saccharomyces cerevisiae, and the marine diatom Nitzschia cylindrus.

Nervonic acid was first isolated from the brains of sharks and its molecular structure was determined over a century ago; due to this, the acid is also known as shark oil acid. Scientists found that shark brains could repair themselves quickly after being damaged, suggesting that nervonic acid had the ability to promote the repair and regeneration of nerve fibers in damaged brain tissue.

== Additional references ==
- Appelqvist (1976) Lipids in Cruciferae. In: Vaughan JG, Macleod AJ (Eds), The Biology and the Chemistry of Cruciferae. Academic Press, London, UK, pp. 221–277.
