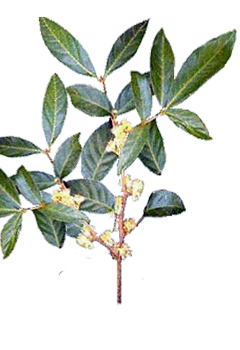
- Ptychopetalum olacoides

Scientific classification
- Kingdom: Plantae
- Clade: Tracheophytes
- Clade: Angiosperms
- Clade: Eudicots
- Order: Santalales
- Family: Olacaceae
- Genus: Ptychopetalum; Benth.

Species
- See text

= Ptychopetalum =

Genus of flowering plants

Ptychopetalum is a genus of flowering plants in the family Olacaceae, native to the Amazon rainforest. Indigenous name for the genus include marapuama, muirapuama and mirantã, translating roughly to 'potency wood'. The species are shrubs or small trees growing to about 14 feet (4.3 m) in height. Its leaves are short-petioled, up to 3 inches (7.6 cm) in length and 2 inches (5.1 cm) in breadth light green on upper surface, dark brown on lower surface. The inflorescences consist of short axillary racemes of four to six flowers each. The root is strongly tough and fibrous, internally light brown with thin bark and broad wood, has a faint odor, and tastes slightly saline and acrid.

== Species ==
- Ptychopetalum anceps Oliv.
- Ptychopetalum olacoides Benth.
- Ptychopetalum petiolatum Oliv.
- Ptychopetalum uncinatum Anselmino

== Uses ==
Ptychopetalum olacoides has been studied for treatment of dark pigmentation around the eyes. The root and bark are used for a variety of ailments by indigenous peoples in the Rio Negro area of South America; on the other hand, Western society is mostly unfamiliar with this medicine and has not invested much in exploring its potential usefulness using the scientific method.
