= Engomegoma =

Scientific classification
- Kingdom: Plantae
- Clade: Tracheophytes
- Clade: Angiosperms
- Clade: Eudicots
- Order: Santalales
- Family: Olacaceae
- Genus: Engomegoma; Breteler
- Species: E. gordonii

Binomial name
- Engomegoma gordonii Breteler

Genus of plants

Engomegoma is a monotypic genus of flowering plants belonging to the family Olacaceae. The only species is Engomegoma gordonii.

Its native range is Western Central Tropical Africa.
