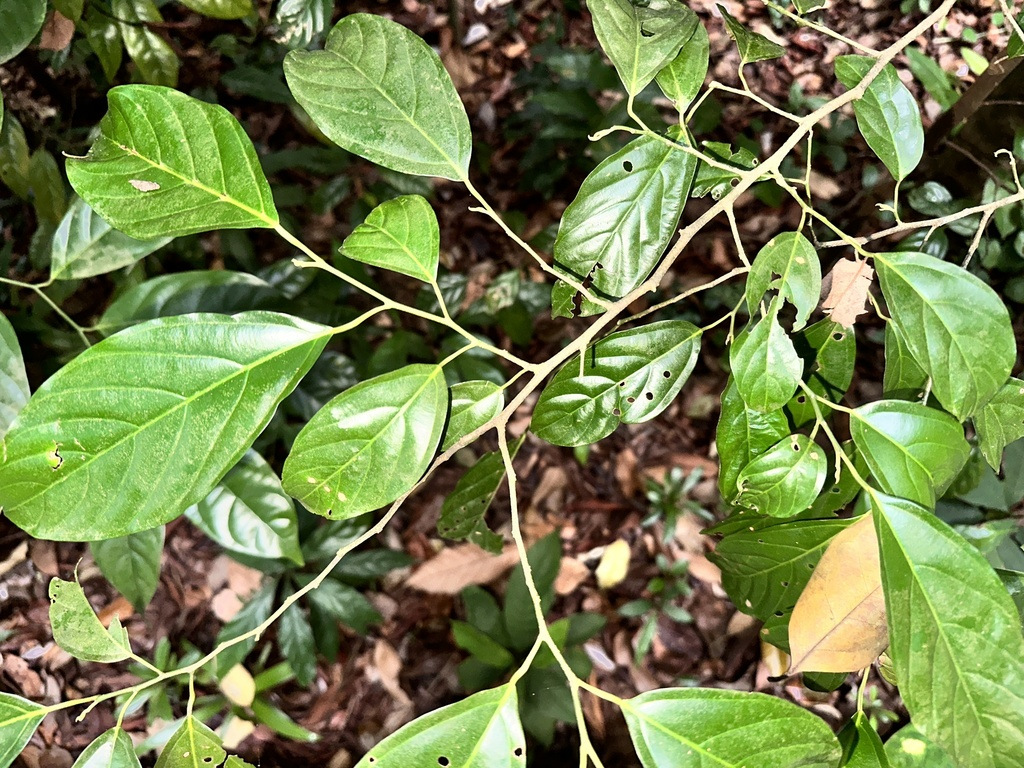

Conservation status
- Least Concern (IUCN 3.1)

Scientific classification
- Kingdom: Plantae
- Clade: Tracheophytes
- Clade: Angiosperms
- Clade: Eudicots
- Order: Santalales
- Family: Olacaceae
- Genus: Ochanostachys; Mast.
- Species: O. amentacea

Binomial name
- Ochanostachys amentacea Mast.

= Ochanostachys =

Genus of flowering plants

Ochanostachys is a genus of flowering plants with a single species, Ochanostachys amentacea. The genus is placed in the family Olacaceae in the APG IV system and by sources that use it. It may alternatively be placed in the family Coulaceae, if the split of Olacaceae into seven separate families is accepted. Ochanostachys amentacea is native to the Andaman Islands, Borneo, Peninsular Malaysia, the Nicobar Islands, Sumatra and Thailand.

The plant is a source of minquartynoic acid, a rare fatty acid.
