= Heisteria pallida =

Scientific classification
- Kingdom: Plantae
- Clade: Tracheophytes
- Clade: Angiosperms
- Clade: Eudicots
- Order: Santalales
- Family: Olacaceae
- Genus: Heisteria
- Species: H. pallida

Binomial name
- Heisteria pallida Engl. 1872

Species of flowering plant

Heisteria pallida is a plant species in the genus Heisteria found in Brazil.

The stem bark of H. pallida contains ourateacatechin (4′-O-methyl-(−)-epigallocatechin), ouratea-proanthocyanidin A (epiafzelechin-(4β→8)-4′-O-methyl-(−)-epigallocatechin) and the trimeric propelargonidin epiafzelechin-(4β→8)-epiafzelechin-(4β→8)-4′-O-methyl-(−)-epigallocatechin.
