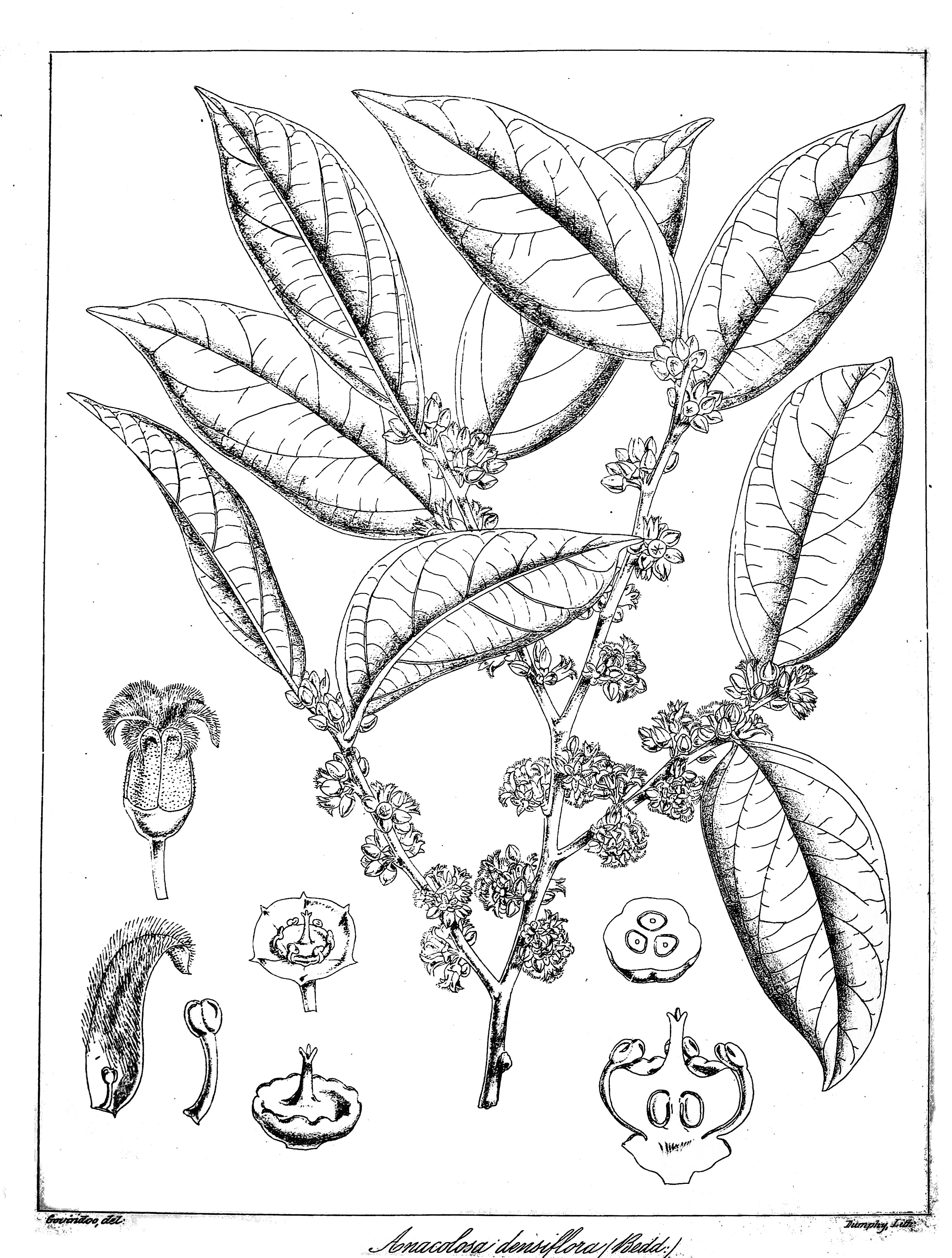
- A. densiflora Bedd.

Scientific classification
- Kingdom: Plantae
- Clade: Tracheophytes
- Clade: Angiosperms
- Clade: Eudicots
- Order: Santalales
- Family: Olacaceae
- Genus: Anacolosa (Blume) Blume

Species
- See text

= Anacolosa =

Genus of flowering plants

Anacolosa is a plant genus of 15 to 22 species. In the APG IV system, the genus is placed in the family Olacaceae. Other sources place it in the segregate family Aptandraceae. The generic name is from the Greek anakolos, meaning "knotted", referring to the calyx cup rim.

== Description ==
Anacolosa species grow as shrubs or trees. The flowers are bisexual. The fruits are drupes (pitted) with a thin, fleshy pericarp.

== Distribution and habitat ==
Anacolosa species are distributed throughout the tropics, including Malesia.

== Species ==
As of July 2021, Plants of the World Online accepted the following species:

- Anacolosa casearioides Cavaco & Keraudren
- Anacolosa cauliflora Sleumer
- Anacolosa clarkii Pierre
- Anacolosa crassipes (Kurz) Kurz
- Anacolosa densiflora Bedd.
- Anacolosa frutescens (Blume) Blume
- Anacolosa glochidiiformis Kaneh. & Hatus.
- Anacolosa griffithii Mast.
- Anacolosa ilicoides Mast.
- Anacolosa insularis Christoph.
- Anacolosa lutea Gillespie
- Anacolosa papuana Schellenb.
- Anacolosa pervilleana Baill.
- Anacolosa poilanei Gagnep.
- Anacolosa uncifera Louis & Boutique
