= Malania =

Conservation status
- Vulnerable (IUCN 2.3)

Scientific classification
- Kingdom: Plantae
- Clade: Tracheophytes
- Clade: Angiosperms
- Clade: Eudicots
- Order: Santalales
- Family: Olacaceae
- Genus: Malania; Chun & S.K.Lee
- Species: M. oleifera

Binomial name
- Malania oleifera Chun & S.K.Lee

Genus of trees

Malania oleifera is a species of plant in the Olacaceae family, the only species in the genus Malania. It is a medium-sized tree, 10–20 metres (33–66 ft) tall, that is endemic to southern China where it can be found in Western Guangxi and South-Eastern Yunnan provinces. Known as "garlic-fruit tree" or 'suantouguo' (蒜头果) by local communities due to its garlic-shaped fruits, it is threatened by logging and habitat loss. Notable for its substantial phytochemical value, its seed has the highest-known proportion of nervonic acid (C_{24}H_{46}O_{2}, PubChem CID: 5281120). Nervonic acid is an important component in myelin biosynthesis in the central and peripheral nervous system, and has been proposed to enhance human brain function. To aid this research its 1.51 Gigabase genome has been sequenced by researchers in China.
