= Maburea =

Scientific classification
- Kingdom: Plantae
- Clade: Tracheophytes
- Clade: Angiosperms
- Clade: Eudicots
- Order: Santalales
- Family: Olacaceae
- Genus: Maburea; Maas
- Species: M. trinervis

Binomial name
- Maburea trinervis Maas

Genus of plants

Maburea is a monotypic genus of flowering plants belonging to the family Olacaceae. The only species is Maburea trinervis.

Its native range is Guyana.
