= Tetrastylidium =

Scientific classification
- Kingdom: Plantae
- Clade: Tracheophytes
- Clade: Angiosperms
- Clade: Eudicots
- Order: Santalales
- Family: Olacaceae
- Genus: Tetrastylidium; Engl.

Genus of flowering plants

Tetrastylidium is a genus of flowering plants belonging to the family Olacaceae.

Its native range is Southern America.

Species:

- Tetrastylidium grandifolium (Baill.) Sleumer
- Tetrastylidium peruvianum Sleumer
