= Phanerodiscus =

Scientific classification
- Kingdom: Plantae
- Clade: Embryophytes
- Clade: Tracheophytes
- Clade: Spermatophytes
- Clade: Angiosperms
- Clade: Eudicots
- Order: Santalales
- Family: Olacaceae
- Genus: Phanerodiscus; Cavaco

Genus of plants

Phanerodiscus is a genus of flowering plants. In the APG IV system, the genus is placed in the family Olacaceae. Other sources place it in the segregate family Aptandraceae.

Its native range is Madagascar.

Species:

- Phanerodiscus capuronii Malécot, G.E.Schatz & Bosser
- Phanerodiscus diospyroidea Capuron
- Phanerodiscus perrieri Cavaco
