= Octoknema =

Scientific classification
- Kingdom: Plantae
- Clade: Tracheophytes
- Clade: Angiosperms
- Clade: Eudicots
- Order: Santalales
- Family: Olacaceae
- Genus: Octoknema; Pierre

Genus of flowering plants

Octoknema is a genus of flowering plants in the family Olacaceae.

It contains the following species:

- Octoknema affinis Pierre ex Tiegh.
- Octoknema aruwimiensis Mildbr.
- Octoknema bakossiensis Gosline & Malécot
- Octoknema belingensis Gosline & Malécot
- Octoknema borealis Hutch. & Dalziel
- Octoknema chailluensis Malécot & Gosline
- Octoknema dinklagei Engl.
- Octoknema genovefae Villiers
- Octoknema hulstaertiana Germ.
- Octoknema kivuensis Gosline & Malécot
- Octoknema klaineana Pierre
- Octoknema mokoko Gosline & Malécot
- Octoknema ogoouensis Malécot & Gosline
- Octoknema orientalis Mildbr.
