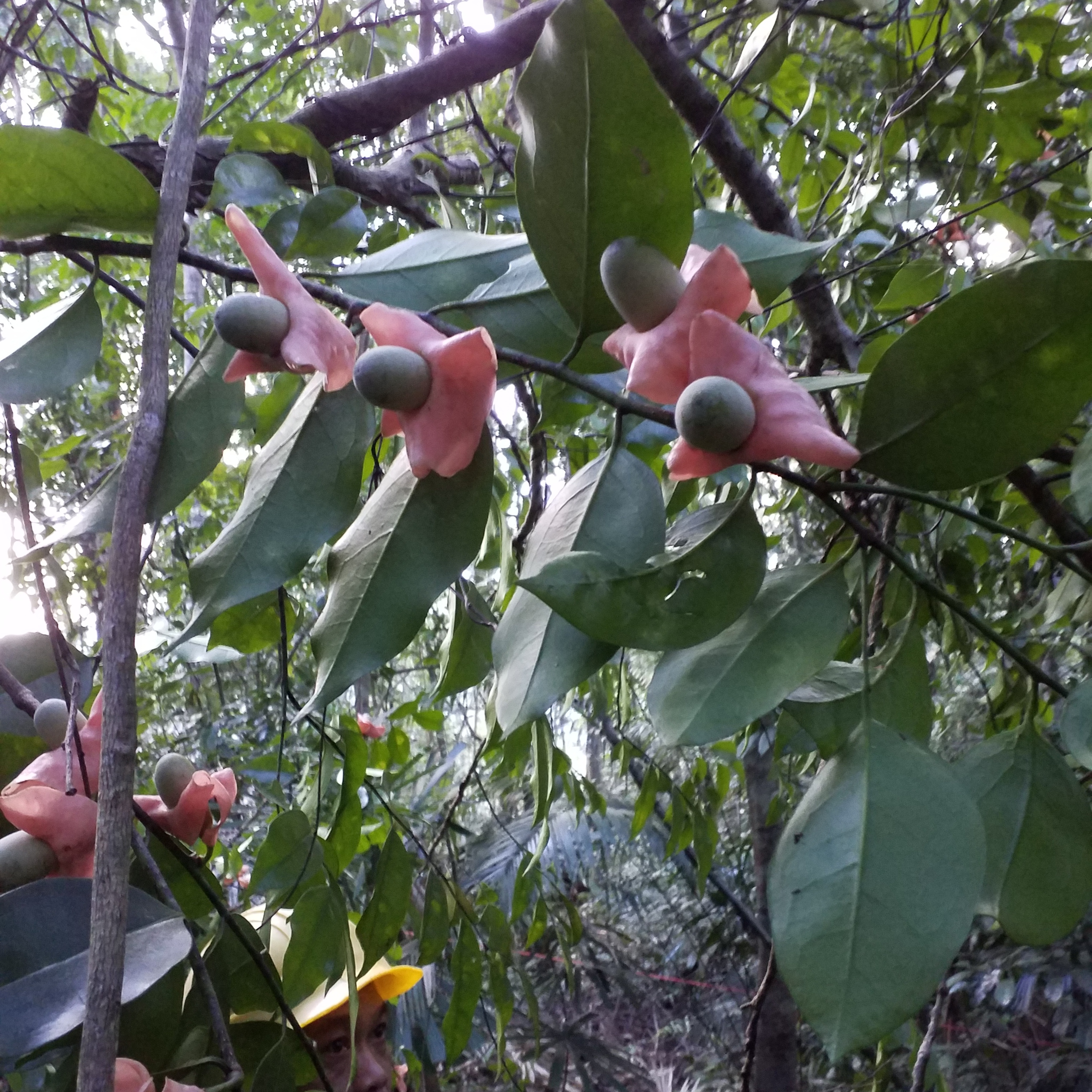

Scientific classification
- Kingdom: Plantae
- Clade: Tracheophytes
- Clade: Angiosperms
- Clade: Eudicots
- Order: Santalales
- Family: Olacaceae
- Genus: Harmandia; Pierre ex Baill.
- Species: H. mekongensis

Binomial name
- Harmandia mekongensis Baill.

Synonyms
- Harmandia flavescens (Laness.) Pierre ex F.Heim; Harmandia kunstleri King

= Harmandia mekongensis =

Species of plant

Harmandia mekongensis is a species of flowering plants. It is the only species in the monotypic genus of Harmandia. In the APG IV system, the genus is placed in the family Olacaceae. Other sources place it in the segregate family Aptandraceae.

Its native range is Indo-China to Sumatra, Malay Peninsula and Borneo in western Malesia.

== Taxonomy ==
The genus name of Harmandia is in honour of Jules Harmand (1845–1921), a French naval doctor and naturalist, who collected plants in south-east Asia, Japan and present-day Sri Lanka. The Latin specific epithet of mekongensis is named after the Mekong River from where the plant was collected. It was first described and published in Bull. Mens. Soc. Linn. Paris Vol.2 on page 770 in 1889.

== Description ==
The tree grows to a height between 6 and 40 metres. Its bark is flaky comprising an outer pale layer and a whitish or yellowish inner layer, the wood is pale yellow. The oblong or lanceolate leaves with 5–9 cm long and 2.5–4 cm wide, they have smooth surfaces and are brittle when dry.

The flowers grow from a raceme 1–1.5 long cm made of 5 flowers. Each flower is small and green. Its fruit is a fleshy, green ovoid drupe with an orange base 2.5–3 cm long by 1.3–2 wide growing out of a huge calyx; it changes colour to yellow or pink-orange when ripe. The seed is 0.5 mm long.
