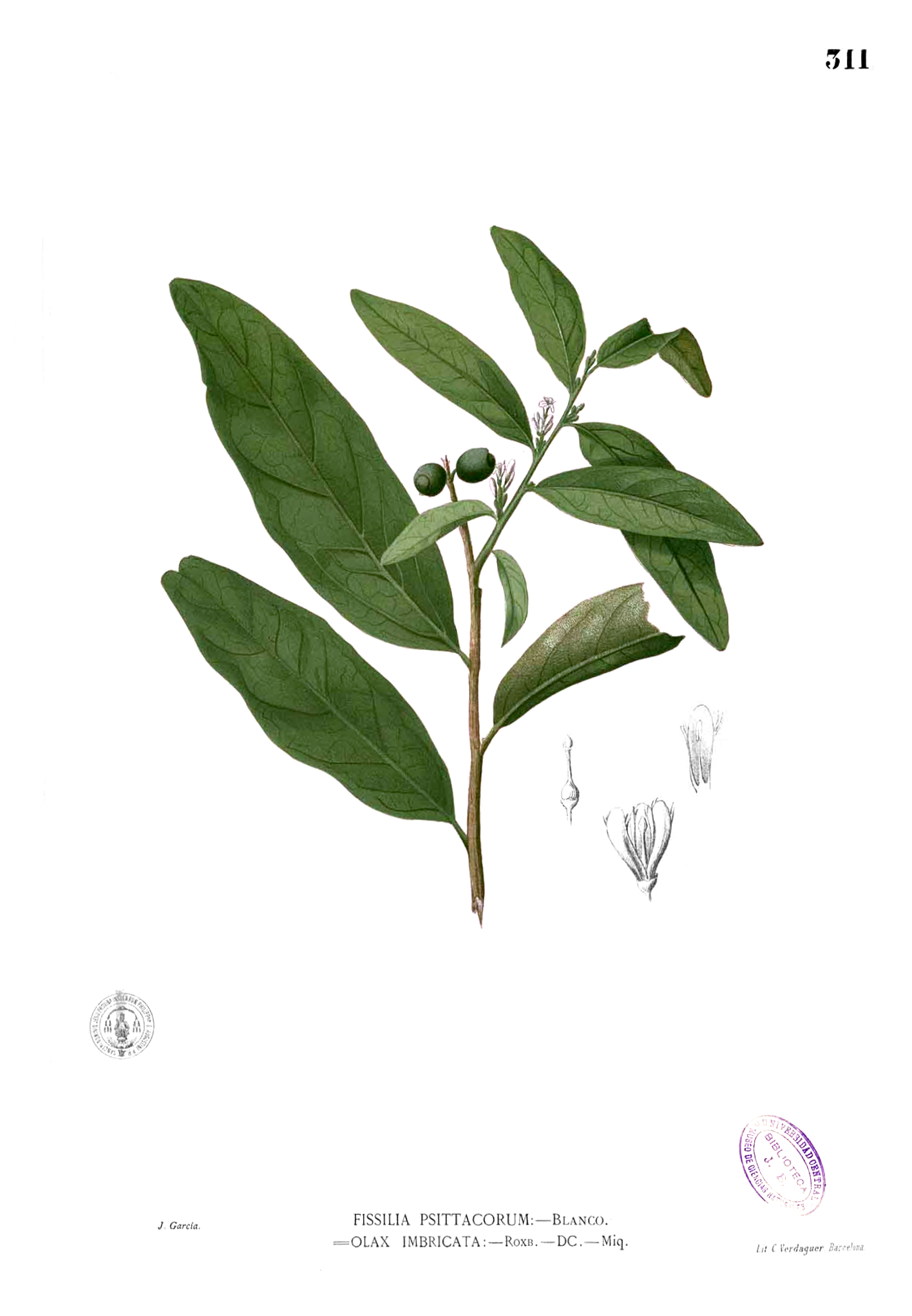
- Olax imbricata

Scientific classification
- Kingdom: Plantae
- Clade: Tracheophytes
- Clade: Angiosperms
- Clade: Eudicots
- Order: Santalales
- Family: Olacaceae; R.Br.

Genera
- See text

= Olacaceae =

Family of flowering plants

Olacaceae is a family of flowering plants in the order Santalales. They are woody plants, native throughout the tropical regions of the world. As of July 2021, the circumscription of the family varies; some sources maintain a broad family, others split it into seven segregate families.

== Taxonomy ==
The 1998 APG system and the 2003 APG II system assign it to the order Santalales in the clade core eudicots. Prior to the advent of molecular data, the circumscription of the family Olacaceae varied widely between different authorities. Among these various classifications, about 30 genera were included in the family. 15 genera are recognized for Olacaceae by the Germplasm Resources Information Network. The phylogenetic investigation published in 2008 recovered seven clades that were well-supported by molecular and morphological characters, but no formal taxonomic reorganization of the family was proposed. For this reason, Olacaceae in the broad sense was adopted by the APG III-system. The formal reconfiguration of this family (as well as the rest of the order Santalales) was published by Nickrent and co-workers in 2010 and this concept is shown below. Olacaceae in the broad sense was split into seven families, and the genus Schoepfia was placed with Arjona and Quinchamalium (both previously Santalaceae) in the family Schoepfiaceae.

== Genera ==
Olacaceae sensu stricto

- Dulacia - 13 species of South America
- Olax - ca 40 species of the Old World tropics
- Ptychopetalum - 2 species of tropical South America and 2 species of western and central Africa

Aptandraceae

- Anacolosa - 16 species of the Old World tropics
- Aptandra - 3 species in tropical America and 1 species in Africa
- Cathedra - 5 species of South America
- Chaunochiton - 3 species of tropical America
- Harmandia - one species in southeastern Asia
- Hondurodendron - one species in Honduras
- Ongokea - one species in Africa
- Phanerodiscus - 3 species of Madagascar

Ximeniaceae

- Curupira - one species in Amazonian Brazil
- Douradoa - one species in Brazil
- Malania - one species in China
- Ximenia - 10 species of the Old and New World tropics

Coulaceae

- Coula - one species in tropical western Africa
- Minquartia - one species in tropical America
- Ochanostachys - one species in western Malaysia

Strombosiaceae

- Diogoa - 2 species of tropical Africa
- Engomegoma - one species of tropical Africa
- Scorodocarpus - one species in tropical Asia
- Strombosia - 3 species of tropical Asia and 6 species of tropical Africa
- Strombosiopsis - 3 species of tropical Africa
- Tetrastylidium - 2 species of South America

Erythropalaceae

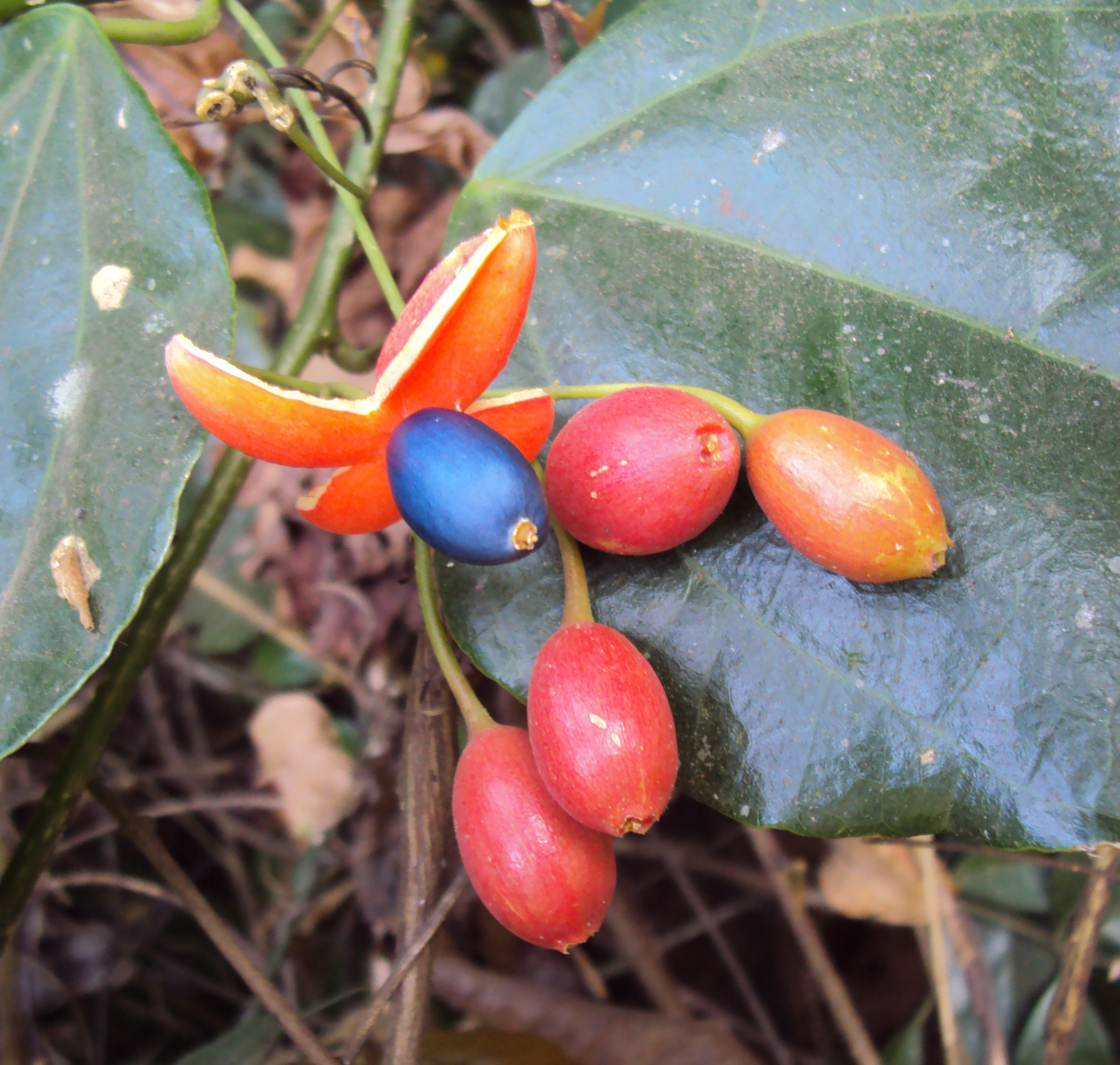
Erythropalum scandens

- Erythropalum - one species of Indomalaysia
- Heisteria - ca 33 species of tropical America and 3 species in Africa
- Maburea - one species in Guyana

Octoknemaceae

- Octoknema - 14 species of tropical Africa

Unplaced genus

- Brachynema - morphological cladistic analysis places this genus in Ericales, and no genetic study has yet been published
