= Biodiversity of South Africa =

Variety of life within South Africa and its exclusive economic zone

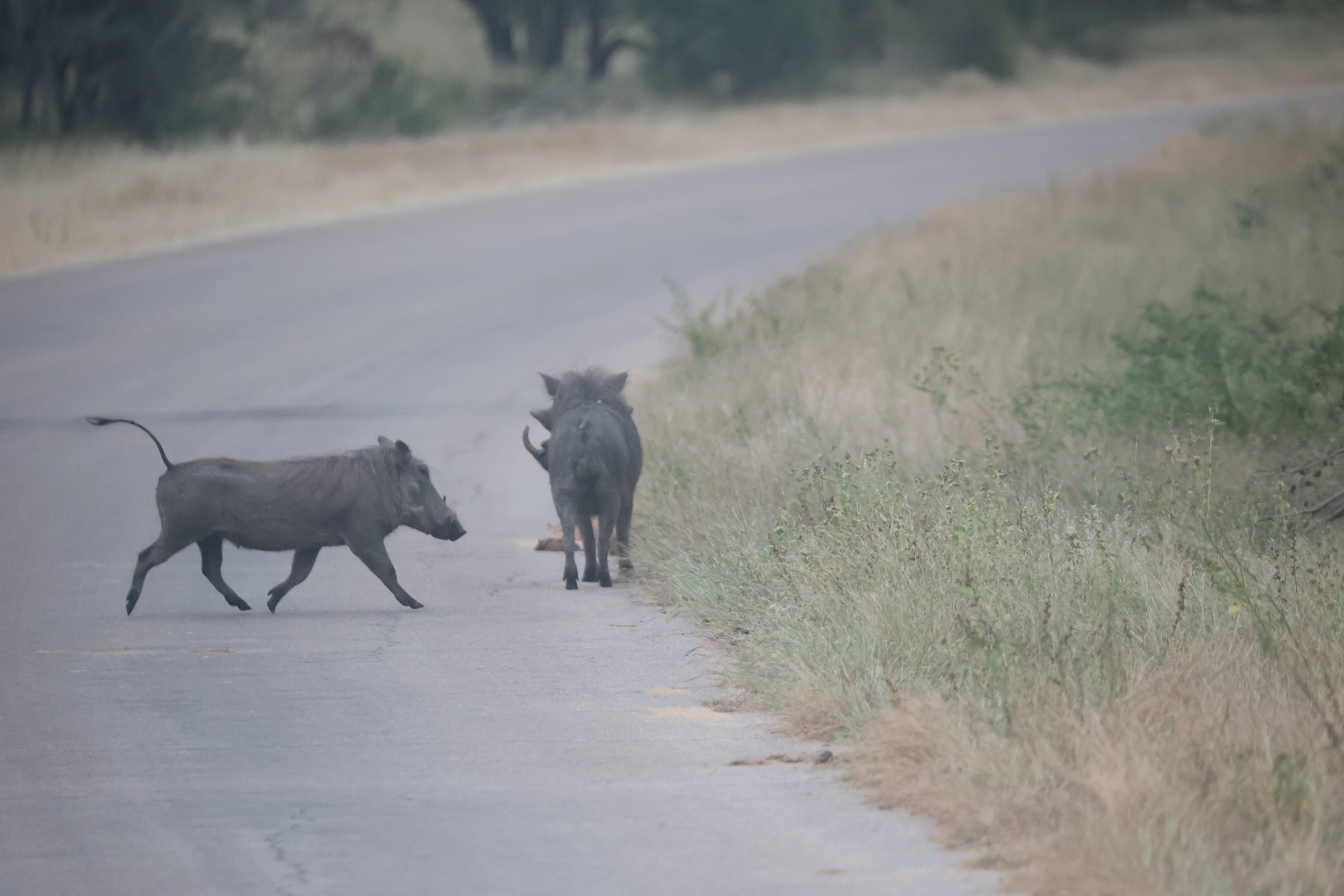
Large mammals such as warthogs contribute to South Africa's biodiversity

The Biodiversity of South Africa refers to the variety of living organisms within the boundaries of South Africa and its exclusive economic zone. South Africa is a region of high biodiversity in the terrestrial and marine realms. The country is ranked sixth out of the world's seventeen megadiverse countries, and is rated among the top 10 for plant species diversity and third for marine endemism.

This biodiversity is monitored and reported in terms of the continental terrestrial, inland aquatic, coastal, marine and the sub-antarctic Prince Edward Islands components. South Africa is a party to the Rio Convention on Biological Diversity, and has declared a number of protected areas, including national parks and marine protected areas which are managed by the national government. Continuing research and periodical reporting on the biodiversity of South Africa is the responsibility of the South African National Biodiversity Institute (SANBI) as directed by the Department of Environment, Forestry and Fisheries, and authorised by various statutory acts.

SANBI reports an estimate of about 67,000 animal species, and more than 20,400 plant species that have been described. Almost a quarter of the global cephalopod species, about 16% of elasmobranch species, 13% of the world's sunspiders (Solifugae), nearly 10% of the world coral species, 8% of seaweeds, 7% of vascular plants, 7% of the birds, 5% of the mammals, nearly 5% of butterflies, 4% of the reptiles, 2% of the amphibians, and 1% of the freshwater fish of the world are found in the country and its exclusive economic zone, including the Prince Edward Islands. Almost two thirds of South Africa's plant species, about half of the species of reptiles, amphibians, butterflies and freshwater fish, and about 40% of the estimated 10,000 marine animal species are endemic.

== Global context ==
Biodiversity is the variety and variability of life on Earth. It is typically a measure of variation at the genetic, species, and ecosystem level. and is not distributed evenly, generally being richest in the tropics. Marine biodiversity is usually highest along coasts in the Western Pacific, where sea surface temperature is highest, and in the mid-latitudinal band in all oceans. Biodiversity generally tends to cluster in hotspots, and has been increasing through time, but will be likely to slow in the future.

Estimates on the number of Earth's current species range from 10 million to 14 million, of which about 1.2 million have been documented and over 86 percent have not yet been described. More recently, in May 2016, scientists reported that 1 trillion species are estimated to be on Earth currently with only one-thousandth of one percent described.

The country is ranked sixth out of the world's seventeen megadiverse countries, with high levels of marine and terrestrial biodiversity. The main criterion for megadiverse countries is endemism at the level of species, genera and families. A megadiverse country must have at least 5,000 species of endemic plants and must border marine ecosystems.

South Africa is one of the smaller megadiverse countries, with a terrestrial area of about 1.2 million km^{2} and is rated among the top 10 for plant species diversity. The EEZ is about 1.1 million km^{2} and is rated third for marine endemism.

=== Measuring diversity ===
Biodiversity is usually plotted as the richness of a geographic area, with some reference to a temporal scale. Types of biodiversity include taxonomic or species, ecological, morphological, and genetic diversity. Taxonomic diversity, that is the number of species, genera, or families, is the most commonly assessed type.

The estimated number of South African animal species as of 2018 is about 67 000, with 20 401 plant species described. This comprises about 7% of the world's vascular plants, 7% of birds, 5% of mammals, 4% of reptiles, 2% of amphibians and 1% of freshwater fishes. Less information is available on invertebrate groups, but South Africa has almost a quarter of global cephalopods, and some terrestrial invertebrate groups are very strongly represented.

== Evolutionary history ==
The age of the Earth is about 4.54 billion years. The earliest undisputed evidence of life on Earth dates at least from 3.5 billion years ago, during the Eoarchean Era after a geological crust started to solidify following the earlier molten Hadean Eon. There are microbial mat fossils found in 3.48 billion-year-old sandstone discovered in Western Australia. Other early physical evidence of a biogenic substance is graphite in 3.7 billion-year-old meta-sedimentary rocks discovered in Western Greenland. More recently, in 2015, "remains of biotic life" were found in 4.1 billion-year-old rocks in Western Australia.

Since life began on Earth, five major mass extinctions and several minor events have led to large and sudden drops in biodiversity. The Phanerozoic eon (the last 540 million years) marked a rapid growth in biodiversity via the Cambrian explosion—a period during which the majority of multicellular phyla first appeared. The next 400 million years included repeated, massive, biodiversity losses classified as mass extinction events. In the Carboniferous, rainforest collapse led to a great loss of plant and animal life. The Permian–Triassic extinction event, 251 million years ago, was the worst; vertebrate recovery took 30 million years. The most recent, the Cretaceous–Paleogene extinction event, occurred 65 million years ago and has often attracted more attention than others because it resulted in the extinction of the non-avian dinosaurs.

The period since the emergence of humans has displayed an ongoing biodiversity reduction and an accompanying loss of genetic diversity. Named the Holocene extinction, the reduction is caused primarily by human impacts, particularly habitat destruction. Conversely, biodiversity positively impacts human health in a number of ways, although a few negative effects are studied.

Taxonomic biodiversity of a region may increase either by influx of species from other regions or by speciation within the region. The former is facilitated by physical connections to other regions of compatible habitability, by the mobility of the affected organisms at some stage of their life cycle, and by agents contributing to dispersal. Speciation in situ is facilitated by reproductive isolation and changes in the environmental pressures on the local populations. Many regions of high biodiversity or endemism arise from habitats which require unusual adaptations.

== Biological realms ==
=== Terrestrial (continental) ===
The Afrotropical realm, marked in blue

The continental terrestrial component of the region lies within the Afrotropical biogeographic realm, which is one of Earth's eight biogeographic realms. It includes Africa south of the Sahara Desert, the majority of the Arabian Peninsula, the island of Madagascar, southern Iran and extreme southwestern Pakistan, and the islands of the western Indian Ocean.

=== Marine ===
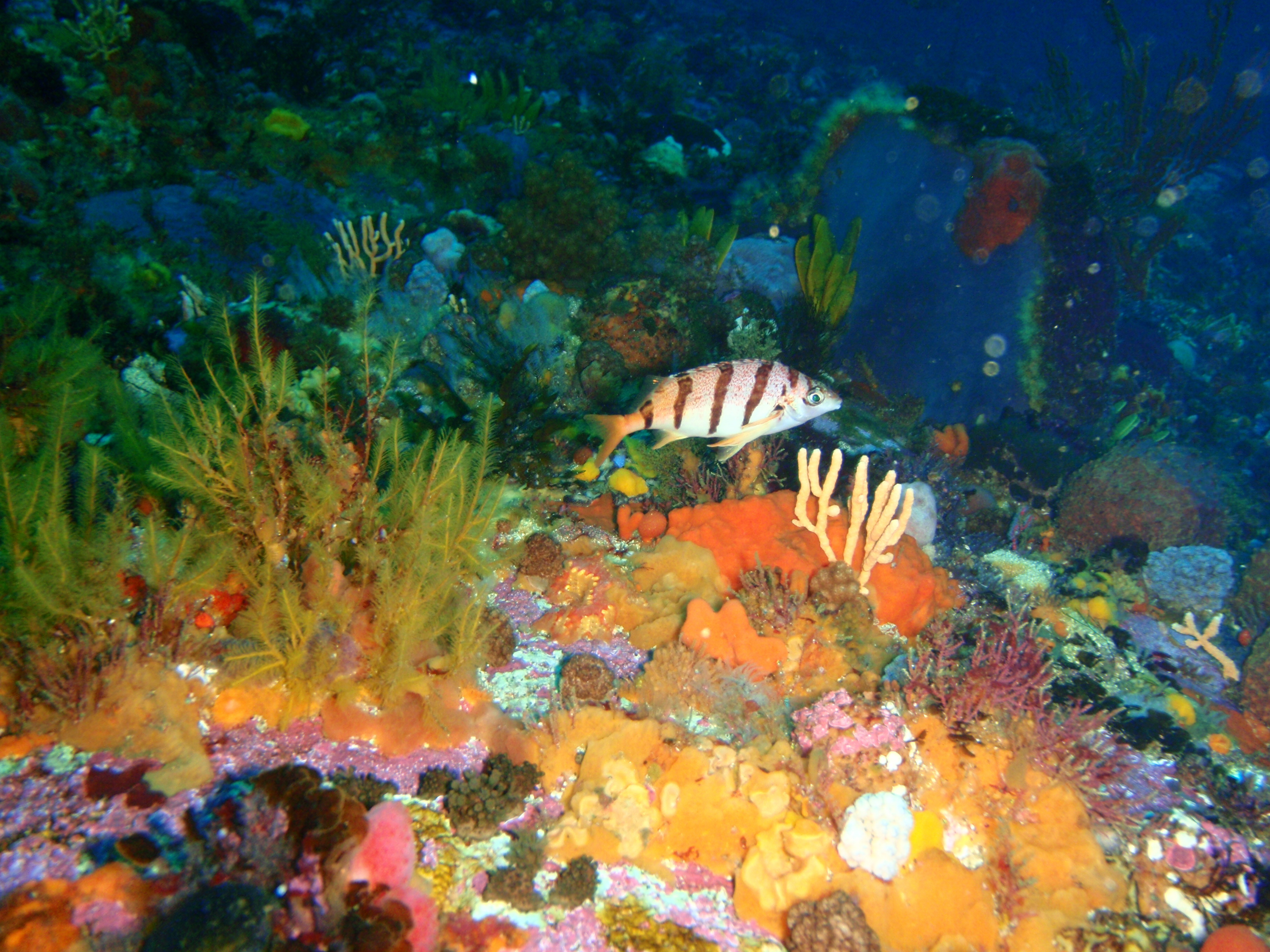
Barred fingerfin at Rocky bank

According to the WWF scheme, the coastal waters of continental South Africa mostly lie within the marine realm of Temperate Southern Africa, with a part in the Western Indo-Pacific. The boundary between the Temperate Southern Africa and Western Indo-Pacific marine realms is near Lake St. Lucia, in northern KwaZulu-Natal, near the border with Mozambique.

The marine biodiversity of South Africa is the variety of living organisms that live in the seas off the coast of South Africa. It includes genetic, species and ecosystems biodiversity in a range of habitats spread over a range of ecologically varied regions, influenced by the geomorphology of the seabed and circulation of major and local water masses, which distribute both living organisms and nutrients in complex and time-variable patterns.

South Africa has a wide range of marine diversity with coastline in three oceans, two major current systems, major ocean frontal systems and benthic topography extending to a maximum depth of 5 700 m. There are 179 defined marine ecosystem types, 150 of them around South Africa and 29 around the sub-Antarctic territory of the Prince Edward Islands.

=== Coastal ===
Since 2018 the National Biodiversity Assessment has produced a separate coastal report, combining data from marine portions of the coastal zone with estuaries and dunes along with beaches and rocky shores, defining the coastal zone as an ecologically determined cross-realm zone spanning the coastal parts of the marine and terrestrial realms, and including all estuaries, within which relevant results from the constituent realms are presented together. This analyses biodiversity across the land-sea interface compares it with the non-coastal parts of the terrestrial and marine realms.

Vegetation types on the landward side of the coastal zone are included in the ecologically defined coast if they are purely coastal or have a coastal affinity, and least 70% of their area is within 10 km of the shore. On the seaward side, ecosystem types that are influenced by the land are considered to be coastal, and include ecosystems extending as far offshore as the back of the inner shelf, bays, and marine ecosystem types influenced by rivers. Estuarine Functional Zones (EFZs) are also considered to be part of the coast.

The ecologically defined coastal zone is estimated to comprise about 4% of mainland terrestrial area, but includes 186 of the 987 ecosystem types, high biodiversity, and many endemic species, particularly along the south coast. This is largely due to large variations in coastal conditions affected by the warm Agulhas Current on the east coast, and cool Benguela Current along the west coast, distinct variations in temperature and rainfall patterns and variations in geology.

Coastal parts of ecosystems tend to be hotspots of cumulative pressure, which often causes poor ecological condition in those areas. Ports and harbours have been identified as centres of cumulative impacts and ecological degradation. Intensive pressures on coastal areas include use of biological resources, coastal development, and mining. Coastal species of economic value which are accessible are likely to be over-exploited. Estuaries are often subjected to major flow modification due to upstream water use, which has adverse impacts on many coastal ecosystem types. For example, sand supplies to beaches and dunes are severely reduced, which affects erosion rates. Climate change and invasive species increase pressures on coastal biodiversity, and much of the pressure due to pollution is poorly understood.

60% of coastal ecosystem types making up 55% of the coastal zone area, have been identified to be threatened, with a high risk of biodiversity loss in 13 ecosystems, while 9% of the coastal zone area is protected, providing good protection to about 24% of coastal ecosystem types.

The three South African regions of high plant diversity and endemism all occur partly along the coast. They are the Maputaland-Pondoland-Albany Hotspot, the Succulent Karoo Region, and the Cape Floristic Region.

The coastal zone provides a rich variety of organisms useful to people as food, medicine, fuel and raw materials for construction and crafts. There are more than 220 coastal plant species recorded as useful for these purposes from South Africa.

Many coastal inhabitants rely to some extent on estuarine and marine fish and invertebrates as part of their diet, and the money saved by harvesting natural resources can be used for other needs, which is a significant benefit for economically marginal families. About a million people engage in recreational fishing, and the fishery is estimated to have a value of about R1.6 billion in 2018.

Some 147 communities and 29000 people are involved in subsistence fishing, harvesting fish, rock lobster, abalone, bait organisms and other intertidal resources, to an estimated value of about R16 million in 2018, about 85% of which is linefishing. The major importance of this sector is in employment and food security of poor coastal communities.

=== Sub-Antarctic ===
The Prince Edward Islands are Marion Island and Prince Edward Island, two small islands in the subantarctic Indian Ocean that are part of South Africa. The islands have been declared Special Nature Reserves under the South African Environmental Management: Protected Areas Act, No. 57 of 2003, and activities on the islands are therefore restricted to research and conservation management. Further protection was granted when the area was declared a marine protected area in 2013. The only human inhabitants of the islands are the staff of a meteorological and biological research station run by the South African National Antarctic Programme on Marion Island.

== Ecoregions ==
An ecoregion (ecological region) is an ecologically and geographically defined area that is smaller than a bioregion, which in turn is smaller than a biogeographic realm. Ecoregions cover relatively large areas of land or water, and contain characteristic, geographically distinct assemblages of natural communities and species. The biodiversity of flora, fauna and ecosystems that characterise an ecoregion tends to be distinct from that of other ecoregions. In theory, biodiversity or conservation ecoregions are relatively large areas of land or water where the probability of encountering different species and communities at any given point remains relatively constant, within an acceptable range of variation. An ecoregion will typically include several habitat types.

=== Terrestrial ecoregions ===
Terrestrial ecoregions are land ecoregions, as distinct from freshwater and marine ecoregions. The WWF divides the land surface of the Earth into eight biogeographical realms containing 867 smaller terrestrial ecoregions.

The eight realms follow the major floral and faunal boundaries, identified by botanists and zoologists, that separate the world's major plant and animal communities. Realm boundaries generally follow continental boundaries, or major barriers to plant and animal distribution, like the Himalayas and the Sahara.

Ecoregions are classified by biome type, which are the major global plant communities determined by rainfall and climate. Forests, grasslands (including savanna and shrubland), and deserts (including xeric shrublands) are distinguished by climate (tropical and subtropical vs. temperate and boreal climates) and, for forests, by whether the trees are predominantly conifers (gymnosperms), broadleaf (Angiosperms), or mixed (broadleaf and conifer). Biome types like Mediterranean forests, woodlands, and scrub; tundra; and mangroves host very distinct ecological communities, and are also recognized as distinct biome types.

Listed by biome:

Tropical and subtropical moist broadleaf forests;

- Knysna-Amatole montane forests – Ecoregion in South Africa
- KwaZulu-Cape coastal forest mosaic – Subtropical moist broadleaf forest ecoregion of South Africa
- Maputaland coastal forest mosaic – Subtropical moist broadleaf forest ecoregion on the east coast of southern Africa
- Southern Zanzibar-Inhambane coastal forest mosaic – Tropical moist broadleaf forest ecoregion of eastern Africa

Tropical and subtropical grasslands, savannas, and shrublands;

- Kalahari Acacia-Baikiaea woodlands – Ecoregion in Botswana, Namibia, South Africa and Zimbabwe
- Southern Africa bushveld – Sub-tropical woodland ecoregion of Southern Africa
- Zambezian and mopane woodlands – Tropical and subtropical ecoregion of southeastern Africa

Montane grasslands and shrublands;

- Drakensberg alti-montane grasslands and woodlands – High altitude ecoregion in South Africa
- Drakensberg montane grasslands, woodlands and forests – Mountain range in South Africa
- Highveld grasslands – Geographic region of the South African inland plateau
- Maputaland-Pondoland bushland and thickets – Montane shrubland ecoregion in South Africa

Mediterranean forests, woodlands, and scrub;

- Albany thickets – Afrotropic terrestrial ecoregion of dense woodland in South Africa
- Lowland fynbos and renosterveld – Shrubland and heathland ecoregion of southwestern South Africa
- Montane fynbos and renosterveld – Shrubland and heathland ecoregion of southwestern South Africa

Deserts and xeric shrublands;

- Kalahari xeric savanna – Semi-arid sandy savanna ecoregion in Southern Africa
- Nama Karoo – Xeric shrubland ecoregion on the central plateau of South Africa and Namibia
- Succulent Karoo – Desert ecoregion of South Africa and Namibia

Tundra;

- Southern Indian Ocean Islands tundra – Ecoregion of several subantarctic islands in the southern Indian Ocean

Mangroves;

- Southern Africa mangroves – Ecoregion in Mozambique and South Africa

=== Marine ecoregions ===
Marine ecoregions of the South African Exclusive Economic Zone (redefined 2011)

The marine ecoregions of the South African exclusive economic zone are a set of geographically delineated regions of similar ecological characteristics on a fairly broad scale, covering the exclusive economic zone along the South African coast. There were originally five inshore bioregions over the continental shelf and four offshore bioregions covering the continental slope and abyssal regions. These bioregions are used for conservation research and planning. They were defined in the South African National Spatial Biodiversity Assessment of 2004. The South African National Spatial Biodiversity Assessment of 2011 amended this to reduce the number of regions to four inshore and two offshore and rename them as ecoregions.

Inshore ecoregions:

- The Benguela ecoregion comprises the consolidated Namaqua and South-western Cape bioregions. which lie between Sylvia Hill in Namibia and Cape Point The northern sector is a cool temperate region from Namibi to Cape Columbine, with large-scale intensive upwelling and nutrient rich water, and the cold Benguela current. The region is known for low oxygen events and it contains extensive mud banks and a relatively wide continental shelf.

The southern sector has a relatively narrow continental shelf and a change in geology at Cape Columbine which marks the northern extent of exposed granite, and there is less offshore mud habitat south of this break. This region includes the two underwater canyons, Cape Point Valley and Cape Canyon, and there are large areas of rocky reef. The change in biology at Cape Columbine is indicated by changes in seaweed and intertidal communities. There is less tendency for oxygen deficient bottom water than in the area further north. The break at the south-eastern end of the region is at Cape Point, where it is distinct in the inshore and tidal habitats, but the change in deeper water tends obliquely to the south-east, and is more diffuse, due to mixing of the Benguela and Agulhas currents between these regions.

- The Agulhas ecoregion extends over the continental shelf from Cape Point to the Mbashe river. The south coast comprises a warm temperate component from Mbashe to Cape Agulhas, and a large overlap zone between Cape Agulhas and Cape Point where waters of the two currents mix. The continental shelf is at its widest in this region, extending up to 240 km offshore on the Agulhas Bank. The shelf edge includes areas of extensive slumping. There are several areas of reef on the Agulhas Bank, including the Alphard banks. This region has the highest number of South African endemics, and is a breeding area for many species. It was renamed to Agulhas ecoregion in the 2011 assessment.
- Natal ecoregion – Ecoregion off the coast of South Africa
- Delagoa ecoregion – Ecoregion off the coast of South Africa

Offshore ecoregions:

- Southeast Atlantic ecoregion – Ecoregion off the coast of South Africa
- Southwest Indian ecoregion – Ecoregion off the coast of South Africa

=== Habitat types ===
In ecology, a habitat is the type of natural environment in which a particular species of organism lives. A species's habitat is those places where the species can find food, shelter, protection and mates for reproduction. It is characterized by both physical and biological features. Every organism has certain habitat needs for the conditions in which it will thrive, but some are tolerant of wide variations while others are very specific in their requirements. A habitat is not necessarily a geographical area, it can be the interior of a stem, a rotten log, a rock or a clump of moss; a parasitic organism has as its habitat the body of its host, part of the host's body (such as the digestive tract), or a single cell within the host's body.

Geographic habitat types include polar, temperate, subtropical and tropical. The terrestrial vegetation type may be forest, steppe, grassland, semi-arid or desert. Fresh-water habitats include marshes, streams, rivers, lakes, and ponds; marine habitats include salt marshes, the coast, the intertidal zone, estuaries, reefs, bays, the open sea, the sea bed, deep water and submarine vents.

Habitats may change over time. Causes of change may include a violent event, or change may occur more gradually over millennia with alterations in the climate. Other changes come as a direct result of human activities. The introduction of alien species can have a devastating effect on native wildlife, through increased predation, competition for resources or the introduction of pests and diseases to which the indigenous species have no immunity. A change to a habitat can have far reaching consequences. It can make it more habitable for some inhabitants, at the expense of others. It can open new niches to immigrants, induce speciation, drive out established communities, and in some cases may lead to extinctions at various scales. A habitat is also directly and indirectly affected by the inhabitant organisms, their presence and biological activity influences the environment in complex ways.

==== Marine habitat types ====
A total of 136 marine habitat types have been identified. The classification takes connectivity, depth and slope, substrate geology and sediment grain size, shoreline wave exposure, and biogeography into account. Beach state considers the wave exposure and grain size. These habitats include 37 coastal types, 17 inshore types in the 5 to 30 m depth range, 62 offshore benthic types deeper than 30 m, and 16 offshore pelagic types, three types of island and one type of lagoon.

== Vegetation types ==
Vegetation types of South Africa.

The diverse vegetation types of South Africa are sampled, classified, described, and mapped by the SANBI VEGMAP project. Vegetation types of Lesotho and Eswatini are included in the project. The vegetation map is useful for biodiversity assessment, research, conservation management and environmental planning, and includes a database. The project is ongoing as more data becomes available over time. The first map was published in 2006, and has been updated in 2009. 2012 and 2018.

The classification system uses a hierarchy to organise the vegetation types within the nine defined biomes and a tenth azonal group. Bioregions are described within the biomes, and the vegetation types are at the more detailed level, and represent groups of communities with similar biotic and abiotic features. The vegetation types are plotted on the map in as much resolution as is available using a GIS system.

Listed by biome, there are 88 Savanna vegetation types, code SV; 73 Grassveld vegetation types, code G; 81 Fynbos vegetation types, code FF; 29 Renosterveld vegetation types, code FR; 65 Succulent Karoo vegetation types, code SK; 54 Albany Thicket and Strandveld vegetation types, codes AT and FS; 29 Nama Karoo and desert vegetation types, codes NK and D; 35 Azonal vegetation types, cose AZ; 17 Forest and coastal belt vegetation types, codes FO and CB; and 8 Subantarctic vegetation types, code ST.

== Endemism ==
Endemism is the ecological state of a species being native to a single defined geographic location, such as an island, nation, country or other defined zone, or habitat type; organisms that are indigenous to a place are not endemic to it if they are also found elsewhere. The extreme opposite of an endemic species is one with a cosmopolitan distribution, having a global or widespread range, and the opposite to an indigenous species in an introduced or invasive species.

=== Terrestrial ===
The Cape Floristic Region, the smallest of the six recognised floral kingdoms of the world, is an area of high diversity and endemism, and is home to over 9,000 vascular plant species, of which 69 percent are endemic. Much of this diversity is associated with the fynbos biome, a Mediterranean-type, fire-prone shrubland.

Several species are endemic to extremely limited habitats, and are under severe pressure due to habitat reduction and degradation.

=== Marine ===
Over 13000 species of marine organisms are recorded from South African waters. Endemism is estimated at between 26 and 33%, the third highest marine endemism after New Zealand (51%) and Antarctica (45%). This varies between taxonomic groups from no endemic marine mammals or birds, to over 90% of chitons.

The region of highest known endemism is the south coast Agulhas inshore ecoregion, which is relatively far from the national borders, and relatively isolated from large scale oceanic circulation due to the effects of the widening of the continental shelf at the Agulhas Bank on the path of the Agulhas current, and far from other warm temperate regions. This region is largely bypassed by the Agulhas current, and has cooler inshore water due to upwelling, making it less hospitable to tropical Indo-west Pacific species. It is also isolated from the South Atlantic and Southern Ocean, so has been more prone to niche speciation.

== Centres of diversity ==
The flora are not evenly distributed over South Africa, they tend to be concentrated in centres of diversity, which are regions of relatively high local biodiversity in a global or national context.

- Succulent Karoo - the arid area to the north and west of the Cape fynbos.
- Cape Floristic Region -
- Griqualand West Centre - the arid area roughly between Prieska, Vryburg, Vorstershoop and Upington in the Northern Cape Province. The vegetation is mainly a variety of bushveld, grassland and Karoo types.
- Albany Centre - in the Eastern Cape from the Kei River to about Middelburg, Aberdeen and the Baviaanskloof Mountains, with a transitional climate between the winter-rainfall of the Western Cape and the summer-rainfall of eastern southern Africa, with a large variety of vegetation types.
- Drakensberg Alpine Centre - the highest altitude mountain region of southern Africa including most of Lesotho, the mountainous area around Barkly East in the Eastern Cape, and the eastern slopes of the Drakensberg through the Eastern Cape, KwaZulu-Natal, and the Free State southwest of Harrismith. Van Rooy (2000) considers this to be one of the main centres of diversity of mosses in southern Africa.
- Soutpansberg Centre - the mountains from the Blouberg in the west, along the Soutpansberg, separating the Limpopo valley from the rest of South Africa, and parts of the Limpopo valley into the north-western corner of the Kruger National Park.
- Wolkberg Centre - the escarpment areas previously known as the Transvaal Drakensberg, between Carolina, Mpumalanga, in the south to Haenertsburg, Limpopo Province in the north, and west to Zebediela.
- Sekhukhuneland Centre - a drier area inland of the escarpment of the Wolkberg Centre, on basic and ultramafic rocks of the Bushveld Igneous Complex.
- Barberton Centre - the mountains between Barberton in Mpumalanga Province, and the border with Eswatini.
- Maputaland-Pondoland Region - most of KwaZulu-Natal, with the edges extending into neighbouring areas, particularly southern Mozambique and the Eastern Cape. The area contains various grassland, thicket and forest types.

== Genetic diversity ==
Genetic diversity is the amount of variation in the Deoxyribonucleic acid (DNA) of distinct individuals, representing the genetic characteristics of a species. From a conservation perspective, genetic diversity appears to be highly variable in populations and species.

Genetic diversity is important for evolutionary potential, as it serves as a way for populations to adapt to changing environments. With more variation, it is more likely that some individuals in a population will possess variations of alleles that are suited for the new environment. Those individuals are more likely to survive to produce offspring bearing that allele. The population will continue for more generations because of the success of these individuals.

The methods of measuring genetic diversity of a region include:

- Species richness, a measure of the number of species,
- Species abundance, a relative measure of the abundance of species,
- Species density, an evaluation of the total number of species per unit area

Stochastic simulation software can be used to predict the future of a population given measurements such as allele frequency and population size.

== Hotspots ==
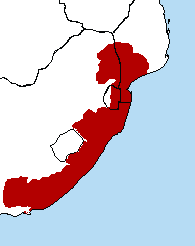
Maputaland-Pondoland-Albany Hotspot

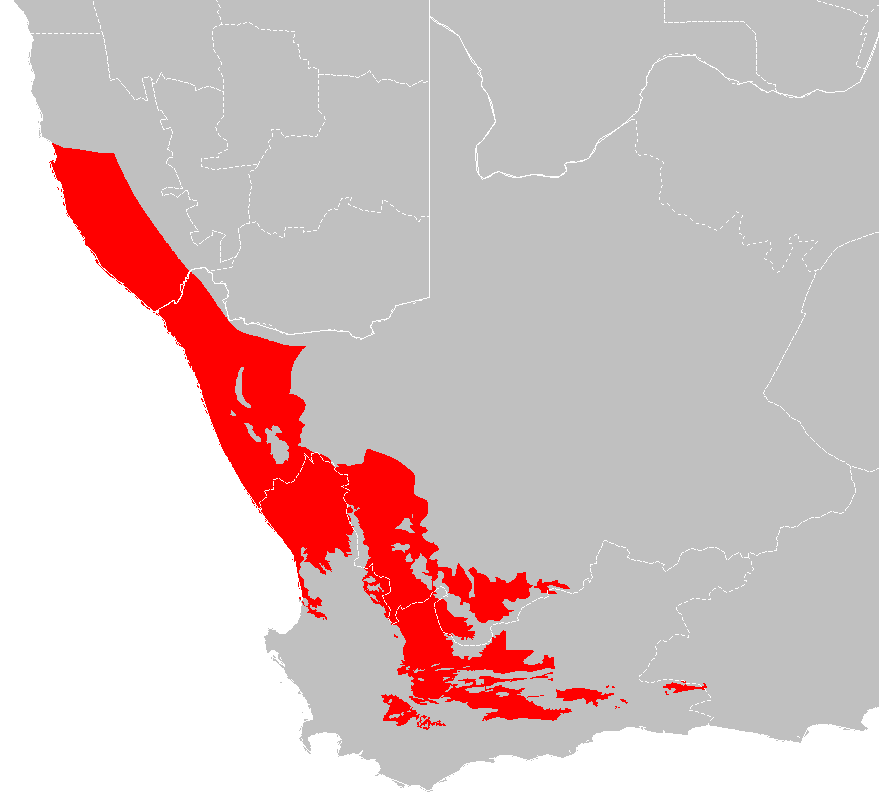
Succulent Karroo location map

A biodiversity hotspot is a biogeographic region with significant levels of biodiversity that is threatened by human habitation. Around the world, 36 areas qualify under this definition. These sites support nearly 60% of the world's plant, bird, mammal, reptile, and amphibian species, with a very high proportion of those species as endemics. Some of these hotspots support as many as 15,000 endemic plant species and some have lost up to 95% of their natural habitat. Biodiversity hotspots support their diverse ecosystems on just 2.4% of the planet's surface, but the area defined as hotspots covers a much larger proportion of the land, at about 15.7% of the land surface area, where they have lost around 85% of their original habitat.

Three of these hotspots are largely or entirely within South Africa:

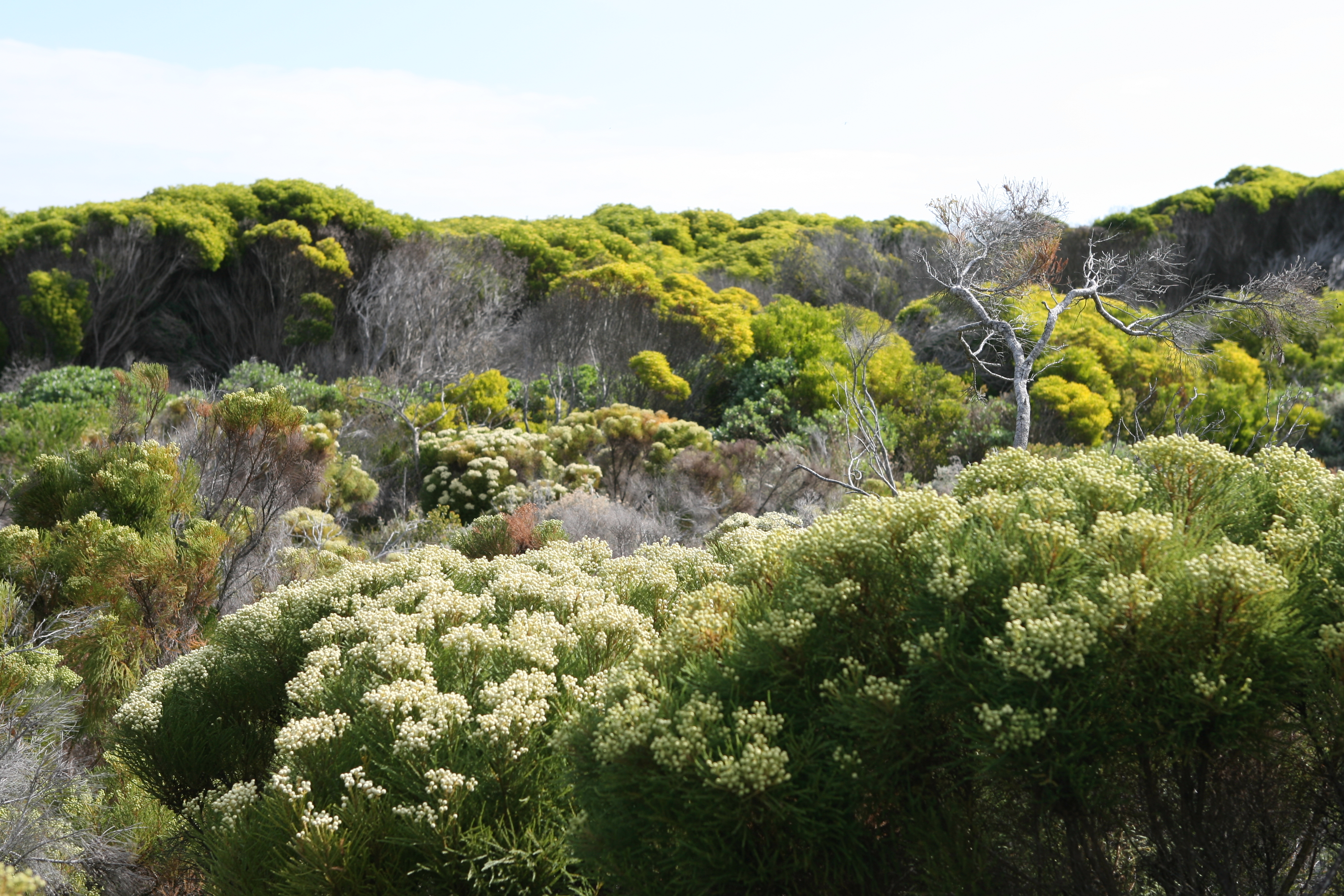
Fynbos in the Western Cape

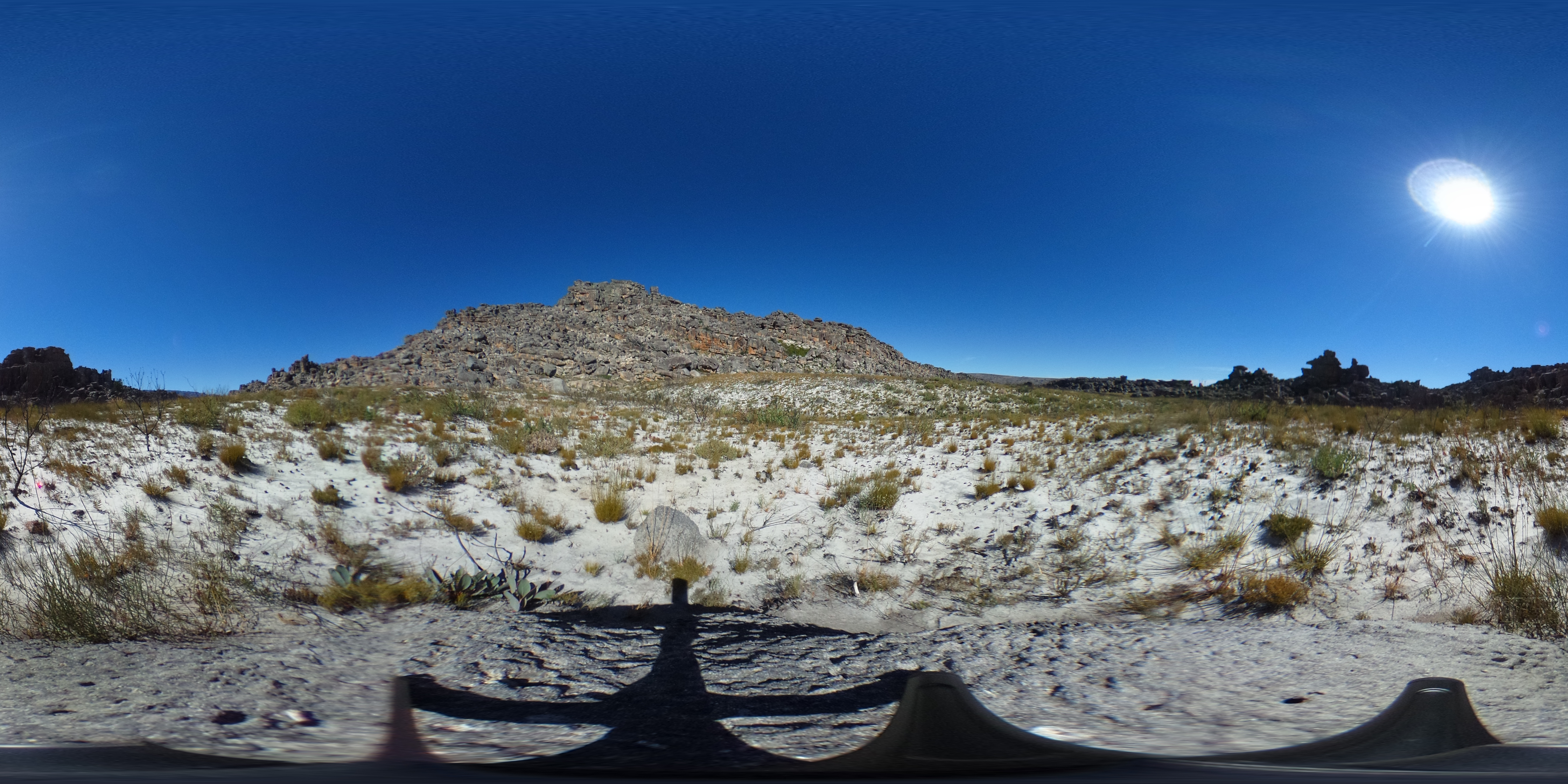
A 360 degree photograph of fynbos in the Groot Winterhoek region of the Western Cape about 18 months after a fire. New plants can be seen in various stages of growth following the fire. The infertile white soil that fynbos tends to grow in can also be clearly seen. Click here to see the photograph in 360 degrees.

The Cape Floristic Region is the smallest of the six recognised floral kingdoms of the world, is an area of extraordinarily high diversity and endemism, and is home to over 9,000 vascular plant species, of which 69 percent are endemic. Much of this diversity is associated with the fynbos biome, a Mediterranean-type, fire-prone shrubland. The economical worth of fynbos biodiversity, based on harvests of fynbos products (e.g. wildflowers) and eco-tourism, is estimated to be in the region of R77 million a year. Thus, it is clear that the Cape Floristic Region has both economic and intrinsic biological value as a biodiversity hotspot.

The Maputaland-Pondoland-Albany Hotspot is situated near the south-eastern coast of Africa, occupying an area between the Great Escarpment and the Indian Ocean. The area is named after Maputaland, Pondoland and Albany. It stretches from the Albany Centre of Plant Endemism in the Eastern Cape Province of South Africa, through the Pondoland Centre of Plant Endemism and KwaZulu-Natal Province, the eastern side of Eswatini (known as Swaziland until 2018) and into southern Mozambique and Mpumalanga. The Maputaland Centre of Plant Endemism is contained in northern KwaZulu-Natal and southern Mozambique.

The Succulent Karoo lies along the coastal strip of southwestern Namibia and South Africa's Northern Cape Province, where the cold Benguela Current offshore creates frequent fogs. The ecoregion extends inland into the uplands of South Africa's Western Cape Province. It is bounded on the south by the Mediterranean climate fynbos, on the east by the Nama Karoo, which has more extreme temperatures and variable rainfall, and on the north by the Namib Desert.

== Species lists ==
A simple measure of taxonomic biodiversity is the count or listing of taxa found within a region. This may be recorded as species checklists. Since the number of species may be large, a checklist may be split into lists of species in a specified taxon at whatever level is convenient. For some taxa, a list by phylum is manageable, for others lists may be broken down to family level. Within the lists, the detail is generally at species level, but may vary depending on the available information, and a utilitarian approach is used, providing available detail that appears useful and reliable. A taxon may be labelled to indicate that it is endemic, indigenous, introduced, cultivated, or invasive.

=== Flora ===
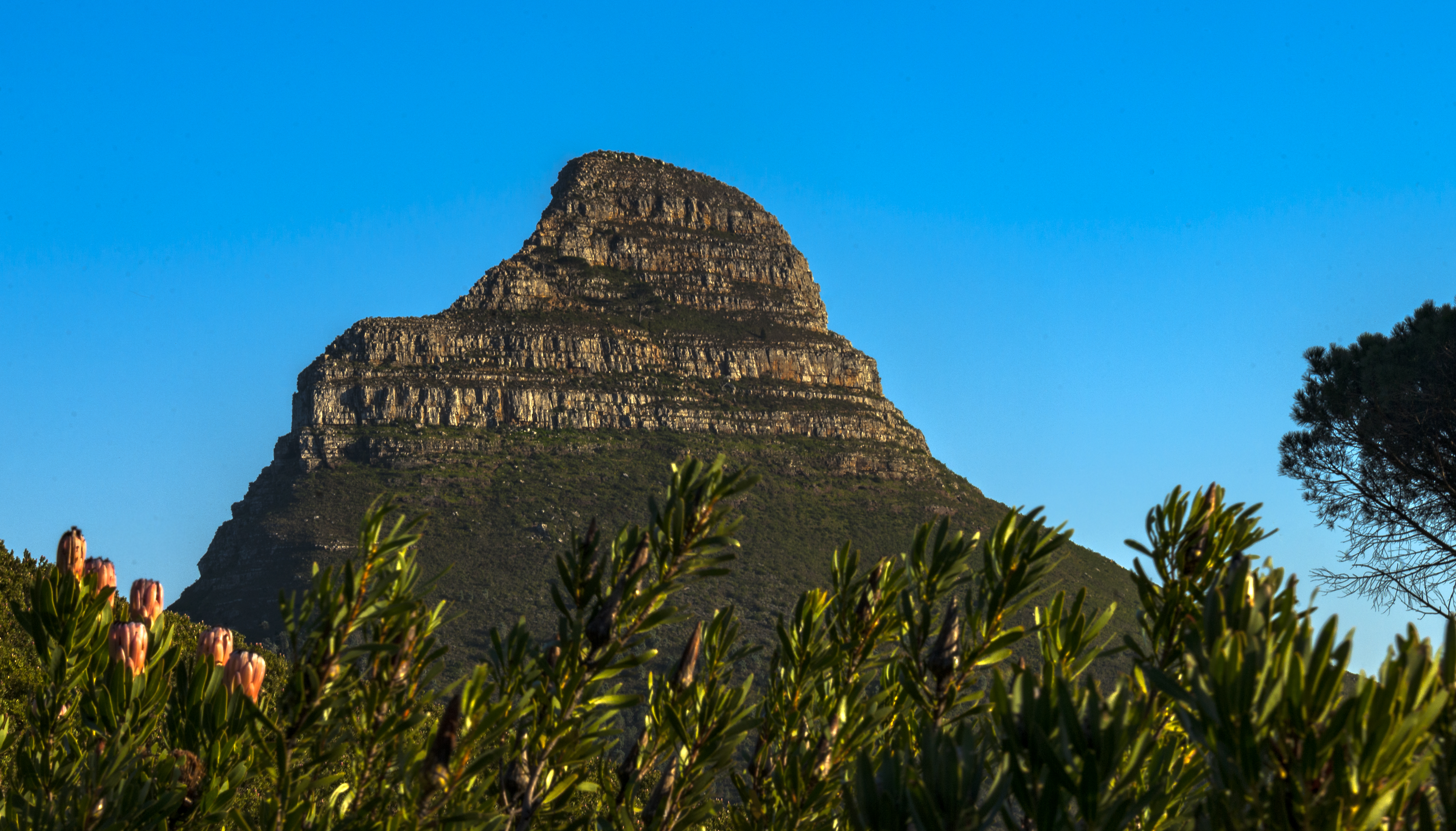
Protea cynaroides on Table Mountain

23,420 species of vascular plant have been recorded in South Africa, making it the sixth most species-rich country in the world and the most species-rich country on the African continent. Of these, 153 species are considered to be threatened. Nine biomes have been described in South Africa: Fynbos, Succulent Karoo, desert, Nama Karoo, grassland, savanna, Albany thickets, the Indian Ocean coastal belt, and forests.

The 2018 National Biodiversity Assessment plant checklist lists 35,130 taxa in the phyla Anthocerotophyta (hornworts (6)), Anthophyta (flowering plants(33534)), Bryophyta (mosses (685)), Cycadophyta (cycads (42)), Lycopodiophyta (Lycophytes(45)), Marchantiophyta (liverworts (376)), Pinophyta (conifers (33)), and Pteridophyta (cryptogams(408)).

- List of conifers of South Africa – Plants of the class Pinophyta recorded from South Africa
- List of cycads of South Africa – Seed producing vascular plants of the division Cycadophyta recorded from South Africa
- Lists of flowering plants of South Africa – List of lists of flowering plants recorded from South Africa
- List of hornworts of South Africa
- List of liverworts of South Africa – Plant listing
- List of lycophytes of South Africa – Spore bearing vascular plants of South Africa
- List of mosses of South Africa – Small, non-vascular flowerless plants recorded from South Africa
- List of pteridophytes of South Africa – Spore-bearing vascular plants recorded from South Africa

=== Fauna ===
- Acanthocephala – Group of parasitic thorny-headed worms – List of Acanthocephala of South Africa
- Annelida – Phylum of segmented worms – List of annelids of South Africa
  - Clitellata – Class of annelids that includes earthworms and leeches
    - Hirudinea – Parasitic or predatory annelid worms
    - Oligochaeta – Subclass of annelids including earthworms
  - Polychaeta – Class of annelid worms
- Arthropoda
  - Arachnida
    - Astigmata, Mesostigmata, Prostigmata, Oribatida
    - Ixodida
    - Amblypygi
    - Araneae
    - Opiliones
    - Palpigradi
    - Pseudoscorpiones
    - Schizomida
    - Scorpiones
    - Solifugae
  - Branchiopoda
    - Anostraca
    - Conchostraca
    - Cladocera
    - Notostraca
  - Chilopoda
  - Diplopoda
  - Collembola
  - Diplura
  - Insecta
    - Archaeognatha
    - Blattodea – Order of insects that includes cockroaches and termites
    - Coleoptera – Order of insects
    - Dermaptera
    - Diptera
    - Embioptera
    - Ephemeroptera
    - Notoptera
    - Hemiptera
    - Hymenoptera – Order of insects
    - Isoptera
    - Lepidoptera – Order of insects including moths and butterflies
      - List of butterflies of South Africa
      - List of moths of South Africa
        - List of moths of South Africa (Arctiinae)
        - List of moths of South Africa (Crambidae)
        - List of moths of South Africa (Gelechiidae)
        - List of moths of South Africa (Geometridae)
        - List of moths of South Africa (Nepticulidae)
        - List of moths of South Africa (Noctuidae)
        - List of moths of South Africa (Pyralidae)
        - List of moths of South Africa (Tortricidae)
    - Mantodea
    - Mecoptera
    - Megaloptera
    - Neuroptera
    - Odonata
    - Orthoptera
    - Phasmida
    - Phthiraptera
    - Plecoptera
    - Psocoptera
    - Siphonaptera
    - Strepsiptera
    - Thysanoptera
    - Trichoptera
    - Zygentoma
  - Malacostraca – List of marine crustaceans of South Africa#Malacostraca
    - Amphipoda
    - Bathynellacea
    - Cumacea
    - Decapoda
    - Euphausiacea
    - Isopoda
    - Leptostraca
    - Mysida
    - Spelaeogriphacea
    - Stomatopoda
    - Tanaidacea
  - Maxillopoda – List of marine crustaceans of South Africa#Maxillopoda
    - Branchiura
    - Copepoda – List of marine crustaceans of South Africa#Copepoda
    - Mystacocarida
    - Pentastomida
    - Thecostraca
  - Ostracoda – List of marine crustaceans of South Africa#Ostracoda
  - Pauropoda
  - Pycnogonida – List of sea spiders of South Africa
  - Symphyla
- Brachiopoda
- Bryozoa
- Chaetognatha
- Chordata
  - Actinopterygii – Class of ray-finned bony fishes – List of marine bony fishes of South Africa#Actinopterygii
    - List of marine spiny-finned fishes of South Africa
      - List of marine Perciform fishes of South Africa
        - List of marine fishes of the suborder Percoidei of South Africa
  - Amphibia
  - Appendicularia/Thaliacea
  - Ascidiacea
  - Aves – List of birds of South Africa
  - Cephalochordata
  - Chondrichthyes – List of marine fishes of South Africa#Chondrichtyes
  - Mammalia – List of mammals of South Africa
  - Myxini – List of marine fishes of South Africa#Myxini
  - Reptilia
    - List of lizards of South Africa
  - Sarcopterygii – List of marine bony fishes of South Africa#Gigaclass Sarcopterygii — Lobefin fishes
- Cnidaria – List of marine cnidarians of South Africa
- Ctenophora – List of comb jellies of South Africa
- Cycliophora
- Echinodermata – List of echinoderms of South Africa
- Echiura
- Entoprocta
- Gastrotricha
- Gnathostomulida
- Hemichordata
- Kinorhyncha
- Loricifera
- Micrognathozoa
- Mollusca
  - Aplacophora – List of marine molluscs of South Africa#Aplacophora
  - Bivalvia – List of marine molluscs of South Africa#Bivalvia
  - Cephalopoda – List of marine molluscs of South Africa#Cephalopoda
  - Gastropoda – List of marine gastropods of South Africa
    - List of marine heterobranch gastropods of South Africa
  - Polyplacophora – List of marine molluscs of South Africa#Polyplacophora
  - Scaphopoda – List of marine molluscs of South Africa#Scaphopoda
- Myxozoa
- Nematoda
- Nematomorpha
- Nemertea
- Onychophora
- Orthonectida
- Phoronida
- Placozoa
- Platyhelminthes
  - Cestoda
  - Monogenea
  - Trematoda
  - Turbellaria
- Porifera – List of sponges of South Africa
- Priapulida
- Rhombozoa
- Rotifera
- Sipuncula
- Tardigrada
- Xenacoelomorpha

=== Fungi ===
By 1945, more than 4900 species of fungi (including lichen-forming species) had been recorded, and by 2006, the number of fungi in South Africa was estimated at 200,000 species, without taking into account fungi associated with insects. If correct, then the number of South African fungi dwarfs that of its plants. In at least some major South African ecosystems, an exceptionally high percentage of fungi are highly specific in terms of the plants with which they occur. The country's Biodiversity Strategy and Action Plan does not mention fungi (including lichen-forming fungi).

- Ascomycota
- Basidiomycota
- Zygomycota
- Lichen-forming and lichenicolous fungi
- Oomycete

==== History ====
I. B. Pole-Evans established a national collection of fungi in Pretoria after his appointment in 1905. The previously existing collections of MacOwan and Medley Wood comprised 765 specimens. By 1950 the collection included more than 35 000 fungal specimens. The collections of P.A. van der Bijl and L. Verwoerd were housed at Stellenbosch, and the P. MacOwan collection and Bolus herbarium collections at Cape Town. Several European herbaria, including Kew and the International Mycological Institute also held collections. E. M. Doidge (1950) summarised the content, listing 835 species of Ascomycetes, 1704 Basidiomycetes, 93 Myxomycetes, 77 Phycomycetes, 1159 lichens, and 880 fungi imperfecti, with a total of 4748 species.

=== Other eukaryotes ===
- Seaweed – Macroscopic marine algae
  - Green algae – Paraphyletic group of eukaryotes – List of green seaweeds of South Africa
  - Brown algae – Large group of multicellular algae, comprising the class Phaeophyceae – List of brown seaweeds of South Africa
  - Red algae – Division of plant life – List of red seaweeds of South Africa

== Threats ==
Biodiversity loss is the extinction of species worldwide, and also the local reduction or loss of species in a given habitat. Local losses can be temporary or permanent, depending on whether the environmental degradation that leads to the loss is reversible through ecological restoration or ecological resilience, or effectively permanent. Global extinction has so far been proven to be irreversible.

Even though permanent global species loss is a more dramatic phenomenon than regional changes in species composition, even minor changes from a healthy stable state can have dramatic influence on the food web and the food chain insofar as reductions in only one species can adversely affect the entire chain (coextinction), leading to an overall reduction in biodiversity, possible alternative stable states of an ecosystem notwithstanding. Ecological effects of biodiversity are usually counteracted by its loss. Reduced biodiversity in particular leads to reduced ecosystem services and eventually poses an immediate danger for food security, both within the ecosystem, and for human populations relying on it.

Habitat change by way of habitat fragmentation or habitat destruction) is the most important driver currently affecting biodiversity, as some 40% of forests and ice-free habitats have been converted to cropland or pasture. Other drivers are: overexploitation, pollution, invasive species, and climate change.

=== Human impacts ===
According to a 2019 Global Assessment Report on Biodiversity and Ecosystem Services by IPBES, 25% of plant and animal species are globally threatened with extinction as the result of human activity. As a region with high endemic diversity and three major biodiversity hotspots, South Africa is one of the regions where this is highly significant.

=== Climate change ===
Climate change includes both the global warming driven by human emissions of greenhouse gases, and the resulting large-scale shifts in weather patterns. While there have been previous periods of climatic change, changes observed since the mid-20th century have been unprecedented in rate and scale.

=== Endangered species ===
An endangered species is a species that is very likely to become extinct in the near future, either worldwide or in a particular region. Endangered species may be at risk due to factors such as habitat loss, poaching and invasive species. The International Union for Conservation of Nature (IUCN) Red List lists the global conservation status of many species, and various other agencies assess the status of species within particular areas. Some endangered species are the target of extensive conservation efforts such as captive breeding and habitat restoration.

=== Extinction ===
Rapid environmental changes typically cause mass extinctions. More than 99.9 percent of all species that ever lived on Earth, amounting to over five billion species, are estimated to be extinct.

== Economic value ==
Ways in which the biodiversity of SA has economic value to the inhabitants

- Natural resources
- Employment opportunities
- Tourism industry

The economical worth of fynbos biodiversity, based on harvests of fynbos products (e.g. wildflowers) and eco-tourism, is estimated to be in the region of R77 million a year. Thus, it is clear that the Cape Floristic Region has both economic and intrinsic biological value as a biodiversity hotspot.

== Management ==
South Africa signed the Rio Convention on Biological Diversity on 4 June 1994, and became a party to the convention on 2 November 1995. It has subsequently produced a National Biodiversity Strategy and Action Plan, which was received by the convention on 7 June 2006.

=== Responsibility ===
- Government department - Department of the Environment, Forestry and Fisheries. Previous departments: DEAT etc.
- Laws

=== Sustainable use ===
Ecotourism in South Africa has become more prevalent as a possible method of supporting the maintenance of biodiversity.

== Protection ==
=== Protected areas ===
The protected areas of South Africa include national parks and marine protected areas managed by the national government, public nature reserves managed by provincial and local governments, and private nature reserves managed by private landowners. Most protected areas are intended for the conservation of flora and fauna. National parks are maintained by South African National Parks (SANParks). A number of national parks have been incorporated in transfrontier conservation areas.

== Research ==
=== Research institutions ===
The South African National Biodiversity Institute (SANBI) is an organisation established in 2004 in terms of the National Environmental Management: Biodiversity Act, No 10 of 2004, under the South African Department of Environmental Affairs (later named Department of Environment, Forestry and Fisheries), tasked with research and dissemination of information on biodiversity, and legally mandated to contribute to the management of the country's biodiversity resources.

- Council for Scientific and Industrial Research (CSIR) – South African scientific research and development organisation
- Iziko South African Museum – South African national museum in Cape Town

Marine research:

- South African Association for Marine Biological Research – Non profit conservation research organisation based in Durban, SA
- South African Environmental Observation Network (SAEON) – Long-term ecological research network
- South African Institute for Aquatic Biodiversity (SAIAB) – Centre for the study of aquatic biodiversity in Grahamstown, South Africa

=== National Biodiversity Assessment ===
The National Biodiversity Assessment (NBA) is a recurring project by the South African National Biodiversity Institute in collaboration with the government department currently responsible for environmental affairs and several other organisations to assess the state of South Africa's biodiversity over time as an input for policy and decision making where the environment may be affected. The NBA looks into genetic, species and ecosystems biodiversity for terrestrial, freshwater, estuarine and marine environments. Each assessment cycle nominally takes approximately five years, and both generates new knowledge and analyses existing knowledge. NBA reports are named for the year of the data, and are usually published in the following year. They have been published for 2004, 2011, and 2018, and include reports, data, and supplementary documents.

== See also ==
- Biodiversity – Variety and variability of life forms
