= Maputaland-Pondoland-Albany Hotspot =

Southern Africa biodiversity hotspot

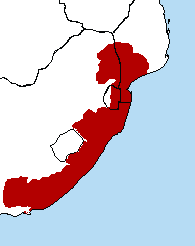
Maputaland-Pondoland-Albany Hotspot

The Maputaland-Pondoland-Albany Hotspot (MPA) is a biodiversity hotspot, a biogeographic region with significant levels of biodiversity, in Southern Africa. It is situated near the south-eastern coast of Africa, occupying an area between the Great Escarpment and the Indian Ocean. The area is named after Maputaland, Pondoland and Albany. It stretches from the Albany Centre of Plant Endemism in the Eastern Cape Province of South Africa, through the Pondoland Centre of Plant Endemism and KwaZulu-Natal Province, the eastern side of Eswatini (known as Swaziland until 2018) and into southern Mozambique and Mpumalanga. The Maputaland Centre of Plant Endemism is contained in northern KwaZulu-Natal and southern Mozambique.

== Geography ==
This ecoregion covers globally all the humid subtropical climate zones of Africa (the latter being located almost exclusively in South Africa), an area of 274,136 km^{2} (105,845 sq mi). It forms a broad coastal strip extending from the extreme south of Mozambique and north-east of Mpumalanga to the east of Eastern Cape Province in South Africa, including the Wild Coast. It also includes eastern Swaziland and borders southern and eastern Lesotho. It consists of three regions more or less biologically close but each with its own characteristics. Maputaland (also known as Tongaland) refers to the southern part of Mozambique, Swaziland and northern KwaZulu-Natal, Pondoland includes central and southern KwaZulu-Natal, and Albany is the eastern part of Eastern Cape.

The terrain in this region is complex, providing a great diversity of landscapes with varied reliefs. It encompasses the southeast of the Great Escarpment and down to the edge of the Indian Ocean. As a result, this ecoregion includes much of the Drakensberg range, especially in the south and centre of the area. One of the best-watered areas in South Africa, a large part of the area receives on average between 750 and 1,000 mm (30 and 39 in) per year and the Kwazulu-Natal coasts as well as parts of the Drakensberg exceed the annual 1,000 mm (39 in). The northern part of the area consists mainly of medium and lowland plains with areas of ancient sand dunes, while the southern part has more rugged terrain with many cliffs cut by multiple streams. Inland, there are several ranges of mountain which include Sneeuberge, Winterberg, Amathole Mountains, Ngeli Range, Lebombo Mountains and Ngoye Range.

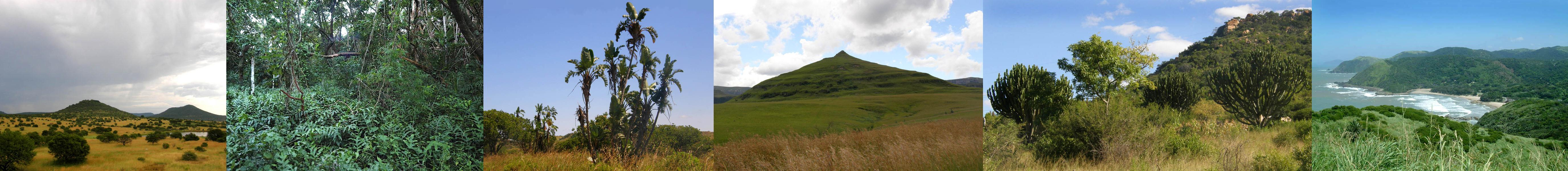
Landscapes of Maputaland-Pondoland-Albany, from left to right: shrubby grassland near Pietermaritzburg; dense forest in KwaZulu-Natal; wooded savanna with Strelitzia nicolai in iSimangaliso Wetland Park; high altitude grassland near Ladysmith; shrubby savanna with tree spurge in the north of Kwazulu-Natal; coastal scrub and forest in Silaka Nature Reserve

== Biodiversity ==
The Maputaland-Pondoland-Albany area supports a very high biodiversity, both animal and plant. With nearly 8100 vascular plants species and 2000 endemic plant species, it is the second richest area in Africa in terms of plant diversity, after the Cape Floristic Region. The Albany region also has a great diversity of succulent plants, notably arborescent plants, differing from the leafy succulent species of the Karoo desert. The vegetation cover is mainly composed of forests, shrubland, bushveld and meadows. About 80% of the remaining forests of South Africa occur in this region, and nearly 600 species of trees are represented here, the highest diversity of any temperate forest in the world. Among the large number of plants in this ecoregion, about 1900 are endemic. There is also an endemic family, that of Rhynchocalycaceae, which has only one species: Rhynchocalyx lawsonioides. Many plants present in this hotspot were subsequently widely used as ornamental or medicinal plants; examples include Strelitzia reginae and nicolai, Clivia miniata, Kniphofia or the extremely rare Sandersonia aurantiaca. Aloe ferox is widely used for its sap with healing properties.

Although the hotspot was originally envisaged as referring to the wide diversity of vascular plant species, the pattern of plant endemism is matched by numerous endemic vertebrates. The degree of endemism among plants in this hotspot is 23.5% whereas the degree of endemism among vertebrates is 5.1% and near-endemism 4.9%. If the area of the hotspot was redefined as the "Greater Maputaland-Pondoland-Albany" area, an increase of 73%, to include the Great Escarpment area, the vertebrate endemism would total 146 species (19 freshwater fishes, 29 amphibians, 75 reptiles, 15 birds and 8 mammals), a figure 135% higher than the 62 vertebrate species for the MPA as presently defined.

Most of the endemic vertebrates in the ecoregion inhabit the forests and grasslands, and many have niche habitat requirements such as rocky outcrops or marshy areas within these larger biomes; the Sloggett's vlei rat and the Natal red rock hare are quite widespread in the area while the woodbush legless skink and the robust golden mole have narrower habitat requirements.

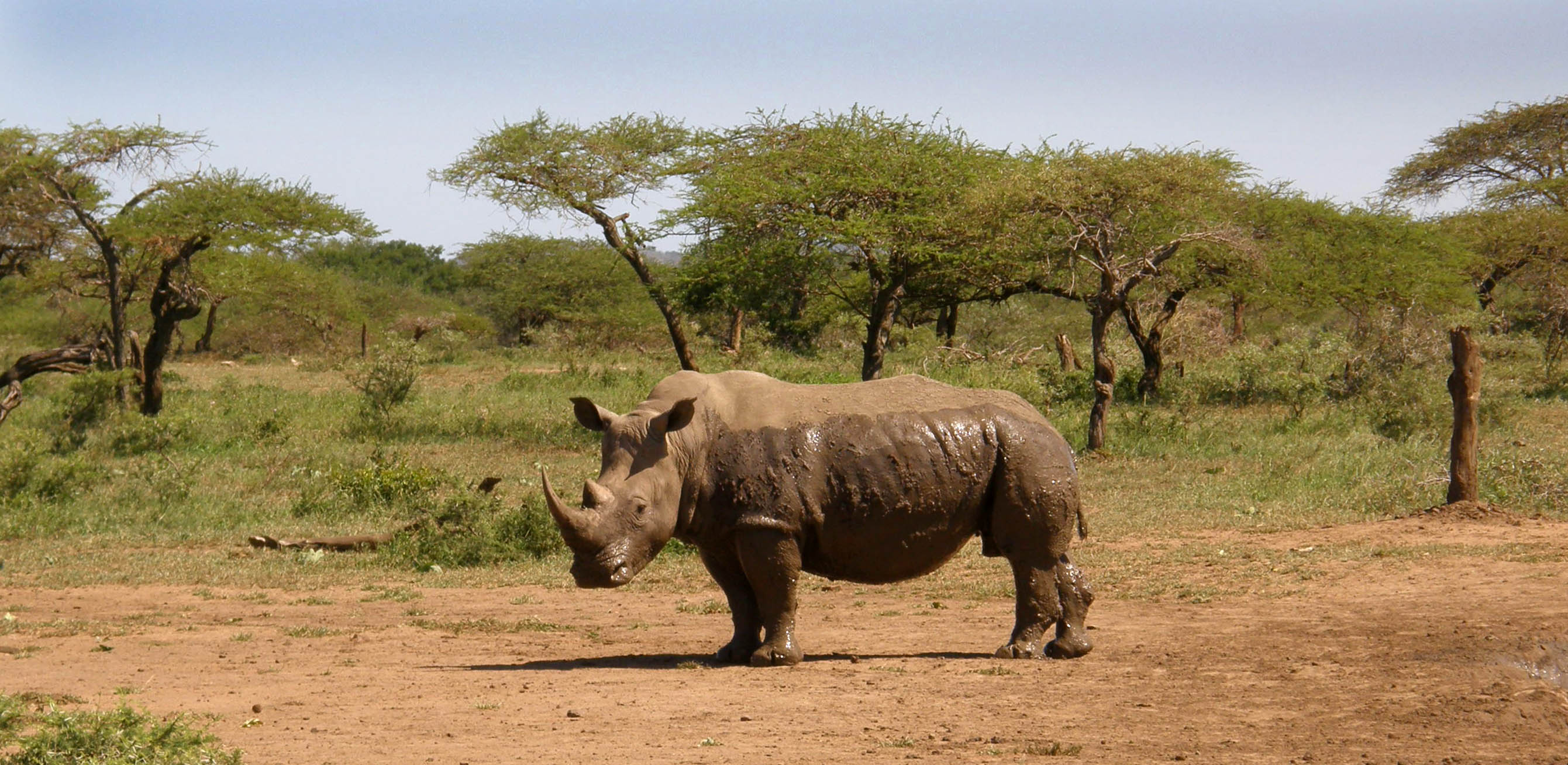
A White Rhino emerging from a mud bath in Hluhluwe-Umfolozi Reserve

Animal diversity is lower, with fairly low endemism. 194 species of mammals are counted there, of which only 4 are endemic: Red bush squirrel (Paraxerus palliates), four-toed elephant shrew (Petrodromus tetradactylus), narrow-headed golden mole (Amblysomus marleyi) and the giant golden mole (Chrysospalax trevelyani). However, there are many notable species: antelopes, felines, primates, rhinos, which are not endemic but very representative of protected areas, particularly in Maputaland. This is particularly the case of the southern subspecies of the White rhinoceros (Ceratotherium simum simum) which was once widely distributed in southern and eastern Africa and which almost disappeared due to the horn trade; yet it is with a dozen individuals placed in the Hluhluwe–Imfolozi Park that the population experienced an extraordinary surge: today it has nearly 12,000 individuals spread over several reserves including outside South Africa. There are also several species of forest antelope such as the Zanzibar Suni (Neotragus moschatus) or the blue duiker (Philantomba monticola).

There are 540 bird species in this hotspot. If none is endemic, it appears that many southern African forest species are present in this region, and that some are almost endemic to this hotspot, such as the Cape parrot for example. Others are found only in this region in South Africa but their distribution extends beyond into the coastal forests of eastern Africa.

Of 209 species of reptiles 30 are endemic. This hotspot is the home of at least 7 species of dwarf chameleons of the genus Bradypodion whose distribution is very small. There is also an endemic genus containing a single species: the Natal black snake (Macrelaps microlepidotus). Other endemic species include the Natal hinge-back tortoise (Kinixys natalensis), a turtle unique to the Lembobo Mountains, the very rare Albany viper (Bitis albanica) confined to Algoa Bay (Eastern Cape), and a species of lizard: the Tasman's cordyle (Cordylus tasmani). There are also 72 species of amphibians, 11 of which are unique to this region, including an endemic monospecific genus including the Boneberg frog (Natalobatrachus bonebergi). There are other endangered species: Hogsback frog (Anhydrophryne rattrayi), Afrixalus spinifrons, Hyperolius pickersgilli, as well as a recently discovered species, Breviceps sopranus, which emits a very high-pitched croak.

Among the other groups of the animal kingdom we can note the 73 species of freshwater fish with 22 endemic. A species of shark, the Paragaleus leucolomatus, is only known from a single specimen caught in Kosi Bay (natural reserve, coord. -26.895129,32.825546) south of Maputo. Among the species of invertebrates we find in particular the very primitive Onychophora, which resemble worms with legs and velvety skin. In the moist forest floors lives a species of giant earthworm (Microchaetus vernoni) that can reach 2.6m in length. There is also a species of flightless dung beetle: Circellium bacchus, whose range is concentrated only in the Addo Elephant National Park (where specific signs indicate that it has priority over vehicles in the thoroughfares) and surrounding areas.

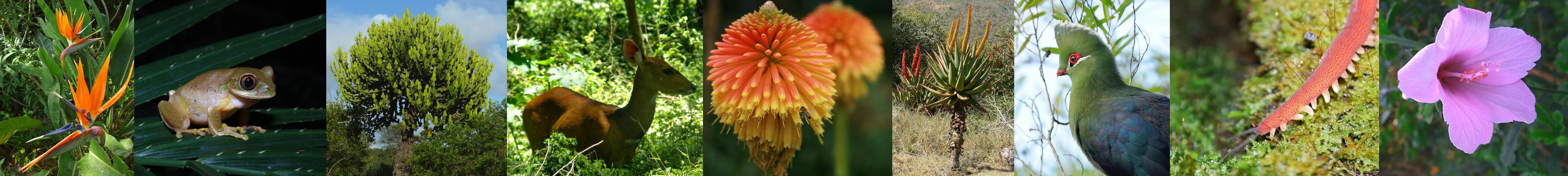
From left to right: Strelitzia reginae, Leptopelis natalensis, Euphorbia cooperi, Blue duiker (Philantomba monticola), Kniphofia rooperi, Aloe ferox, Knysna loerie (Tauraco corythaix), Onychophora sp, Hibiscus pedunculatus

== List of endemic plants (incomplete) ==
The endemic plants found in the Maputaland-Pondoland-Albany Hotspot include:

- Albizia suluensis
- Allophylus natalensis
- Aloe thraskii
- Atalaya alata
- Atalaya natalensis
- Baphia racemosa
- Brachylaena discolor
- Deinbollia oblongifolia
- Encephalartos natalensis
- Encephalartos woodii
- Ficus bizanae
- Isoglossa woodii
- Jubaeopsis afra
- Millettia grandis
- Raphia australis
- Stangeria eriopus
- Tephrosia pondoensis

== Gallery ==
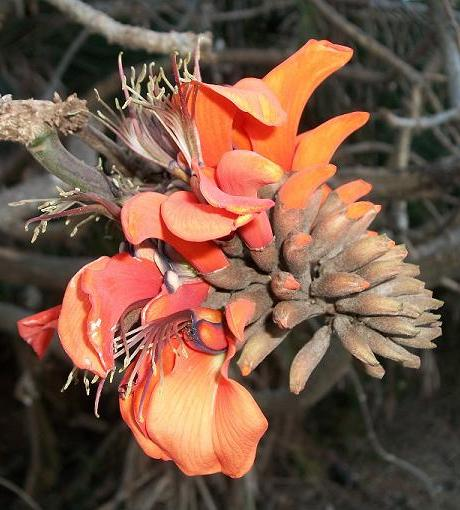
Erythrina afra; endemic to the Maputaland-Pondoland-Albany Hotspot

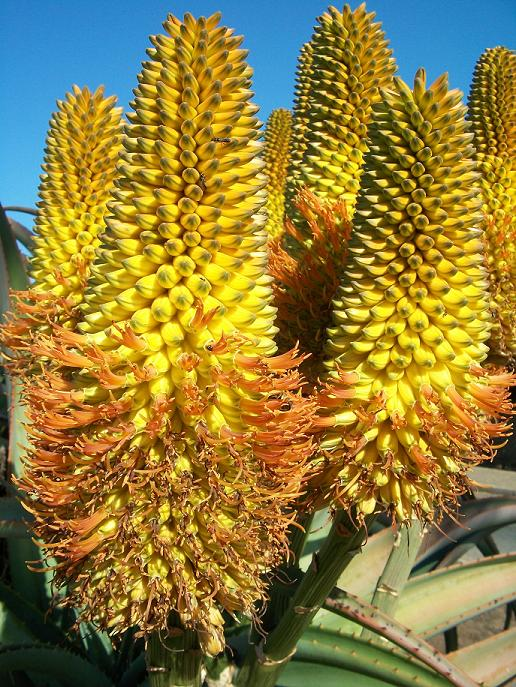
Aloe thraskii; endemic to the Maputaland-Pondoland-Albany Hotspot

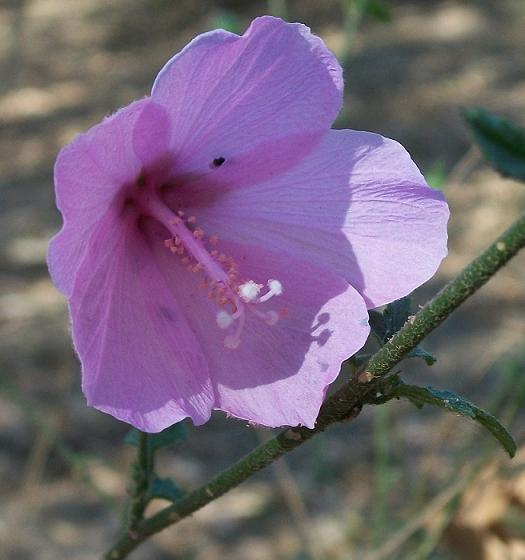
Hibiscus pedunculatus; near-endemic to the Maputaland-Pondoland-Albany Hotspot

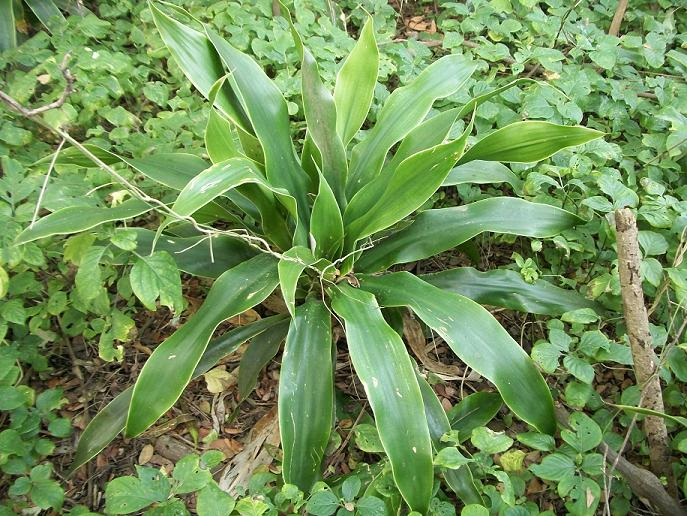
Dracaena aletriformis (near-endemic) and Isoglossa woodii (endemic)

== See also ==
- Maputaland-Pondoland bushland and thickets – Montane shrubland ecoregion in South Africa
- Maputaland – Natural region in South Africa in northern KwaZulu-Natal
- EmaMpondweni, also known as Pondoland
- Albany, South Africa
- Forests of KwaZulu-Natal – Forest vegetation type in South Africa
- Ezemvelo KZN Wildlife – South African wildlife conservation organisation
- Mkhambathi Nature Reserve – Coastal nature reserve at Lusikisiki in the Eastern Cape, South Africa
- Umtamvuna Nature Reserve – Coastal nature reserve in South Africa

== Bibliography ==
- Pooley, E. (1993). The Complete Field Guide to Trees of Natal, Zululand and Transkei. ISBN 0-620-17697-0.
- Pooley, E. (1998). A Field Guide to Wild Flowers; KwaZulu-Natal and the Eastern Region. ISBN 0-620-21500-3.
