= Centre of endemism =

A centre of endemism is an area in which the ranges of restricted-range species overlap, or a localised area which has a high occurrence of endemics. Centres of endemism may overlap with biodiversity hotspots which are biogeographic regions characterized both by high levels of plant endemism and by serious levels of habitat loss. The exact delineation of centres of endemism is difficult and some overlap with one another. Centres of endemism are high conservation priority areas.

== Examples of centres of endemism ==
Tanzania

A local centre of endemism is focused on an area of lowland forests around the plateaux inland of Lindi in southeastern Tanzania, with between 40 and 91 species of vascular plants which are not found elsewhere.

Southern Africa

There are at least 19 centres of plant endemism, including the following:

- Albany Centre of Plant Endemism
- Barberton Centre of Plant Endemism
- Cape Floristic Region
- Drakensberg Alpine Centre
- Hantam–Roggeveld Centre of Plant Endemism
- Kaokoveld Centre of Endemism
- Maputaland Centre of Plant Endemism
- Pondoland Centre of Plant Endemism
- Sekhukhuneland Centre of Endemism
- Soutpansberg Centre of Plant Endemism

== See also ==
- List of ecoregions with high endemism
