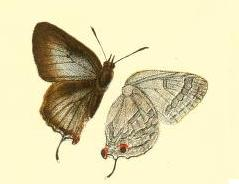

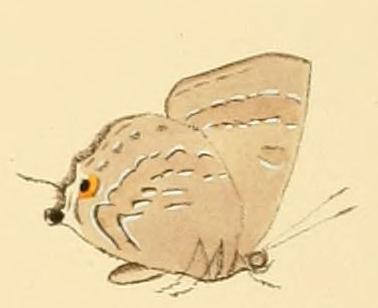

Scientific classification
- Kingdom: Animalia
- Phylum: Arthropoda
- Class: Insecta
- Order: Lepidoptera
- Family: Lycaenidae
- Genus: Deudorix
- Species: D. diocles

Binomial name
- Deudorix diocles Hewitson, 1869

Synonyms
- Virachola diocles; Deudorix (Virachola) diocles; Deudorix vosseleri Strand, 1911; Deudorix batikelides Holland, 1920

= Deudorix diocles =

Orange-barred playboy

Species of butterfly

Deudorix diocles, the orange-barred playboy, is a butterfly of the family Lycaenidae. It is found in Mozambique, from Zimbabwe to Zaïre and in Uganda, Kenya and South Africa. In South Africa it is found along the east coast from the Eastern Cape to KwaZulu-Natal, then north along the foothills of the escarpment to Mpumalanga and Limpopo.

The wingspan is 26–36 mm for males and 29–41 mm for females. Adults are on wing year-round with peaks in September and March.

The larvae feed on the fruits and seeds of a wide range of plants, including Bauhinia galpinii, Millettia species (including M. caffra, M. sutherlandii, M. grandis), Caesalpinia pulcherrima, Baphia species (including B. racemosa), Acacia, Bauhinia, Caesalpinia, Schotia, Macadamia, Prunus, Combretum and Syzygium.
