= List of ecoregions with high endemism =

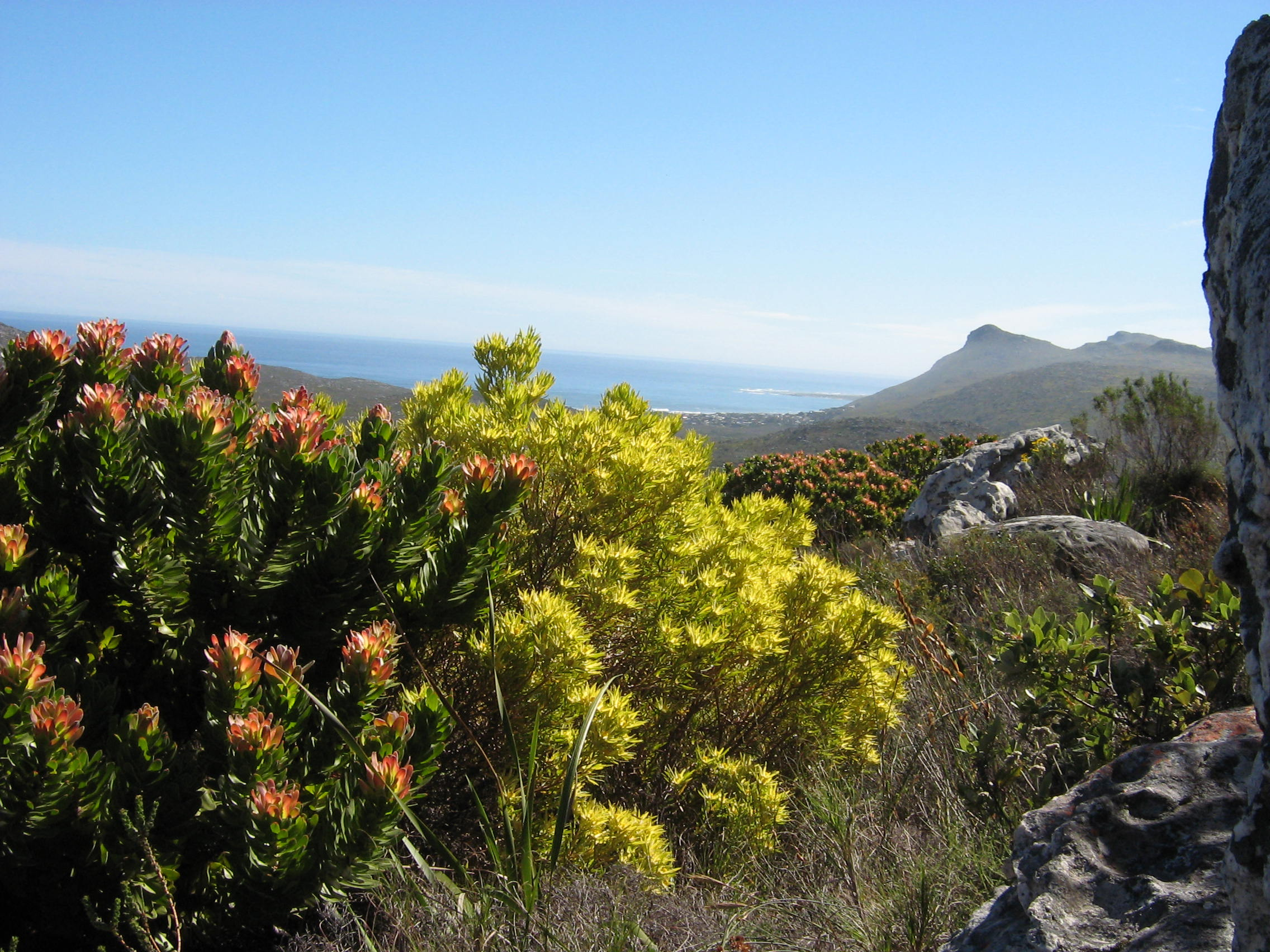
The fynbos of the Cape region of South Africa contains many endemic species of flowering plant.

This list is for ecoregions with high endemism. According to the World Wide Fund for Nature, the following ecoregions have the highest percentage of endemic plants.

== Ecoregions ==
- Fynbos (South Africa)
- Hawaiian tropical dry forests (United States)
- Hawaiian tropical rainforests (United States)
- Kwongan heathlands (Australia)
- Madagascar dry deciduous forests (Madagascar)
- Madagascar lowland forests (Madagascar)
- New Caledonia dry forests (New Caledonia)
- New Caledonia rain forests (New Caledonia)
- Sierra Madre de Oaxaca pine-oak forests (Mexico)
- Sierra Madre del Sur pine-oak forests (Mexico)
- Luzon montane rainforests (Philippines)
- Luzon rainforests (Philippines)
- Luzon tropical pine forests (Philippines)
- Mindanao montane rain forests (Philippines)
- Mindanao-Eastern Visayas rain forests (Philippines)
- Palawan rain forests (Philippines)

== See also ==
- Centre of endemism
- Endemism in the Hawaiian Islands
