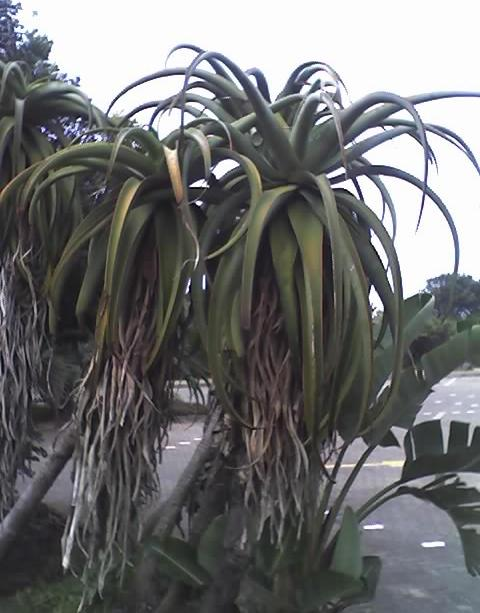

Conservation status
- CITES Appendix II (CITES)

Scientific classification
- Kingdom: Plantae
- Clade: Tracheophytes
- Clade: Angiosperms
- Clade: Monocots
- Order: Asparagales
- Family: Asphodelaceae
- Subfamily: Asphodeloideae
- Genus: Aloe
- Species: A. thraskii

Binomial name
- Aloe thraskii Baker

Synonyms
- Aloe fraskii Croucher

= Aloe thraskii =

Species of succulent flowering plant

Aloe thraskii, the dune aloe, is a South African plant in the genus Aloe.

== Description ==
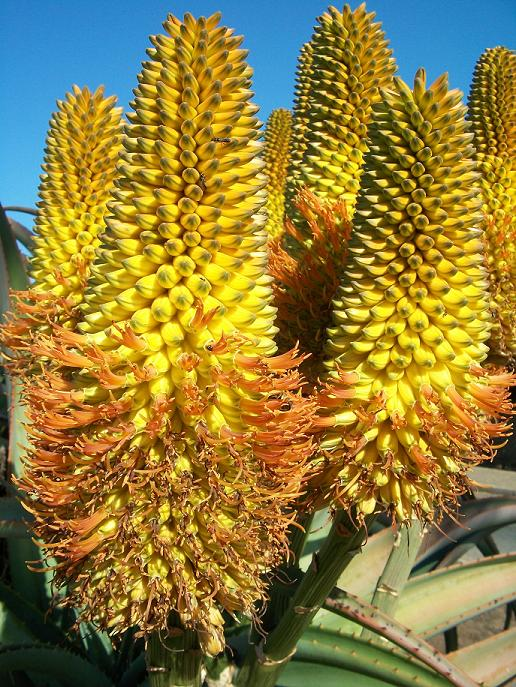
The orange-yellow flowers, growing on the typically compact, cylindrical racemes

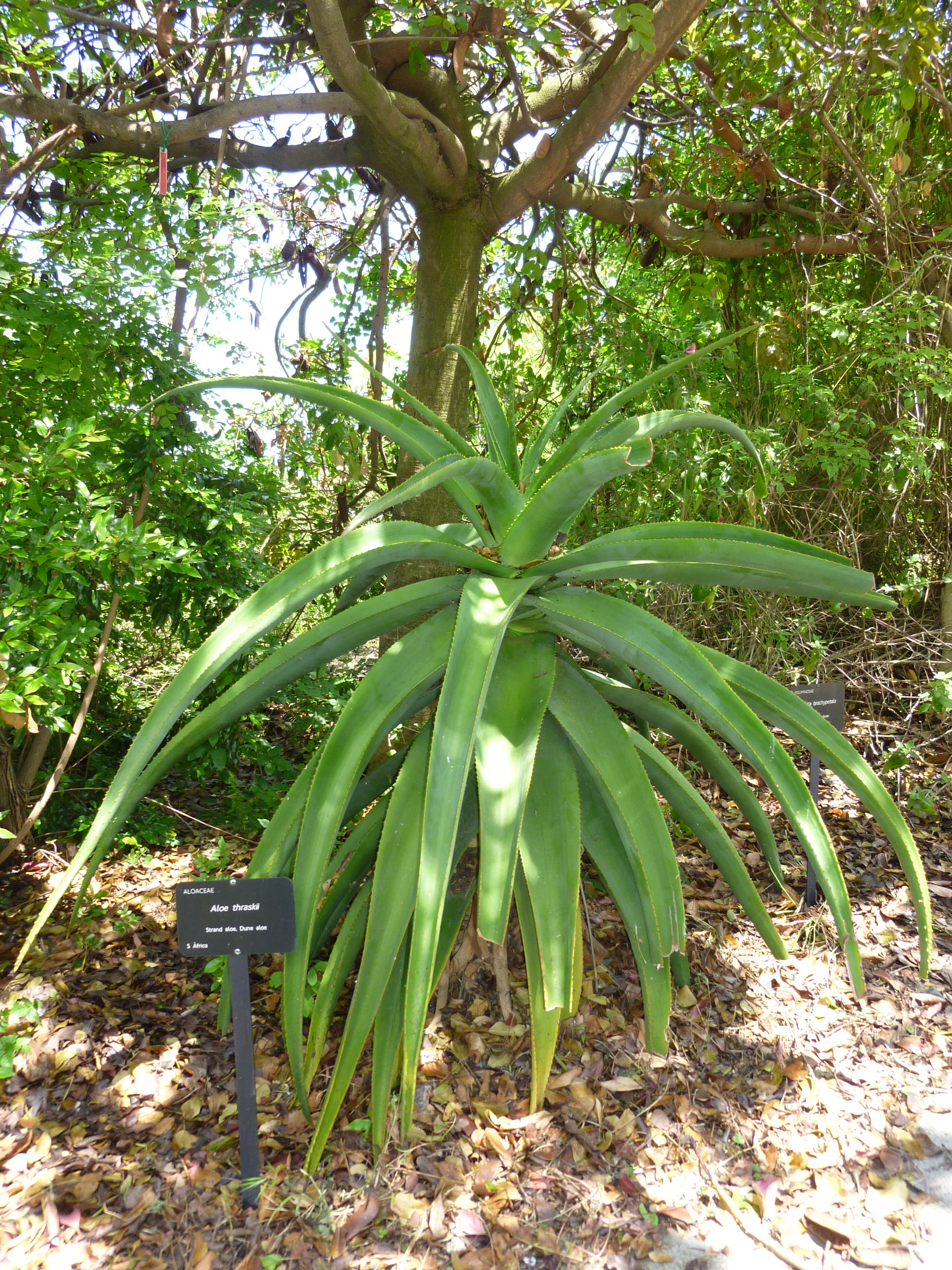
Young plant in cultivation

The dune aloe is a tall, fast-growing, un-branched aloe, which develops a very large rosette. The long, pale, grey-green leaves are deeply grooved or channeled (U-shaped in cross-section) and recurve downwards.

The orange and yellow flowers grow in short, compact, cylindrical racemes, on multi-branched inflorescences.

== Distribution ==
These plants are naturally found in dune vegetation along the coast of KwaZulu-Natal and the Eastern Cape of South Africa.

== See also ==
- Maputaland-Pondoland-Albany Hotspot
