= Pondoland Centre of Plant Endemism =

The Pondoland Centre of Plant Endemism is situated in the coastal region overlapping the provinces of KwaZulu-Natal and the Eastern Cape in South Africa. It is named after Pondoland and falls within the Maputaland-Pondoland-Albany Hotspot. The region consists of grassy plateaus incised by forested ravines and gorges. The main substrate in the area is Natal Group Sandstone, which was formed by sediments laid down about 500 million years ago in a rift underlying the eastern Agulhas Sea in the ancient continent of Gondwana. The region is about 18,800 hectares in extent, and lies along the coastline stretching about 15 kilometres inland with a maximum altitude of about 400 to 500 metres above sea level. The region is essentially a transition zone between sub-tropical and temperate climates.

== Endemics ==
Some notable endemic plants include Sanderson's bladderwort (Utricularia sandersonii), the pondo coconut (Jubaeopsis afra), the Pondoland ghost bush (Raspalia trigyna), the Pondoland conebush (Leucadendron pondoense), pondo khat (Catha abbottii), pondo waterwood (Syzygium pondoense) and pondo poison pea (Tephrosia pondoensis).

An endemic species of lizard, the pondo dwarf chameleon (Bradypodion caffrum), is also found only in this region.

== Protected areas ==
- Umtamvuna Nature Reserve
- Mkhambathi Nature Reserve

== Threats ==
A National Road through this centre of endemism has been given the go-ahead despite environmental concerns.

== Bibliography ==
- Pooley, E. (1993). The Complete Field Guide to Trees of Natal, Zululand and Transkei ISBN 0-620-17697-0.
