= Albany Centre of Plant Endemism =

The Albany Centre of Plant Endemism is situated in the coastal region of South Africa at the eastern end of the Eastern Cape Province. It is named after the district of Albany and falls within the Maputaland-Pondoland-Albany Hotspot. It is notable for its biodiversity and unique, endemic flora and fauna.

The Albany area is of extreme ecological importance because of its unique indigenous vegetation, composed of deep, lush "Albany thickets". Albany thicket is an ecoregion and biodiversity hotspot of dense woodland, containing many endemic species. Ecologically it forms part of the greater Cape Floristic Region. The coastal belt has a temperate climate, with winter rainfall of 500 to 700 mm (20 to 28 in) per annum or more. In the interior, the terrain is mostly dry Karoo and grasslands.
