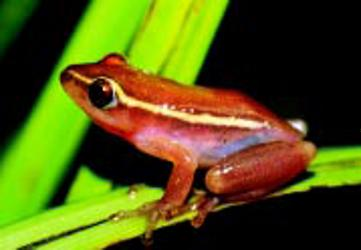
- Hyperolius pickersgilli (male striped form)

Conservation status
- Endangered (IUCN 3.1)

Scientific classification
- Kingdom: Animalia
- Phylum: Chordata
- Class: Amphibia
- Order: Anura
- Family: Hyperoliidae
- Genus: Hyperolius
- Species: H. pickersgilli

Binomial name
- Hyperolius pickersgilli Raw, 1982

= Pickersgill's reed frog =

Species of amphibian in the family Hyperoliidae endemic to South Africa

Pickersgill's reed frog (Hyperolius pickersgilli), also known as Avoca reed frog, is a species of frog in the family Hyperoliidae. It is endemic to South Africa. It occurs in the coastal lowlands of KwaZulu-Natal between Sezela and St Lucia.

== Description ==
Adult males grow to usually no more than 22 mm (0.9 in) whereas adult female can approach 30 mm (1.2 in) in snout–vent length. The snout is acutely pointed. The tympanum is hidden. The toes are webbed. There are two colour phases. Juveniles and males are dorsally light to dark brown. There is a dark-edged, white to silver canthal stripe that passes round the snout, over the eyes, and then continues dorso-laterally to the groin. The feet and concealed parts of the limbs are yellow, while the throat and the ventrum are yellowish to white. Females change to the female colour phase at length of 20–22 mm (0.8–0.9 in). The dorsum becomes green, eventually light to yellowish green, whereas the dorso-lateral stripes become indistinct and eventually disappear. The light yellow to white ventral colouration is separated from the dorsal colouration with a distinct irregular margin.

Males have a gular vocal sac that has a well-developed protective flap over it. The male advertisement call is a quiet slow creak that could be mistaken for an insect call.

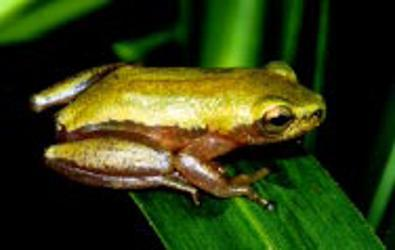
Hyperolius pickersgilli female green form

== Habitat and conservation ==
Pickersgill's reed frog is a habitat specialist that mainly occurs in Indian Ocean Coastal Belt "Vegetation Group 2", at elevations up to 380 m (1,250 ft) above sea level. It requires perennial wetlands that have very dense reed beds. This habitat type is highly endangered and poorly protected. The species occurs in the iSimangaliso Wetland Park, Umlalazi Nature Reserve, Ongoye Forest Reserve, and Twinstreams-Mtunzini Natural Heritage Site.
