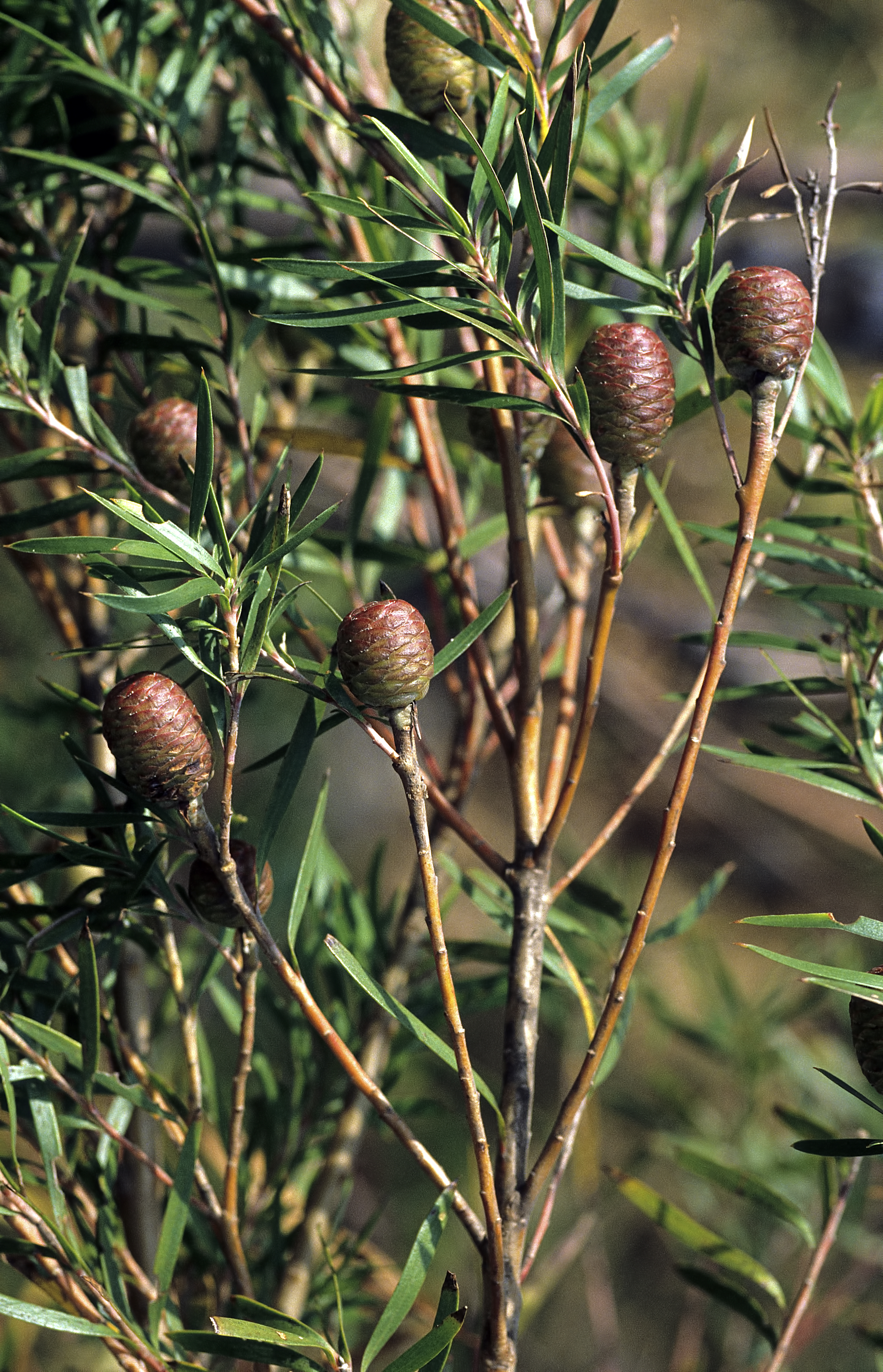

Conservation status
- Vulnerable (IUCN 3.1)

Scientific classification
- Kingdom: Plantae
- Clade: Embryophytes
- Clade: Tracheophytes
- Clade: Spermatophytes
- Clade: Angiosperms
- Clade: Eudicots
- Order: Proteales
- Family: Proteaceae
- Genus: Leucadendron
- Species: L. pondoense

Binomial name
- Leucadendron pondoense A.E.van Wyk

= Leucadendron pondoense =

Species of plant

Leucadendron pondoense, the Pondoland conebush, is a flower-bearing shrub that belongs to the genus Leucadendron and forms part of the fynbos. The plant is native to the Eastern Cape, South Africa, where it occurs in the Pondoland from Port St. Johns to Port Edward.

== Description ==
The shrub grows 6 m (20 ft) tall and flowers from September to December. The plant dies after a fire but the seeds survive. The seeds are stored in a toll on the female plant and fall to the ground after a fire, possibly spreading by the wind. The plant is unisexual and there are separate plants with male and female flowers, which are pollinated by the wind.

== Distribution and habitat ==
The plant grows in river beds. The tree's national number is 81.4. In Afrikaans, it is known as Pondotolbos.

== Gallery ==
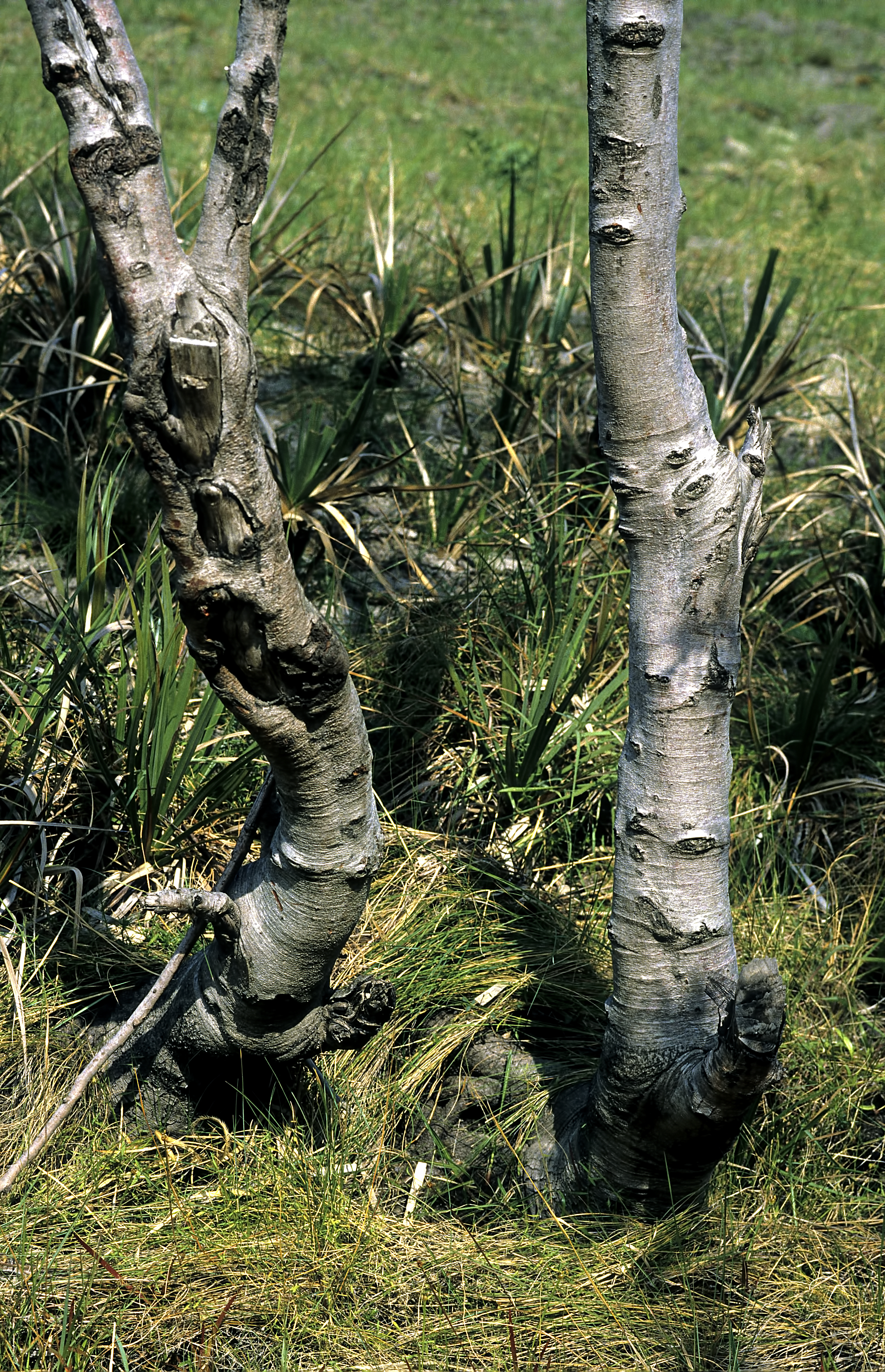

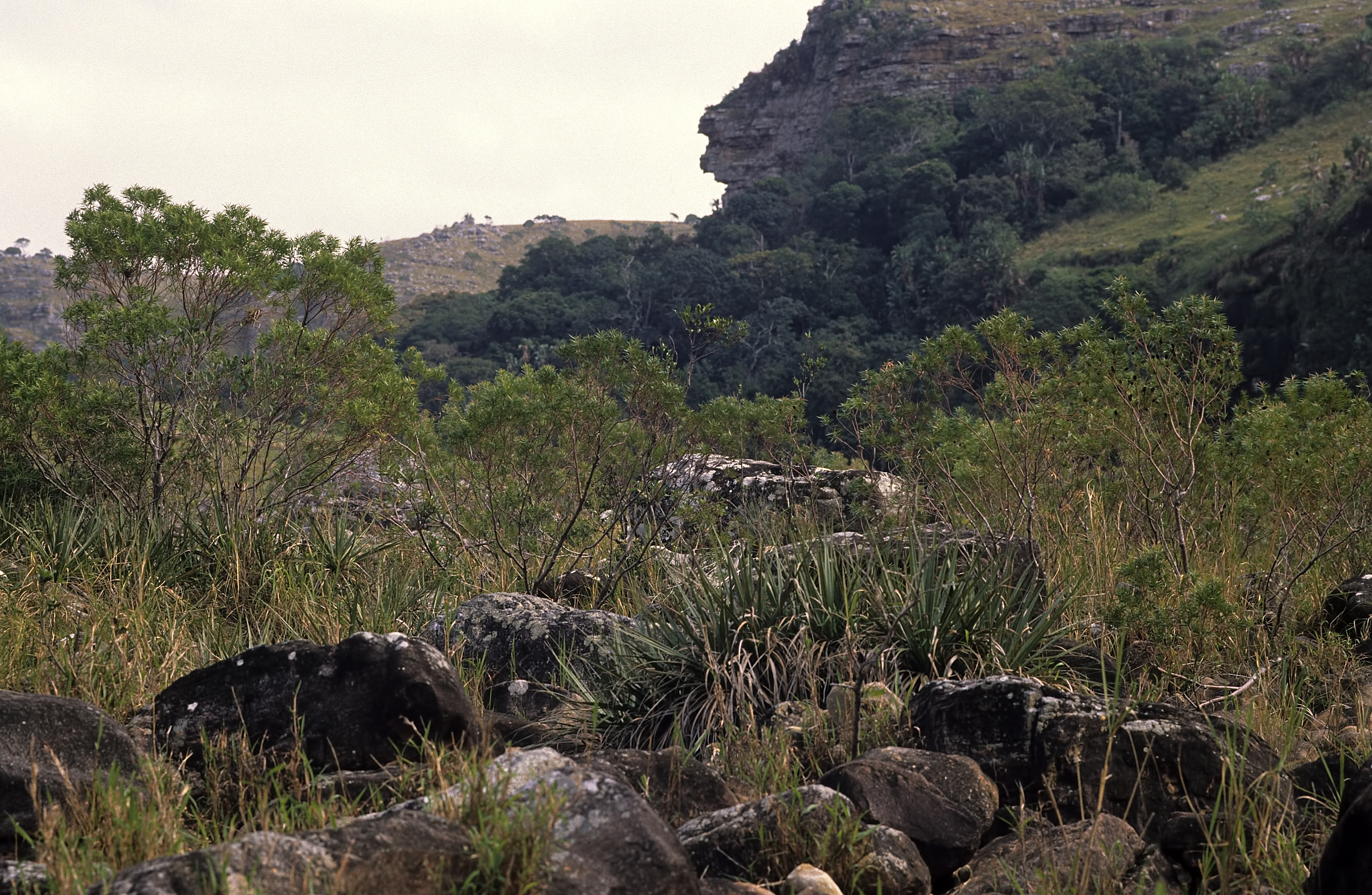

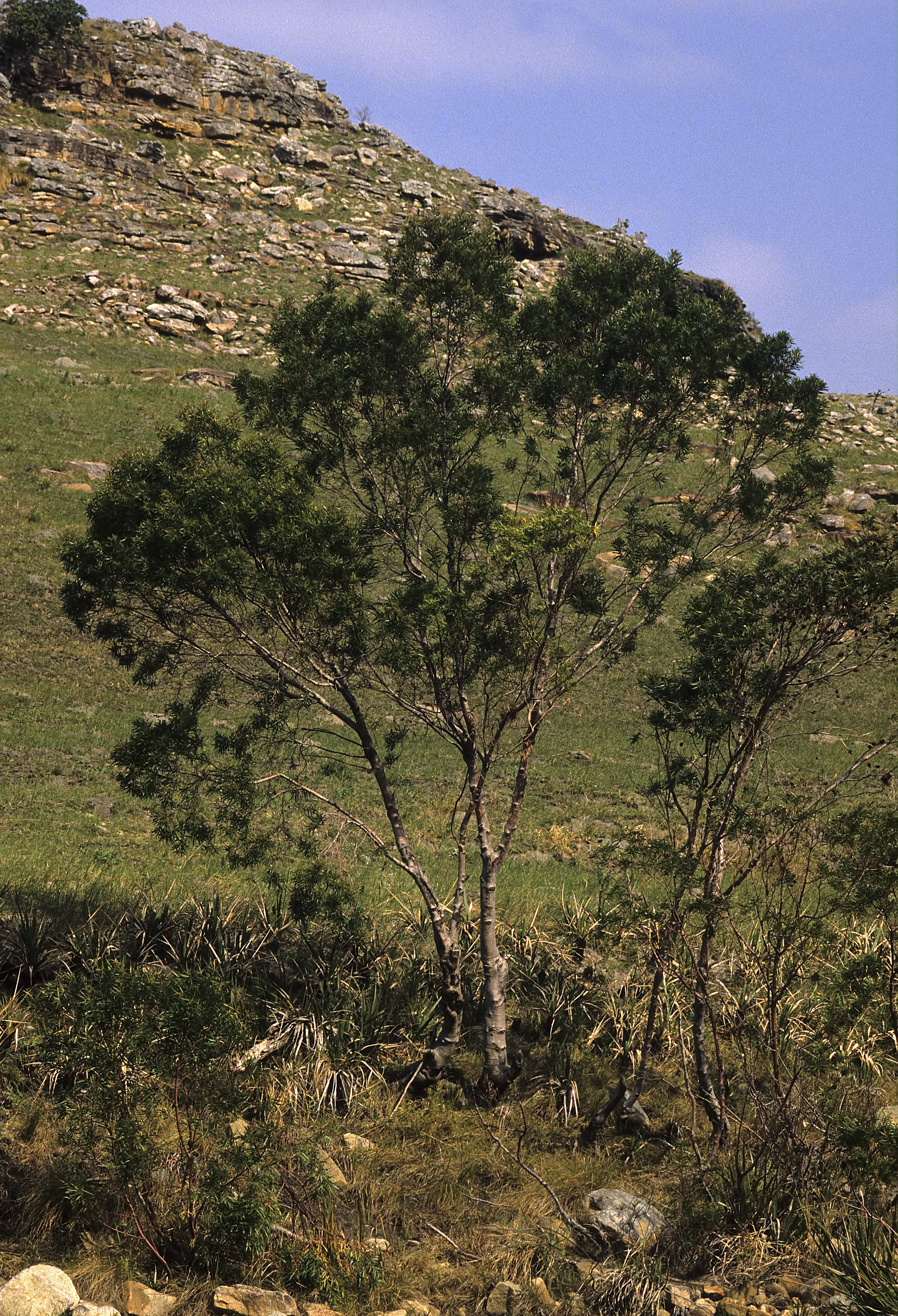

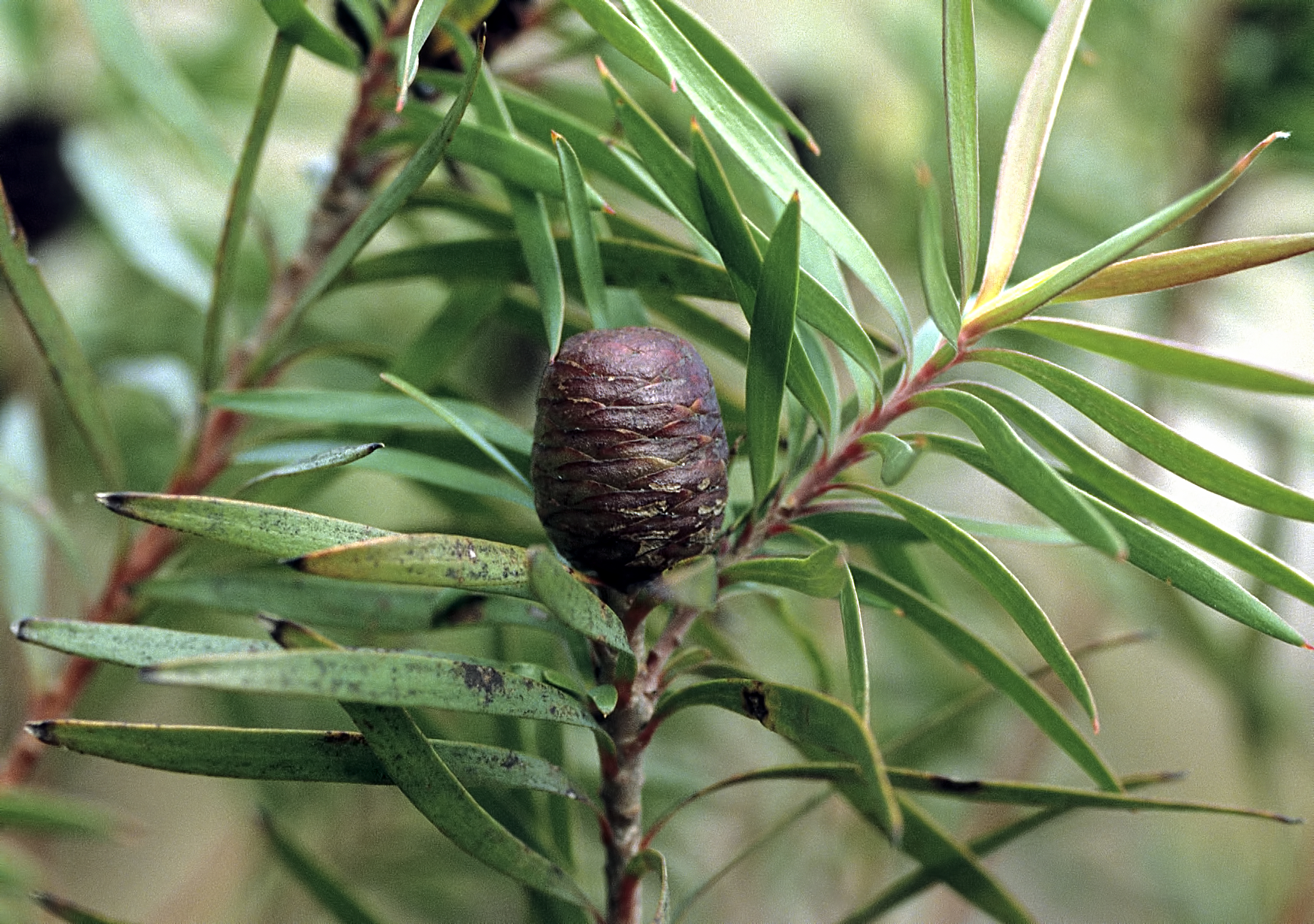

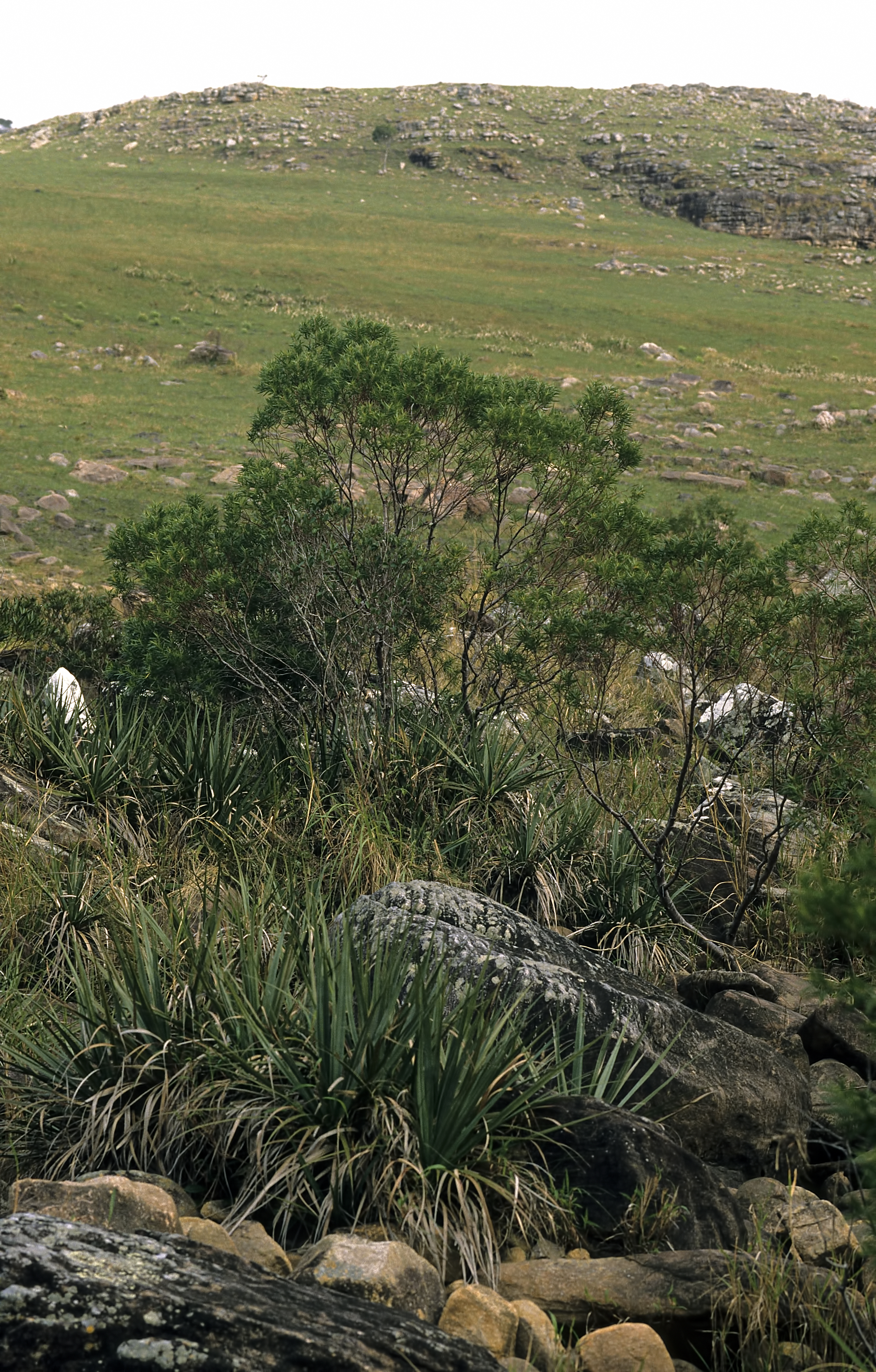

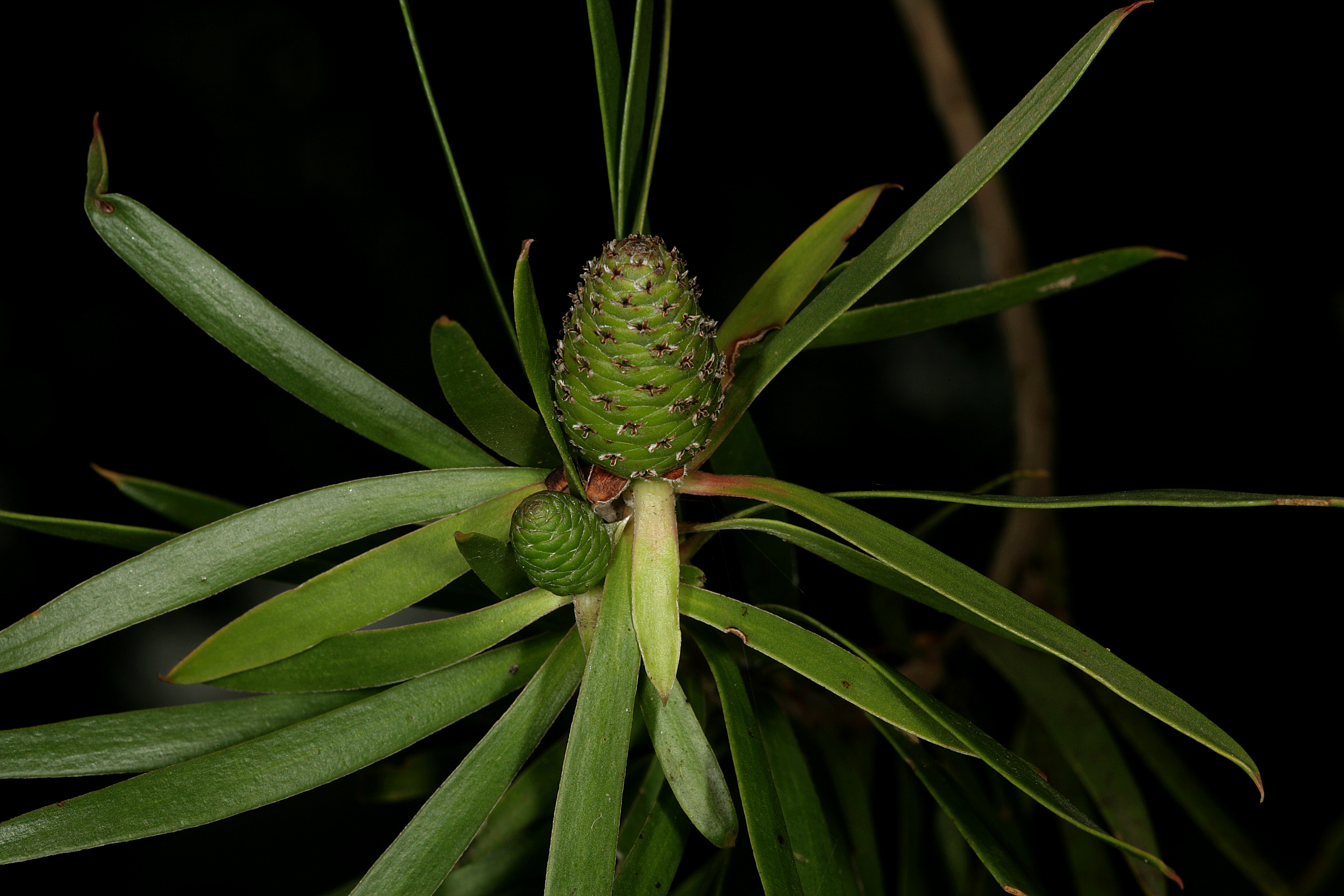

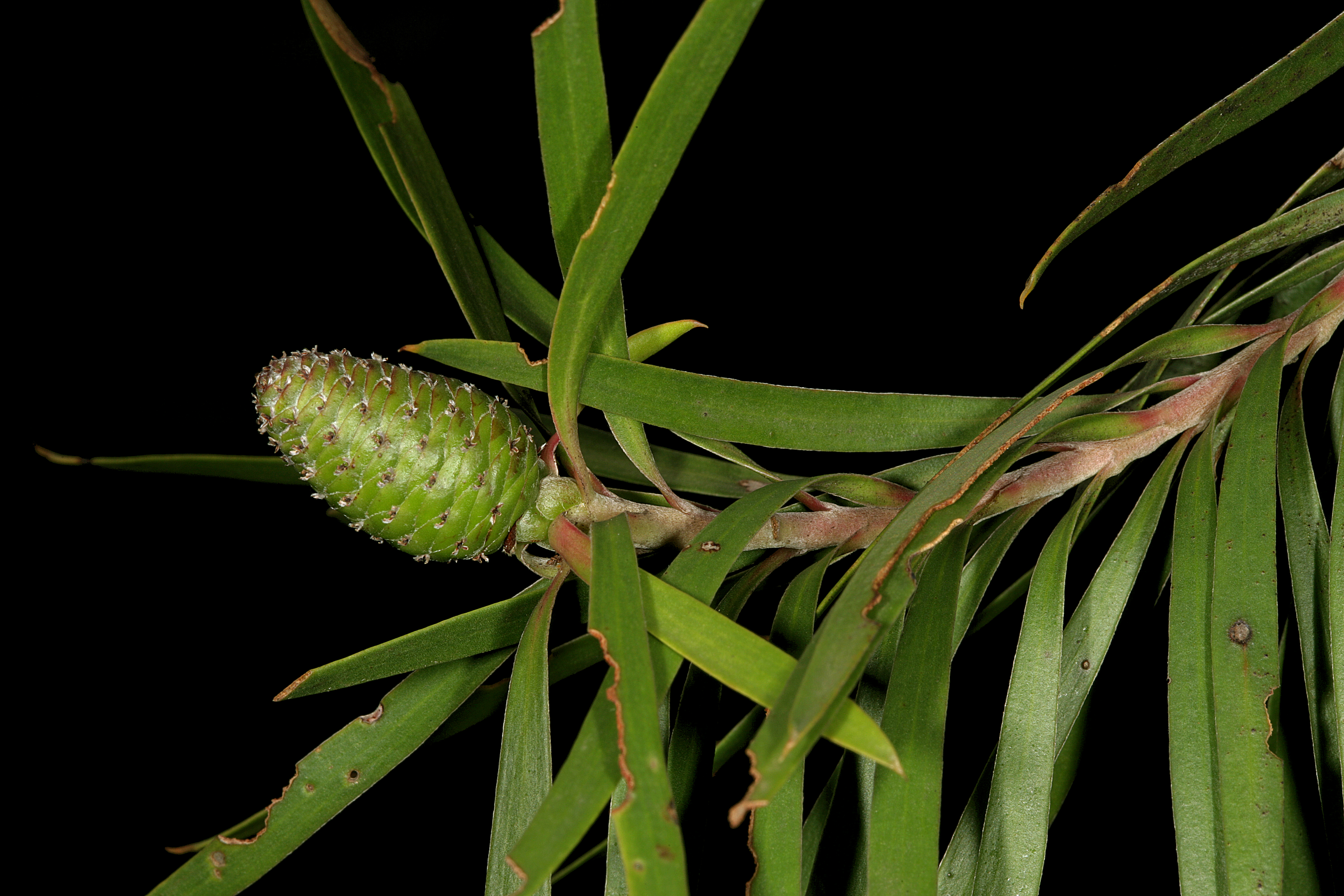

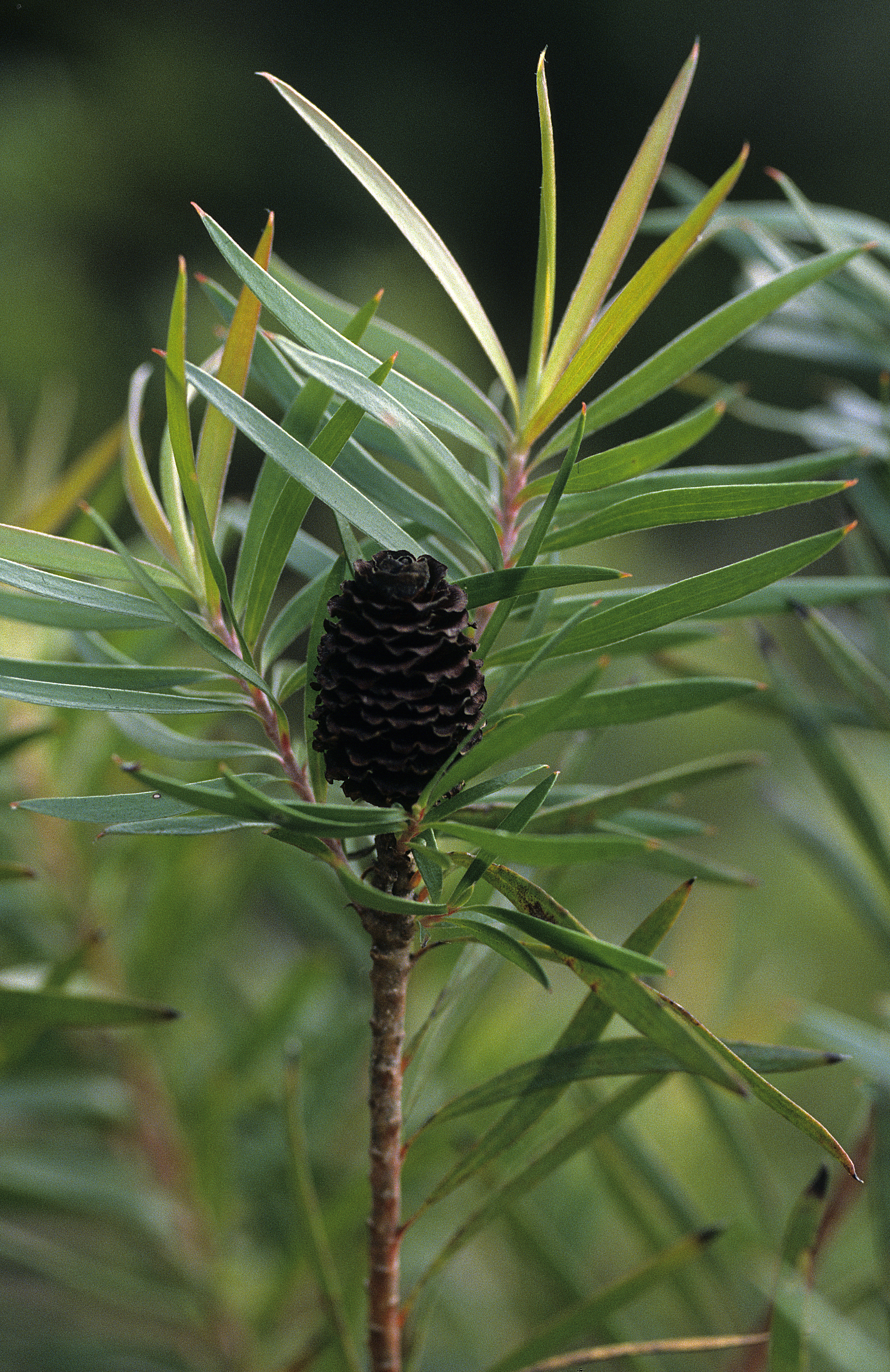
