= Bracteolaria =

Conservation status
- Least Concern (IUCN 3.1)

Scientific classification
- Kingdom: Plantae
- Clade: Tracheophytes
- Clade: Angiosperms
- Clade: Eudicots
- Clade: Rosids
- Order: Fabales
- Family: Fabaceae
- Genus: Bracteolaria; Hochst. (1841)
- Species: B. racemosa

Binomial name
- Bracteolaria racemosa Hochst.

Synonyms
- Baphia racemosa (Hochst.) Baker (1871)

Genus of plants

Bracteolaria racemosa is a species of flowering plant in the pea family (Fabaceae). It is the sole species in genus Bracteolaria. It is a shrub or tree native to South Africa, ranging from the Southern Cape Province to KwaZulu-Natal.
