= Maputaland Centre of Plant Endemism =

The Maputaland Centre of Plant Endemism is situated in the coastal region of South Africa in the northern part of the province of KwaZulu-Natal, and also includes the southernmost part of Mozambique. It forms part of the Maputaland-Pondoland-Albany Hotspot. It is notable for its biodiversity and unique, endemic flora and fauna.
