= Albany, South Africa =

Region in the Eastern Cape, South Africa

Coordinates: 33°18′S 26°32′E

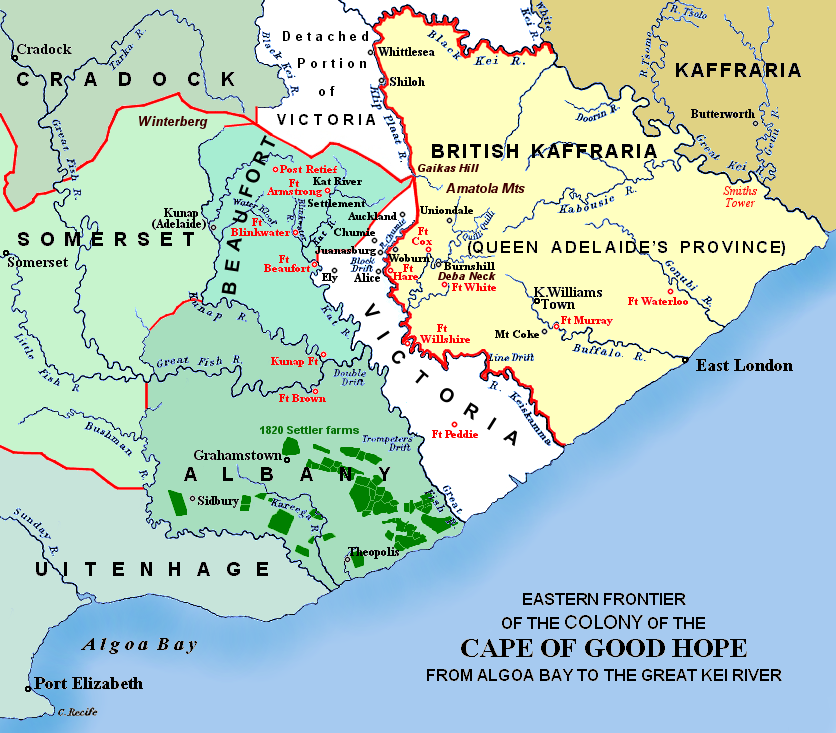
Albany on the Eastern Frontier, ca 1835

Albany, South Africa (also known as Cape Borders, Cape Frontier, Settler Country, and Western Region) was a district in the Eastern Cape, South Africa. Grahamstown was traditionally the administrative capital, cultural centre and largest town of the Albany district.

The area was previously known as the 'Zuurveld' by migrating Boer farmers in the late 18th century, and it lay near the boundary between the Cape Colony and the traditional Xhosa lands to the east. The 1820 Settlers were instrumental in settling and farming the district and giving it some of its distinctive local culture. The ANC government merged the Albany area with the large Xhosa township of Alice as the municipal area of 'Cacadu' .

== History ==
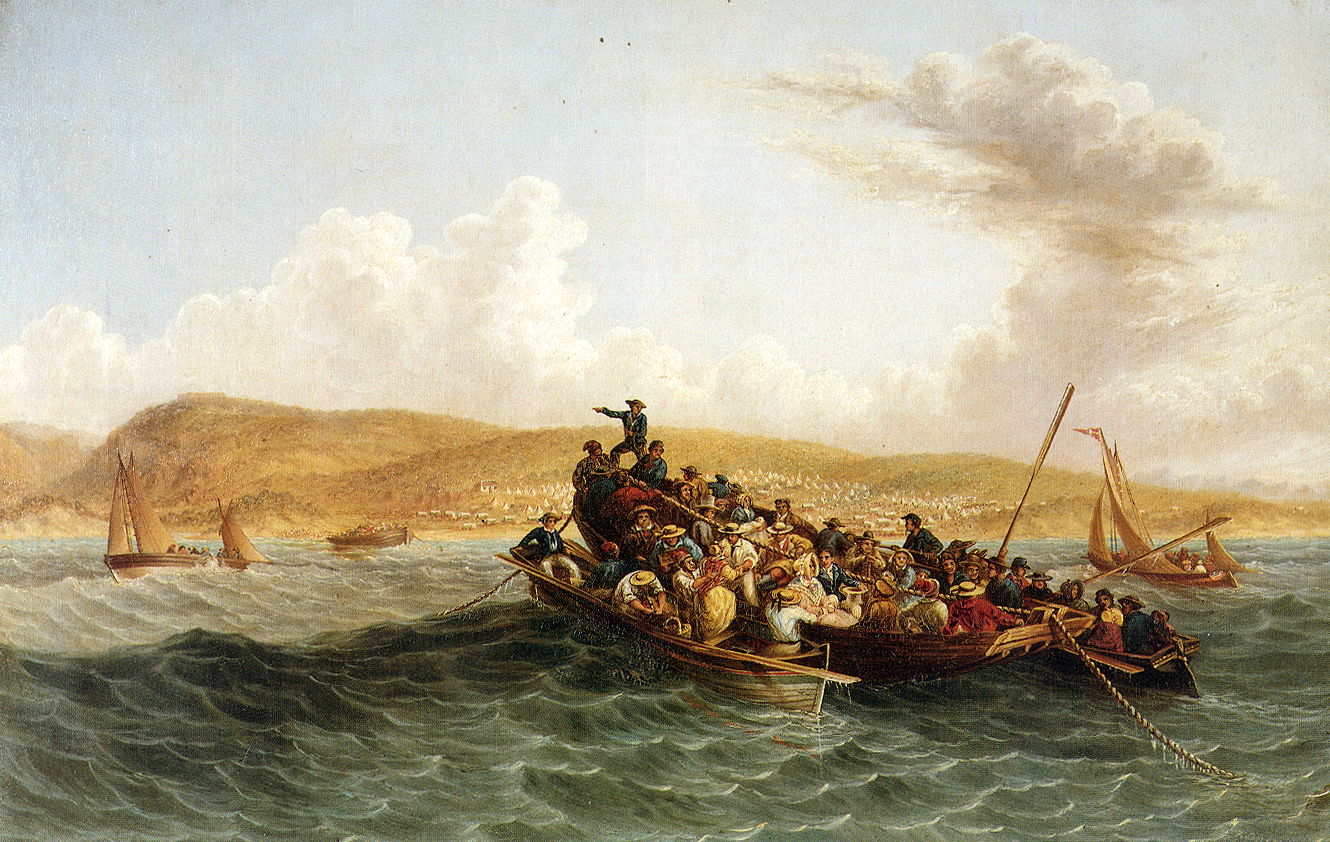
British settlers approaching Algoa Bay in 1820

General Jacob Cuyler, the Landdrost of the Uitenhage district, named the area between the Sundays and Fish rivers "Albany" after Albany in his native New York. Albany became the destination for the 1820 Settlers by the Cape Colony's new British masters. It accepted one of the largest waves of British immigrant settlers to South Africa, and the development of Albany was a milestone in the formation of the British diaspora. Grahamstown, Bathurst, and Port Alfred became important villages in Albany following the arrival of the 1820 Settlers.

== Geographical features ==
The district forms part of the rural hinterland beyond Port Elizabeth.

The Albany area is of extreme ecological importance because of its unique indigenous vegetation, composed of deep, lush "Albany thickets". Albany Thicket is an ecoregion and biodiversity hotspot of dense woodland, containing many endemic species. Ecologically it forms part of the greater Cape Floristic Region.

The coastal belt is a temperate, winter rainfall area, with rains of 500 to 700 mm per annum and above. Further to the interior, the terrain is mostly dry Karoo and grasslands composed of large commercial farms and vast expanses. Despite the arid interior, the Sundays and Fish rivers support extensive irrigated farming. They are fed by water from the Orange River under the Fish River Transfer Scheme.

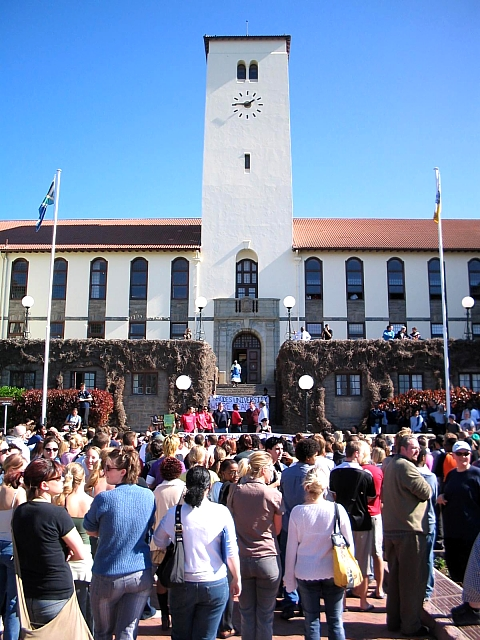
Rhodes University campus

== Culture ==
Grahamstown is still a major cultural centre, being home to both Rhodes University as well as the National Arts Festival. The university is the authority on South African English. The city, formed by John Graham, was traditionally the capital of the Albany District Council.

== See also ==
- List of heritage sites in Albany, South Africa
