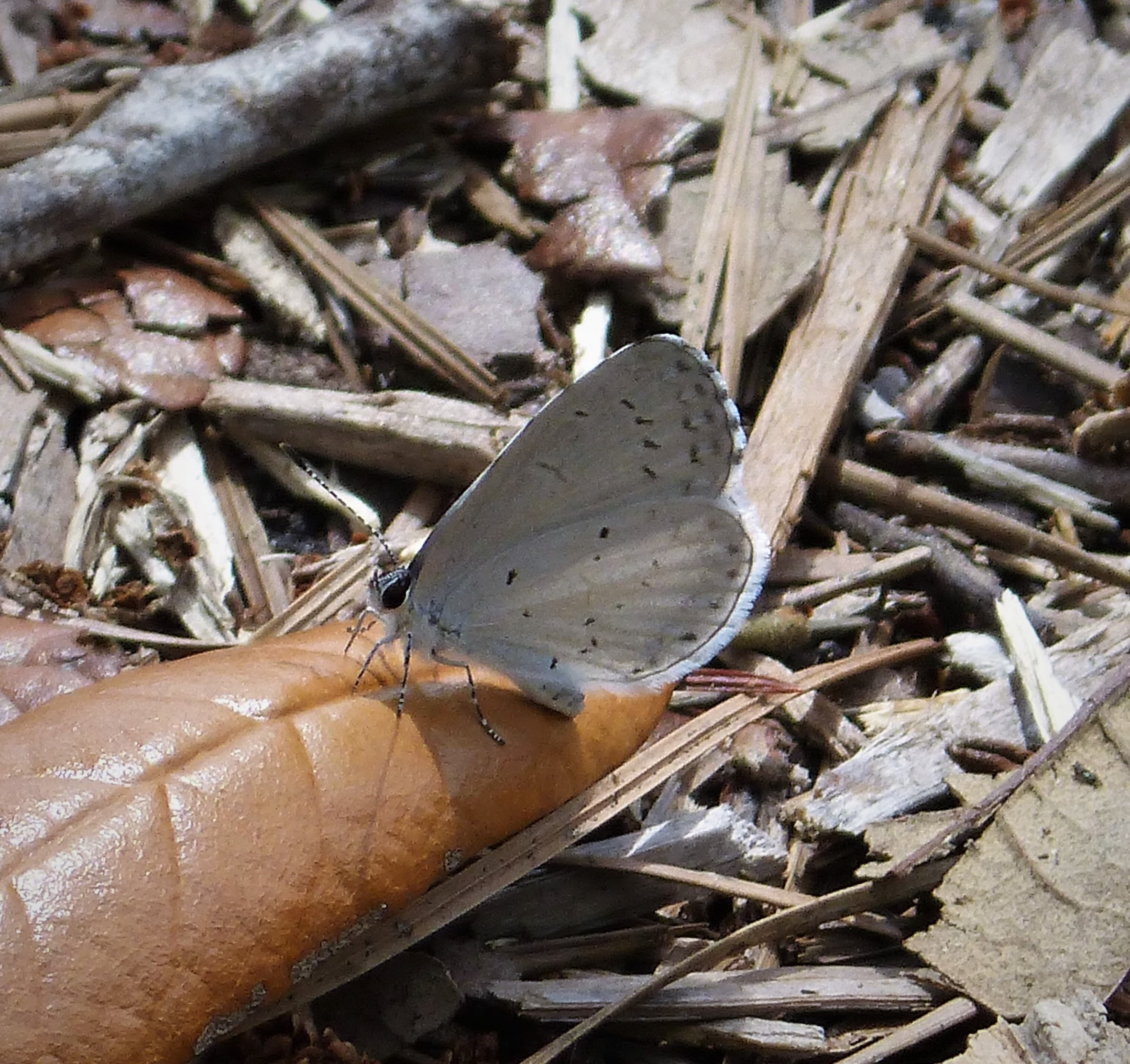

Conservation status
- Apparently Secure (NatureServe)

Scientific classification
- Kingdom: Animalia
- Phylum: Arthropoda
- Clade: Pancrustacea
- Class: Insecta
- Order: Lepidoptera
- Family: Lycaenidae
- Genus: Celastrina
- Species: C. idella

Binomial name
- Celastrina idella Wright and Pavulaan, 1999

= Celastrina idella =

Species of butterfly

Celastrina idella, the American holly azure, is a species of butterfly of the family Lycaenidae. It is found on the east coast of the United States.

== Description ==
=== Adults ===
The wing uppersides are uniform light blue or purplish-blue, shinier in females than in males, with white fringes. The wing undersides are light gray or white with dull black spots.

=== Larvae ===
Caterpillars vary in color between green and white. Some caterpillars develop white chevron markings on their back.

=== Differences from similar species ===
American holly azures differ from the co-occurring azure species by their smaller size, wing color, flight period, pupal diapause, and larval hosts. Northern azures have earlier flight and pupal periods, larger size, and more vivid adult and larval color. Spring azures can be distinguished by close examination of the wing scale structure in a captured individual but are otherwise nearly indistinguishable by sight. The spring flight of summer azure associates with black cherry and does not diapause before the summer flight, which begins after the end of the American holly azure flight. Appalachian azures and cherry gall azures have ranges west of the range of American holly azures.

== Range ==
The species' occurrence range extends along the Atlantic coastal plain of the United States, from New Jersey to Georgia.

== Life cycle ==
The species has one flight per year in the spring, between the flight periods of the northern azure and the spring brood of summer azure but overlapping with spring azure and cherry gall azure. The flight is from late April to late May in the northern part of the range.

=== Adults ===
Adults emerge to begin their single flight in spring, after remaining in the pupal stage during summer, autumn, winter, and early spring.

=== Eggs ===
Adults lay white eggs on buds of holly flowers.

=== Larvae ===
Caterpillars hatch and bore into the buds in late spring. Worker ants of a few species, including the ferruginous carpenter ant (Camponotus chromaiodes), an unnamed carpenter ant Camponotus nearcticus, and an unnamed citronella ant Lasius alienus, accompany the caterpillars.

=== Pupae ===
Caterpillars become light brown pupae in late spring or early summer. The pupae undergo diapause until spring.

== Food ==
=== Adult nectar sources ===
Adults take nectar from highbush blueberry (Vaccinium corymbosum), sand myrtle (Kalmia buxifolia), chokeberries (Aronia arbutifolia and Aronia melanocarpa), black cherry (Prunus serotina), red maple (Acer rubrum), and rock cress (Arabis sp.).

=== Larval host plants ===
Caterpillars eat the flowering parts of male plants of four species of holly: American holly (Ilex opaca), inkberry (Ilex glabra), smooth winterberry (Ilex laevigata), and Yaupon holly (Ilex vomitoria). Two possible alternative host plants are tall gallberry holly (Ilex coriacea) and Virginia willow (Itea virginica).

== Evolution and taxonomy ==
American holly azures co-occur with closely related azure species but differ in their host plant adaptation. Sympatric speciation may have occurred due to host plant specialization, i.e., different populations of azures may have genetically diverged once some populations adapted to a single host not used by other populations.
