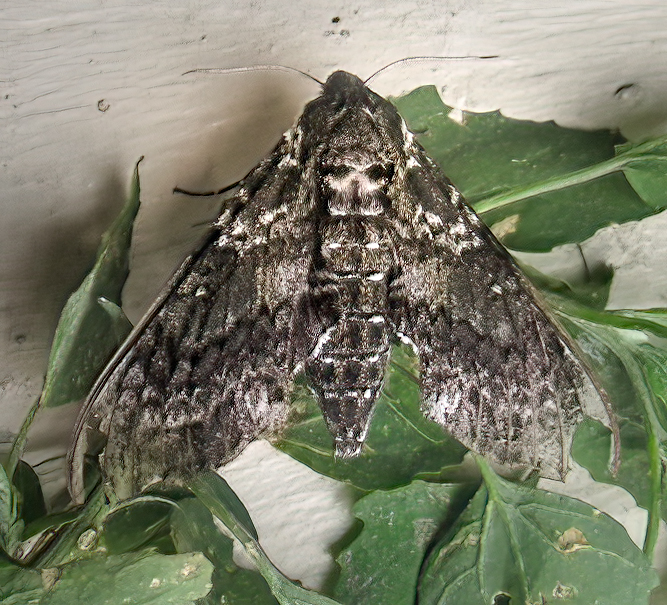

Scientific classification
- Domain: Eukaryota
- Kingdom: Animalia
- Phylum: Arthropoda
- Class: Insecta
- Order: Lepidoptera
- Family: Sphingidae
- Tribe: Sphingini
- Genus: Dolba; Walker, 1856
- Species: D. hyloeus

Binomial name
- Dolba hyloeus (Drury, 1773)

Synonyms
- Sphinx hyloeus Drury, 1773; Sphinx prini J. E. Smith, 1797; Dolba schausi Clark, 1917; Dolba hyloeus floridensis Clark, 1919

= Dolba =

Pawpaw sphinx

Genus of moths

Dolba is a monotypic moth genus in the family Sphingidae erected by Francis Walker in 1856. Its only species, Dolba hyloeus, the pawpaw sphinx, was first described by Dru Drury in 1773.

== Distribution ==
The pawpaw sphinx ranges throughout the eastern United States and southeastern Canada, south to Florida and west to Wisconsin, eastern Oklahoma, and southern Texas.

== Description ==
The wingspan is 50–68 millimetres (2.0–2.7 in). While the pawpaw sphinx's cryptic coloration appears similar to that of certain Noctuid moths, such as the members of genus Catocala, the pawpaw sphinx's forewings do not overlap at rest, such that part of the abdomen remains exposed. The pawpaw sphinx can be distinguished from the rustic sphinx (Manduca rustica) by the former's smaller size and the absence of orange dots on the abdomen that the rustic sphinx exposes in flight.

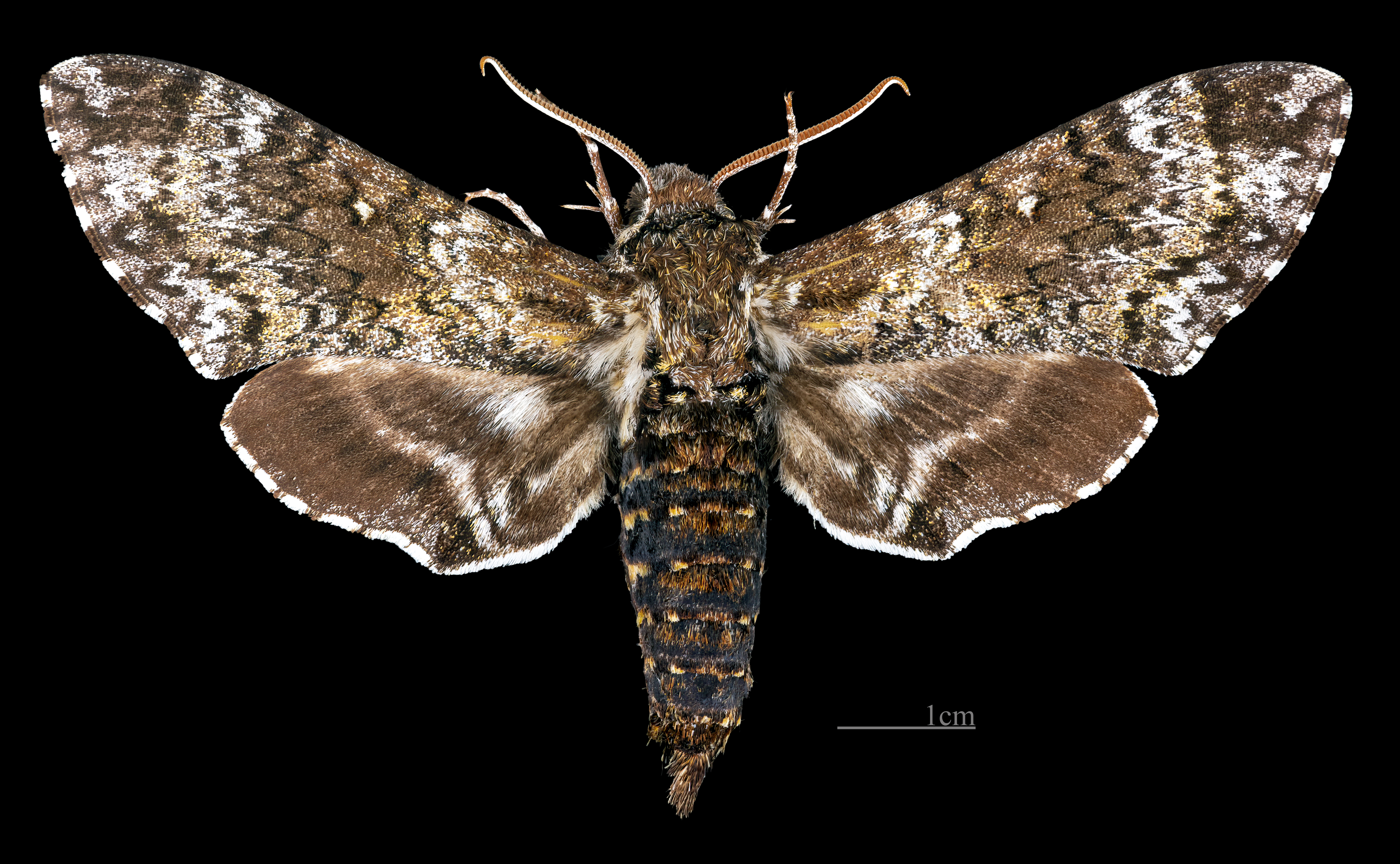
♂

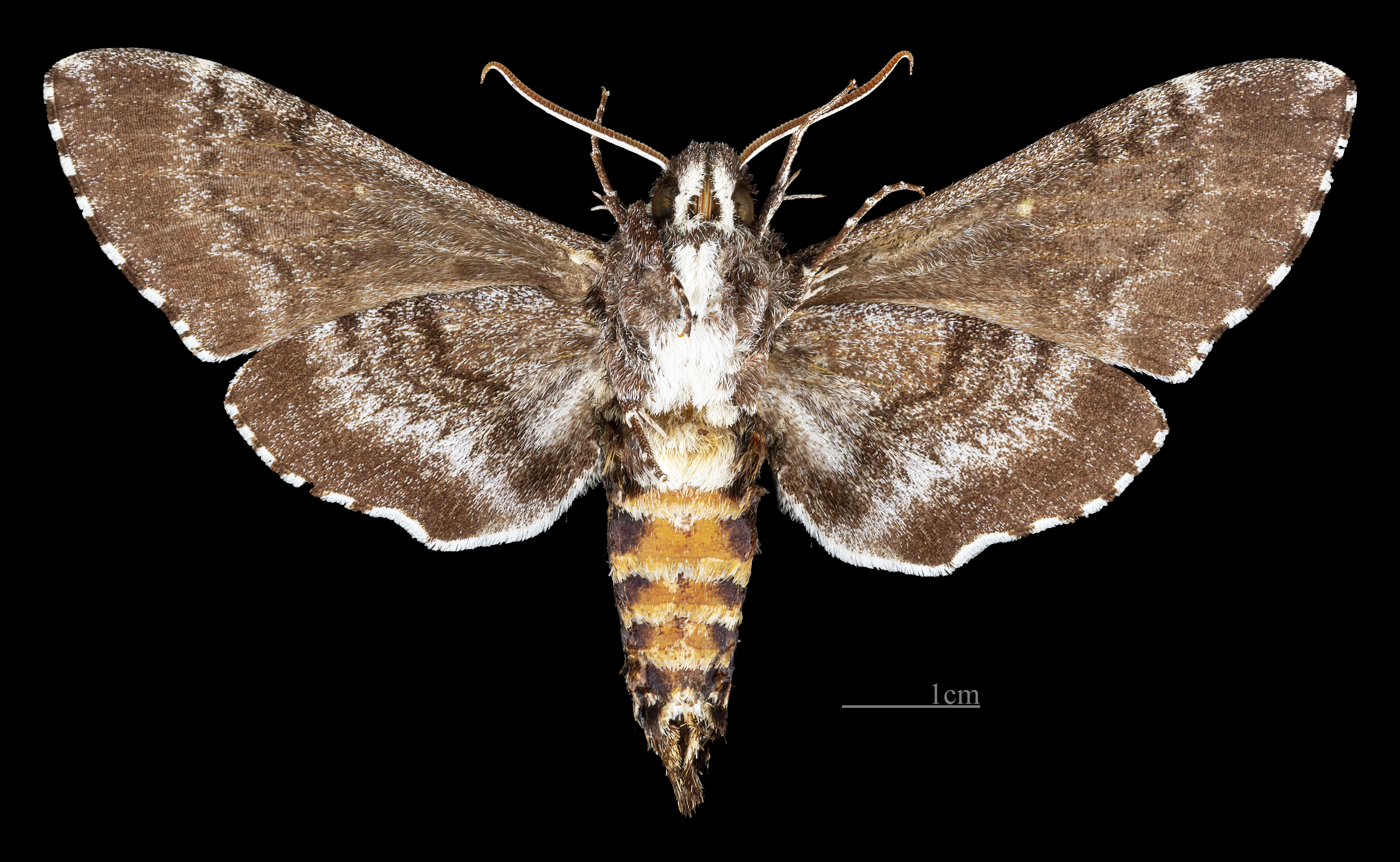
♂ △

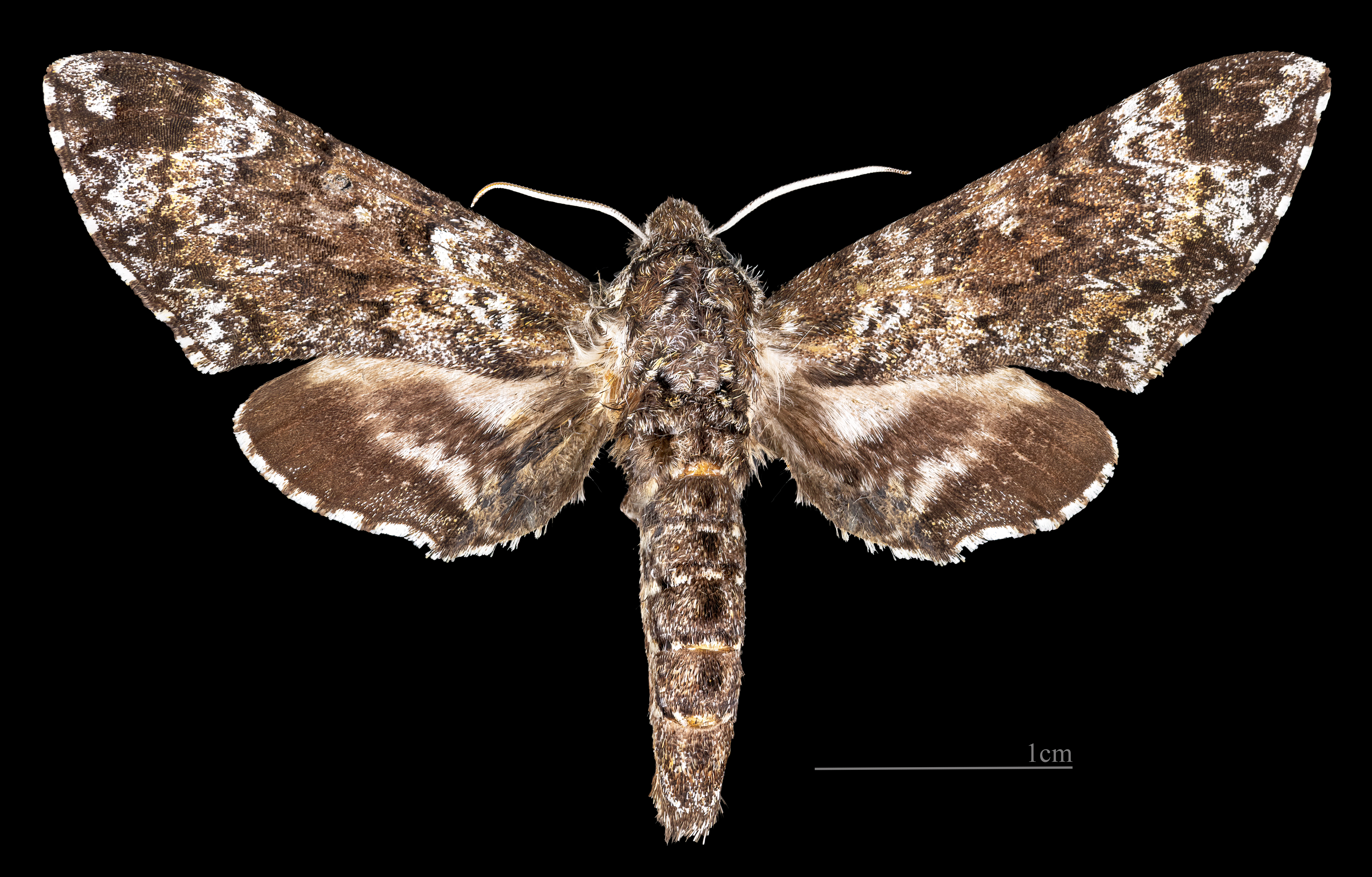
♀

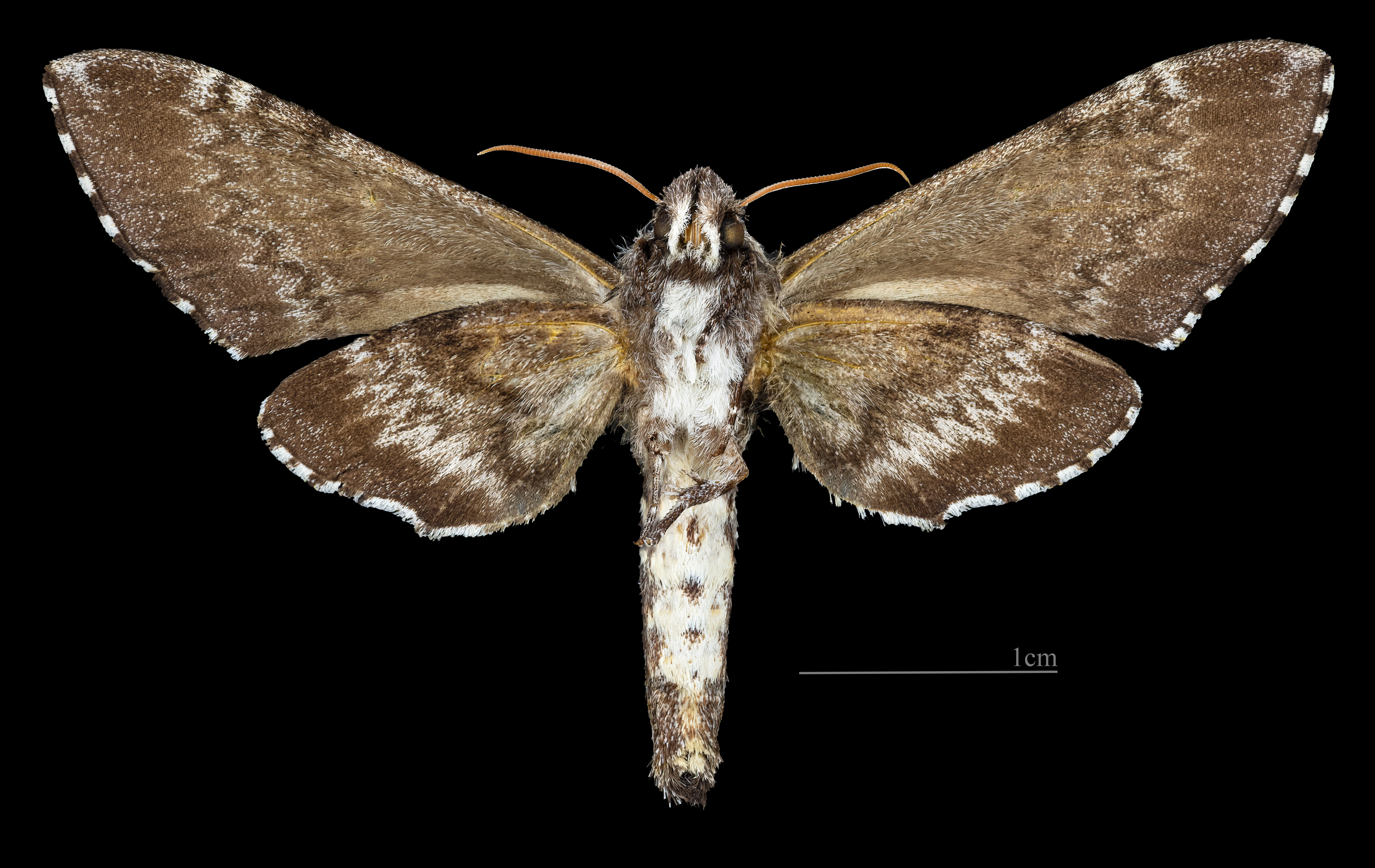
♀ △

== Biology ==
Larvae of this species feed on pawpaw, as well as blueberries and deciduous hollies such as inkberry and winterberry.
