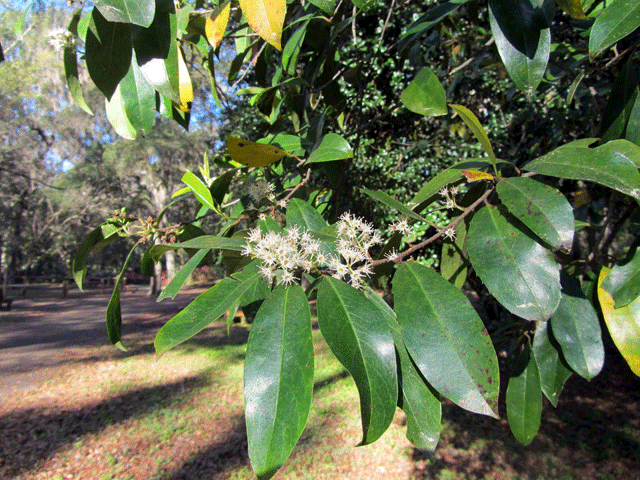

Conservation status
- Least Concern (IUCN 3.1)

Scientific classification
- Kingdom: Plantae
- Clade: Embryophytes
- Clade: Tracheophytes
- Clade: Angiosperms
- Clade: Eudicots
- Clade: Rosids
- Order: Rosales
- Family: Rosaceae
- Genus: Prunus
- Species: P. caroliniana

Binomial name
- Prunus caroliniana (Mill.) Aiton
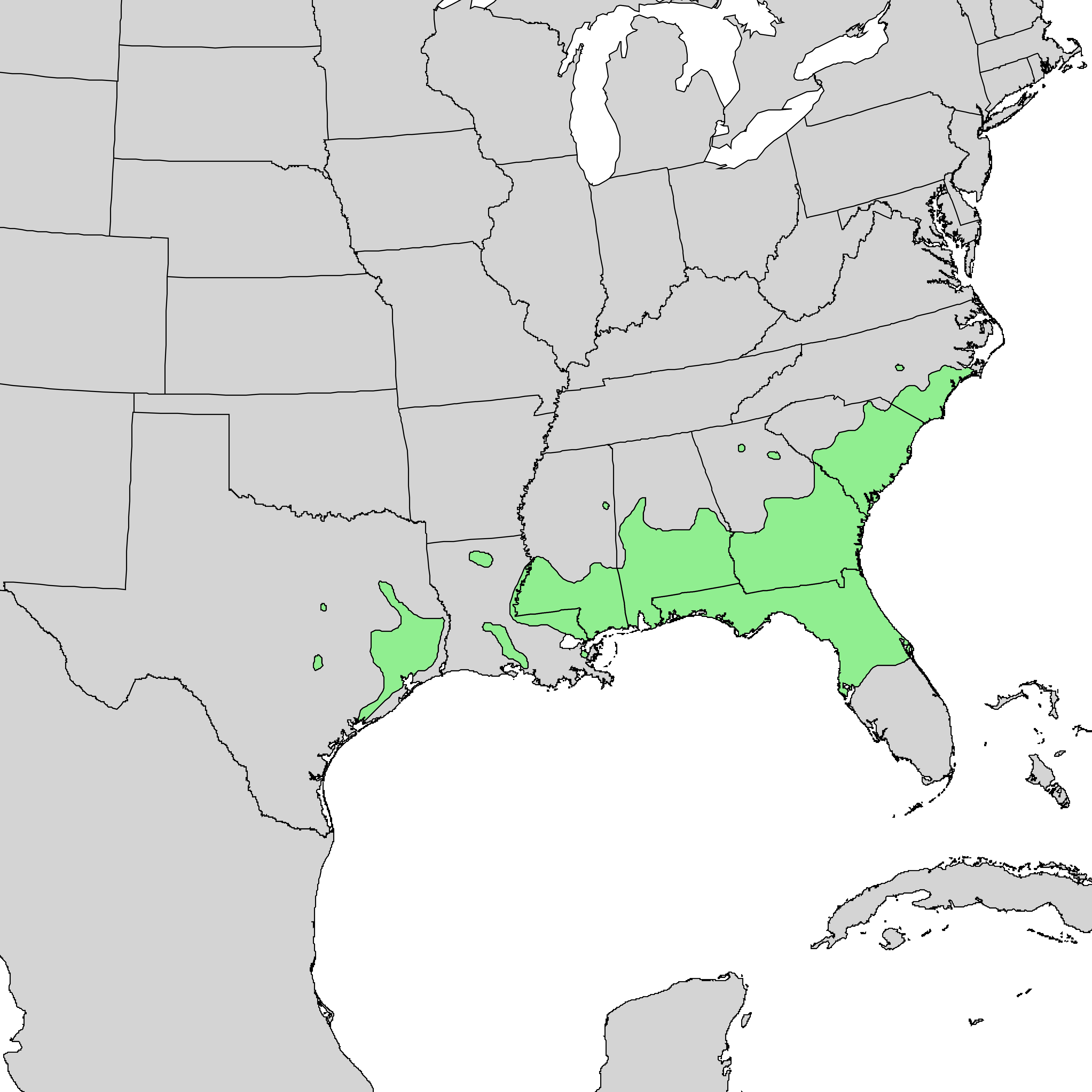
- Natural range of Prunus caroliniana

Synonyms
- Padus caroliniana Mill.; Bumelia serrata Pursh; Chimanthus amygdalina Raf.; Laurocerasus caroliniana (Mill.) M.Roem.; Lauro-cerasus caroliniana (Mill.) M.Roem.; Prunus carolina Du Roi; Prunus lusitanica Walter; Prunus serratifolia Marsh.

= Prunus caroliniana =

Species of tree

Prunus caroliniana, known as the Carolina laurelcherry, Carolina cherry laurel, Carolina cherry, or cherry laurel, is a North American species of Prunus that forms a small evergreen tree.

== Description ==
Prunus caroliniana is a small to medium-sized evergreen tree that grows to approximately 5–13 meters (16–43 feet) tall, with a spread of about 6–9 m (20–30 ft). The leaves are dark green, alternate, shiny, leathery, elliptic to oblanceolate, 5–12 centimeters (2–4 1/2 inches) long, usually with an entire (smooth) margin, but occasionally serrulate (having subtle serrations), and with cuneate bases. The leaves of reproductively mature trees have entire margins, whereas those of immature trees often have subtle serrations. The twigs are red to grayish brown, slender, and glabrous. When crushed, the leaves and green twigs emit a fragrance described as resembling maraschino cherries or almond extract.

Fragrant white to cream-colored flowers are produced in racemes (stalked bunches) 5–8 cm (2–3 in) long in the late winter to early spring (February–April). The fruits are tiny black cherries about 1 cm (1/2 in) in diameter, which persist through winter and are primarily consumed by birds.

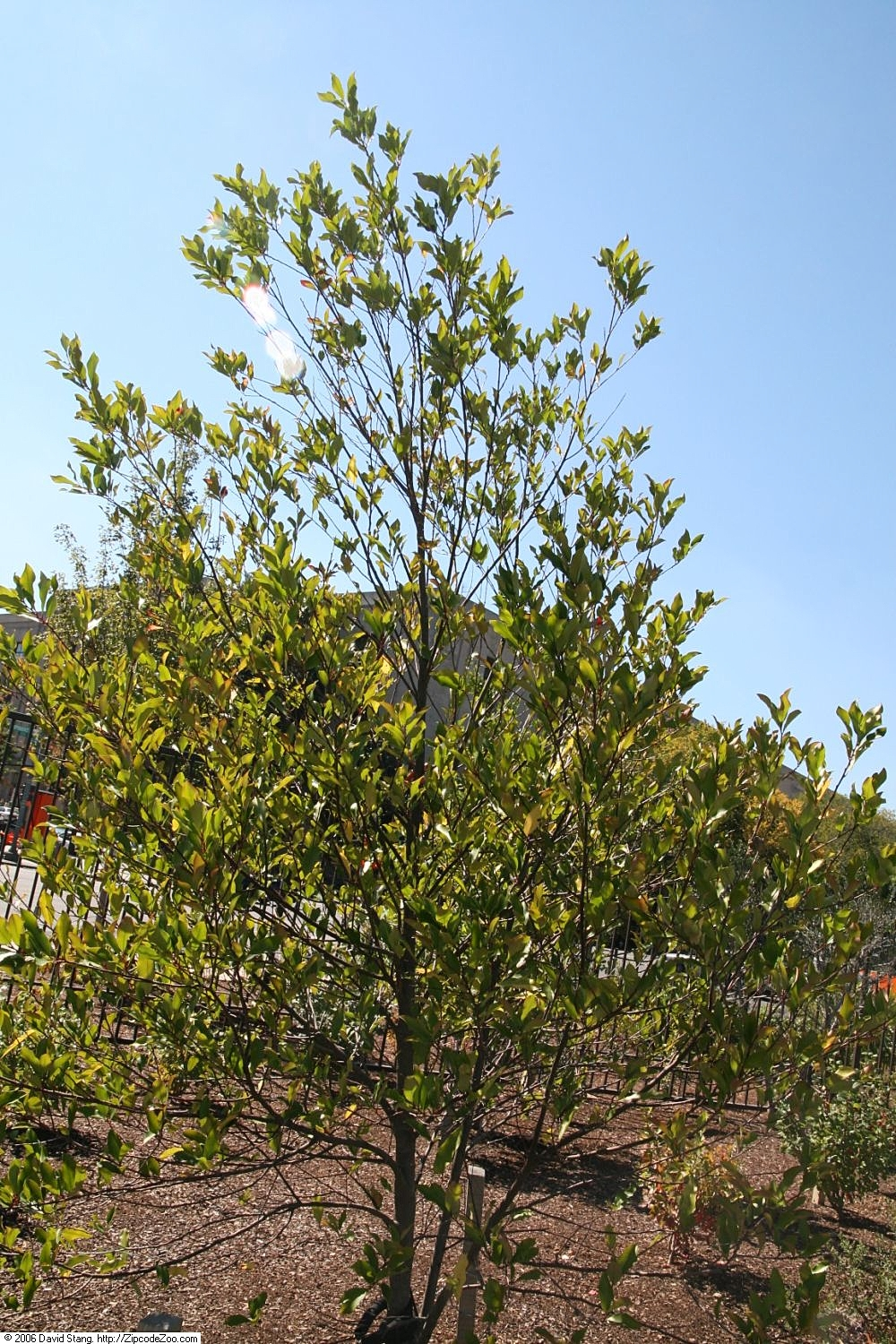
Habit

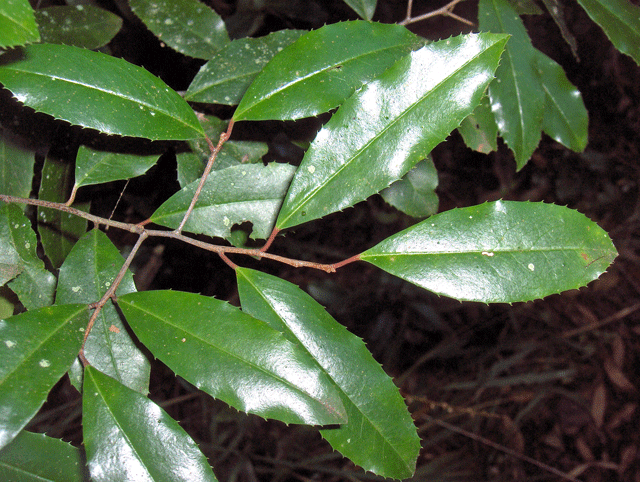
Leaves

== Distribution and habitat ==
The species is native to the lowlands of Southeastern United States, from North Carolina south to Florida and westward to central Texas. The species also has escaped into the wild in a few places in California.

== Ecology ==
The tree is a host plant for coral hairstreak, eastern tiger swallowtail, red-spotted purple, spring azures, summer azures, and viceroy butterflies where adult butterflies nectar from the spring flowers while the fruits are eaten by songbirds, wild turkeys, quail, raccoons, foxes, and small mammals.

== Cultivation ==
The species has long been an ornamental tree and landscape hedge shrub in gardens in many parts of the Atlantic states of the US. The tree is considered hardy in USDA zones 7B through 10A. It is often used in areas where a tough broadleaved evergreen tree is needed of modest size. It prefers full sun and well-drained, acidic soil, often developing chlorosis if grown in overly alkaline soil. It is known to grow to elevations of 152 m (500 ft).

=== Cultivars ===
Cultivated varieties include:

- Prunus caroliniana 'Compacta' grows to about half the usual height and width of the species.
- Prunus caroliniana 'Cherry Ruffles' has wavy/ruffled leaf margins.

== Toxicity ==
The leaves and branches contain high amounts of cyanogenic glycosides that break down into hydrogen cyanide when damaged, making it a potential toxic hazard to grazing livestock and children. Due to this, it is considered highly deer-resistant.
