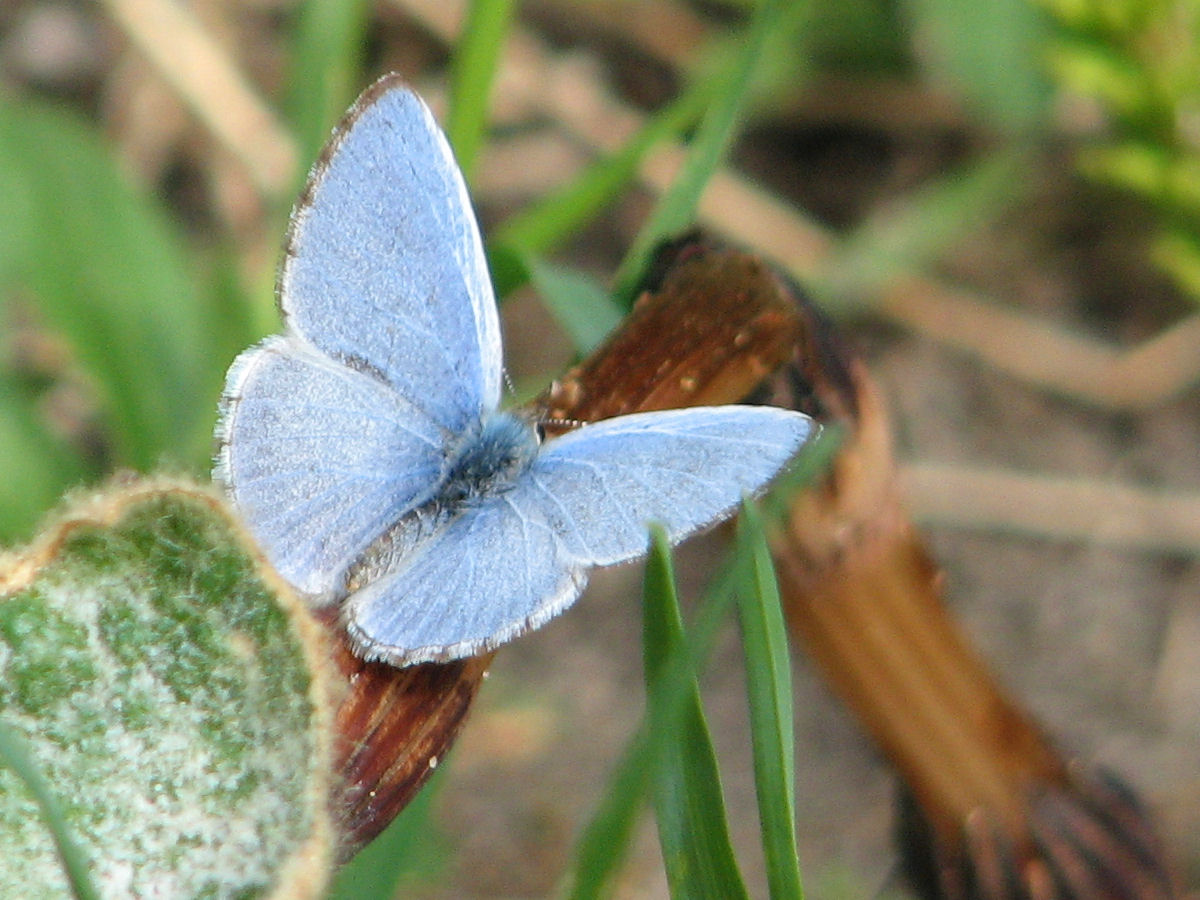
- Male, Ottawa, Ontario, Canada
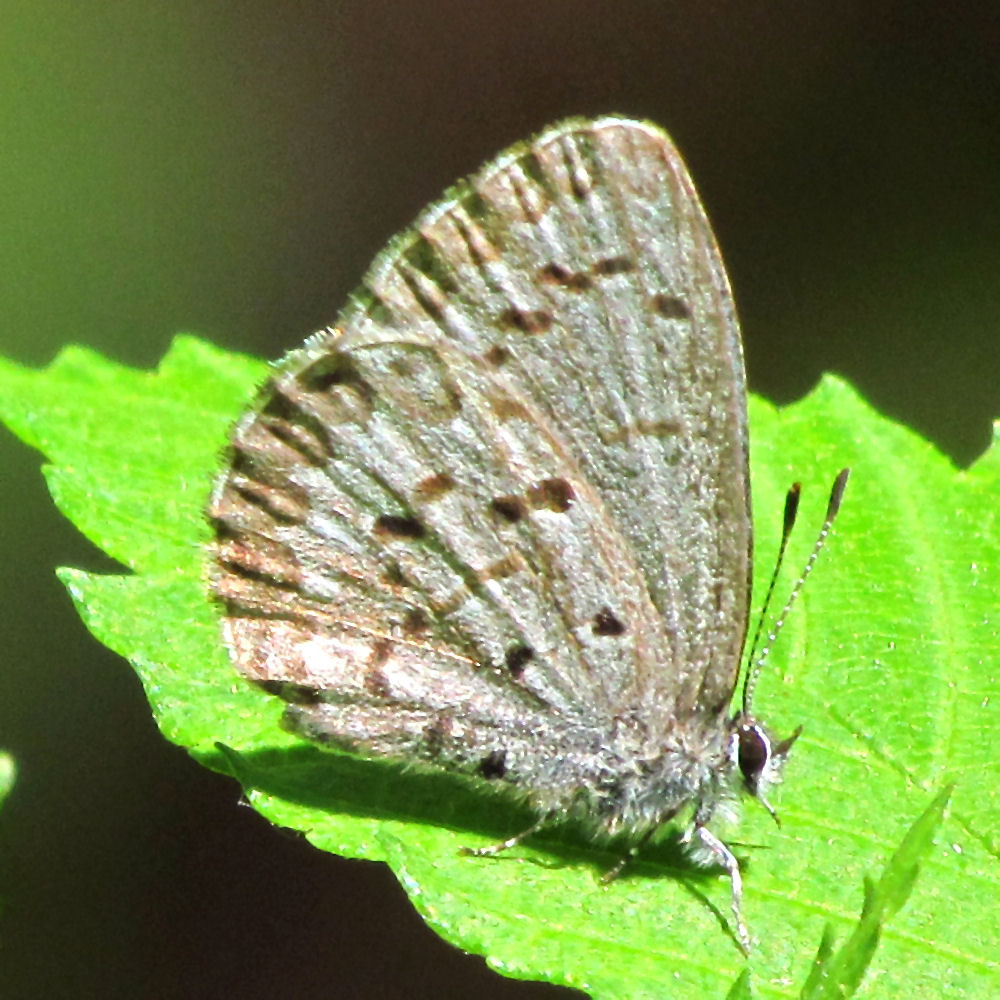
- Mer Bleue Conservation Area, Ottawa, Ontario, Canada

Conservation status
- Secure (NatureServe)

Scientific classification
- Kingdom: Animalia
- Phylum: Arthropoda
- Clade: Pancrustacea
- Class: Insecta
- Order: Lepidoptera
- Family: Lycaenidae
- Genus: Celastrina
- Species: C. lucia

Binomial name
- Celastrina lucia (Kirby, 1837)

Subspecies
- C. l. lucia; C. l. lumarco Scott, 2006

Synonyms
- Lycaena lucia Kirby, 1837; Lycaena marginata Edwards, 1883; Celastrina fumida (Scudder, 1889); Celastrina pseudora (Scudder, 1889); Celastrina brunnea Tutt, 1908; Celastrina subtusjuncta Tutt, 1908; Celastrina inaequalis Tutt, 1908; Celastrina ladon lucia

= Celastrina lucia =

Species of butterfly

Celastrina lucia, the lucia azure, northern azure, eastern spring azure or northern spring azure, is a species of butterfly of the family Lycaenidae. It is found eastern North America, ranging from the Maritimes south through the Appalachian Mountains to West Virginia.

The wingspan is between 22–35 mm. Adults are sexually dimorphic. They are on wing from April to July.

The larvae feed on Vaccinium species, including V. pallidum.

== Taxonomy ==
Until the early 1990s, most North American azures were thought to be a single species, Celastrina ladon. More recently, research has revealed that there are many different species of azures, including C. lucia, which had been treated as a subspecies of C. ladon.

== Similar species ==
- Cherry gall azure (C. serotina)
- Holly azure (C. idella)
- Spring azure (C. ladon)
- Summer azure (C. neglecta)

== Gallery ==
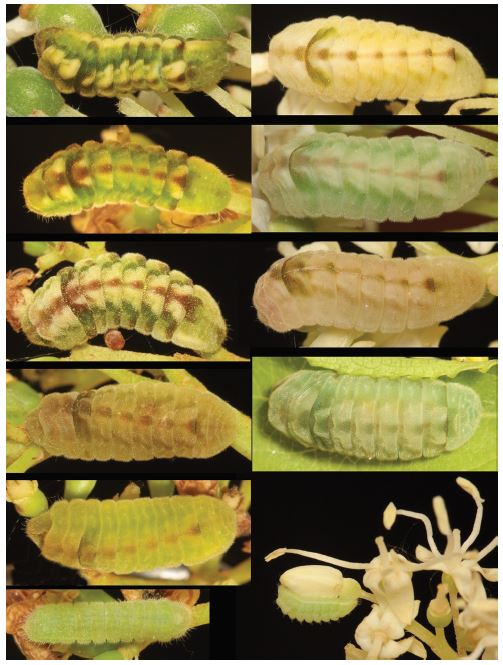
Variation in larval colour pattern of C. lucia found on Viburnum lentago (left column) and Cornus alternifolia (right column)
