= Celastrina iryna =

Scientific classification
- Kingdom: Animalia
- Phylum: Arthropoda
- Class: Insecta
- Order: Lepidoptera
- Family: Lycaenidae
- Genus: Celastrina
- Species: C. iryna

Binomial name
- Celastrina iryna Pavulaan, 2025

Species of butterfly

Celastrina iryna, or Iryna's azure, is a butterfly species in the family Lycaenidae, named in honor of Iryna Zarutska, who was killed in 2025. Thought to be a hybrid species, the males differ from Celastrina neglecta by their absence of androconia and presence of elongated wing scales, while the females have a nearly immaculate white underside.

The butterfly has been observed in South Carolina's Aiken, Barnwell, Dorchester, Jasper, and Orangeburg counties, as well as in Georgia, northern Florida and Mississippi. The Aiken flight was observed in April, however the species is thought to be multivoltine as it has been observed from April to August in Georgia, for example.

== History ==
Celastrina iryna was originally discovered in the Aiken and Barnwell counties of South Carolina by Ronald Gatrelle in 1985. After Gatrelle's death, Harry Pavulaan inherited his collection and formally described the butterfly in 2025 after further field studies in 2018 and 2019. Pavulaan named the species Celastrina iryna, rather than Celastrina carolina, after the Ukrainian refugee to help bring awareness to her case.
