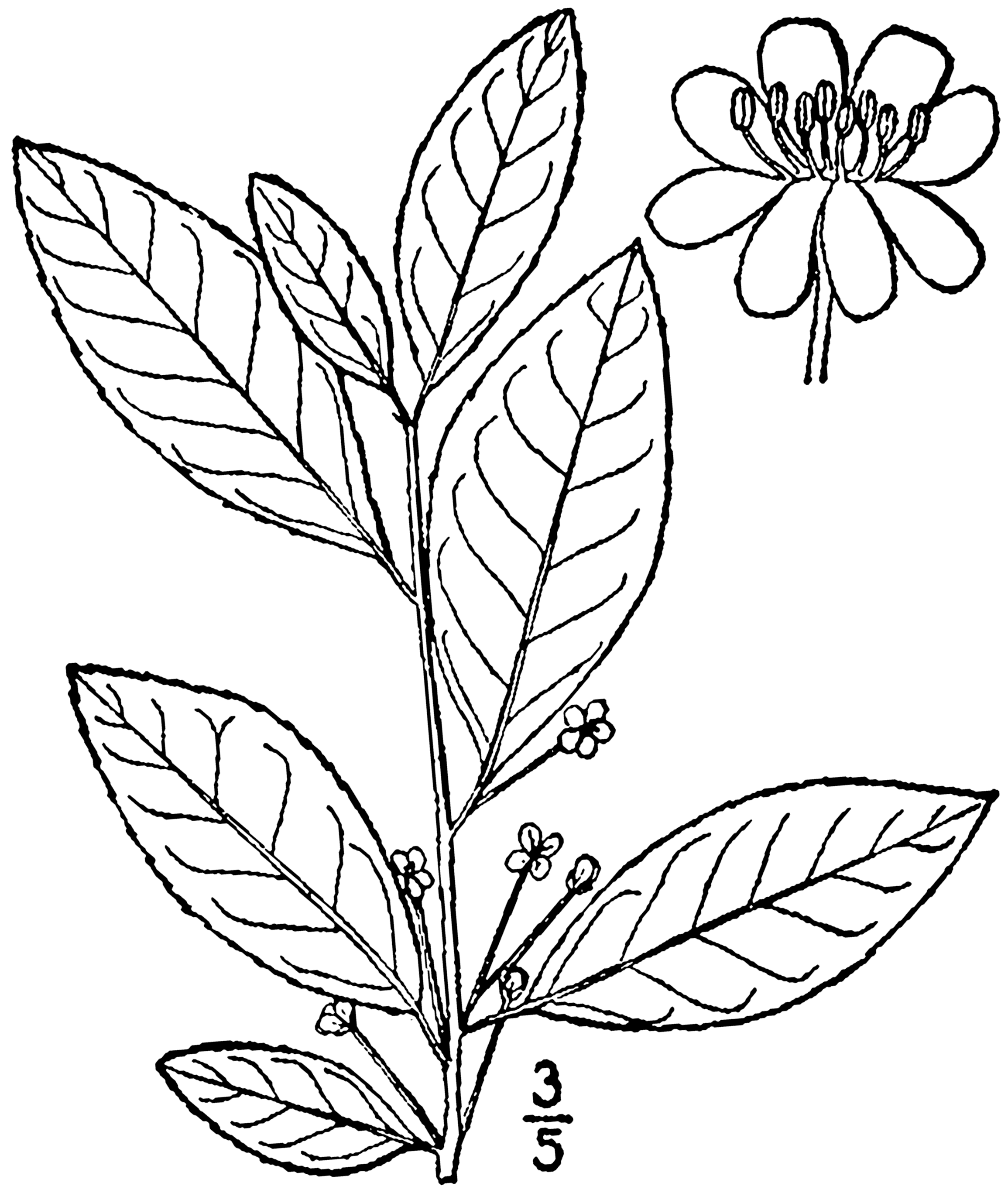

Scientific classification
- Kingdom: Plantae
- Clade: Tracheophytes
- Clade: Angiosperms
- Clade: Eudicots
- Clade: Asterids
- Order: Aquifoliales
- Family: Aquifoliaceae
- Genus: Ilex
- Species: I. laevigata

Binomial name
- Ilex laevigata (Pursh) A.Gray

= Ilex laevigata =

Species of holly

Ilex laevigata (Pursh) A. Gray, commonly referred to as smooth winterberry, is a plant species in the Aquifoliaceae (holly family). It is native to the eastern United States, ranging from coastal areas of Maine to Georgia.

This deciduous species grows in naturally moist areas, such as seepage swamps, wet flatwoods, and nonriverine swamps. It is dioecious, with separate male and female flowers occurring on separate plants, like other hollies. It is closely related to and can occur alongside the lookalike species Ilex verticillata, the winterberry holly. The upper surface of the leaves of Ilex laevigata are smooth with finely toothed margins, their flower sepals occur without cilia (hairs) on their margins, the male flowers are borne on longer pedicels than the female flowers, and the autumn fruits, once ripened in autumn and winter, are a scarlet or orange-red rather than the deep red of other deciduous hollies.

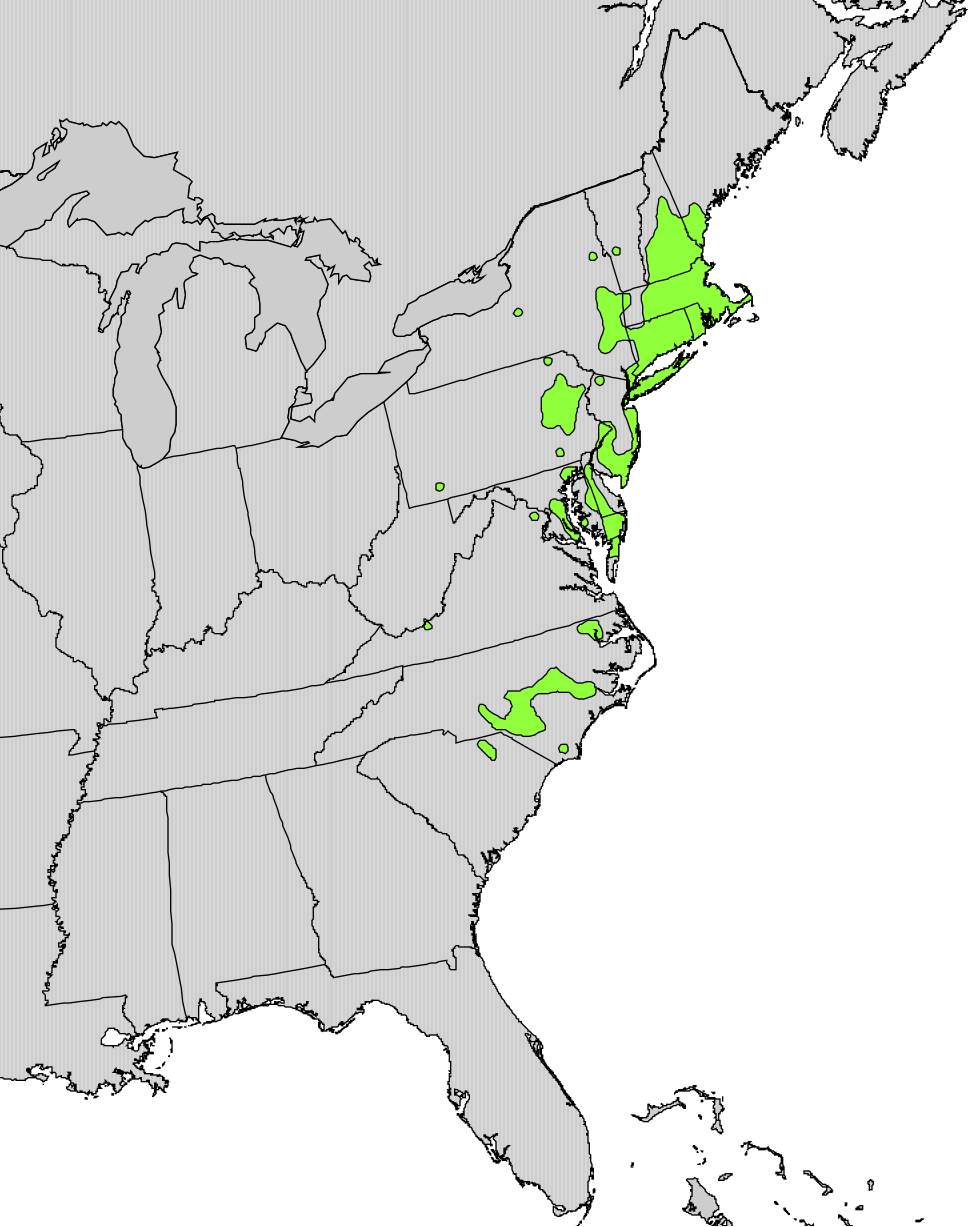
Natural range
