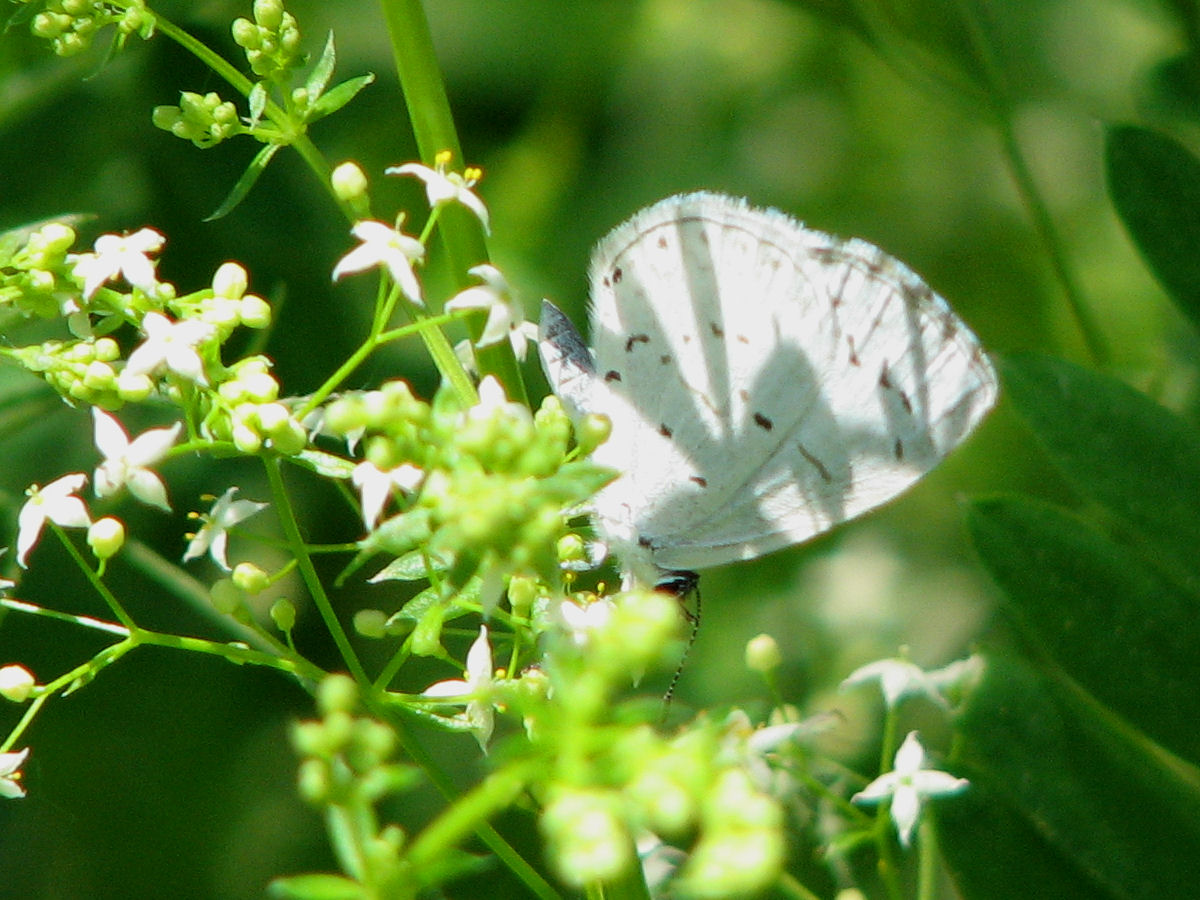
- Ottawa, Ontario

Scientific classification
- Domain: Eukaryota
- Kingdom: Animalia
- Phylum: Arthropoda
- Class: Insecta
- Order: Lepidoptera
- Family: Lycaenidae
- Genus: Celastrina
- Species: C. serotina

Binomial name
- Celastrina serotina (Pavulaan and Wright, 2005)

= Celastrina serotina =

Cherry gall azure

Species of butterfly

Celastrina serotina, the cherry gall azure, is a butterfly of the family Lycaenidae. It is found across North America as far north as the treeline. Its flight time is between mid-May and mid-June in eastern Ontario after the spring azure and before the summer azure. The larva has been reported to feed on galls of eriophyid mites (e. g. Eriophyes cerasicrumena) and apparently also on the mites themselves, making them one of the rare species of carnivorous Lepidoptera. It is commonly found around woodland roads of upland mixed deciduous hardwood forests which are surrounded by wetlands.

== Similar species ==
- Spring azure (C. ladon)
- Summer azure (C. neglecta)
- Holly azure (C. idella)
- Lucia azure (C. lucia)
