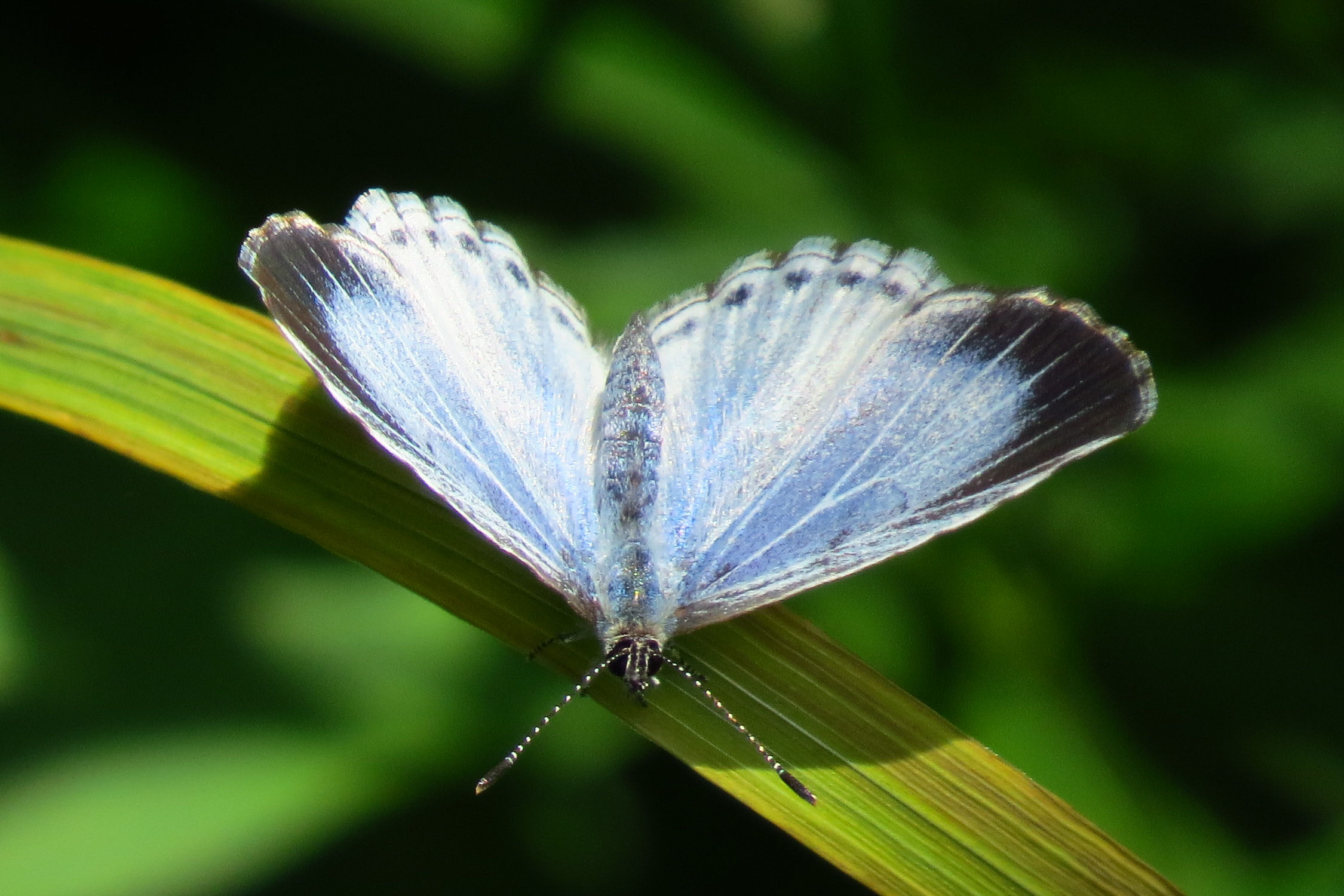
- Female, upperside
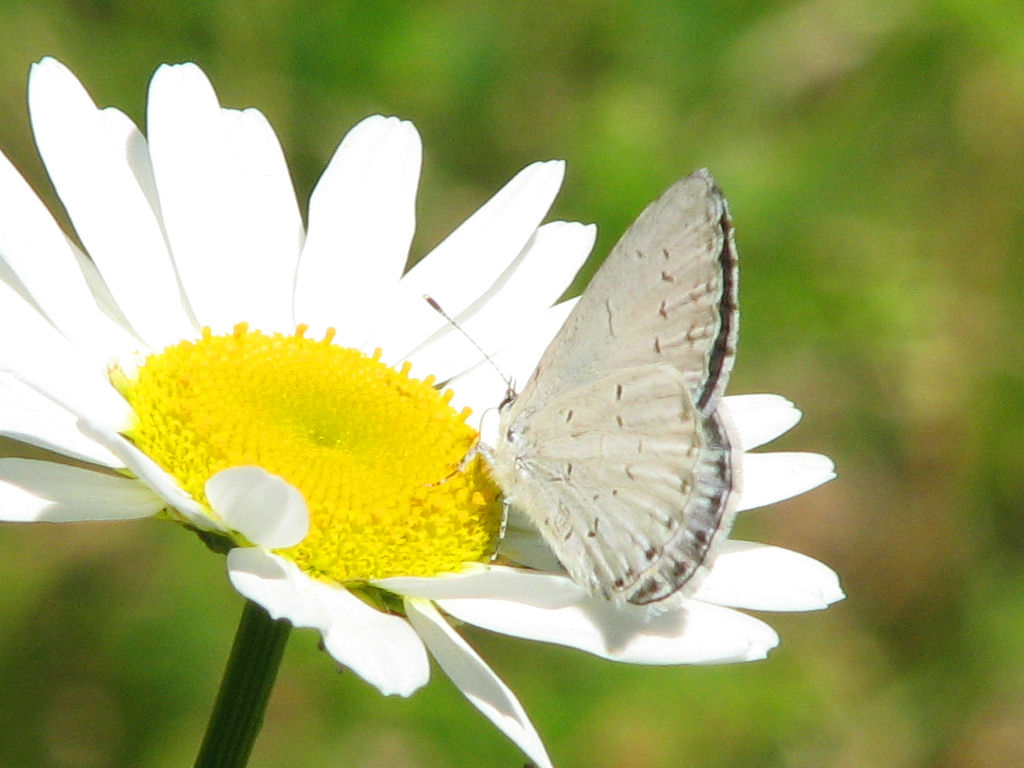
- C. n. neglecta, Ottawa, Ontario, Canada

Conservation status
- Secure (NatureServe)

Scientific classification
- Kingdom: Animalia
- Phylum: Arthropoda
- Clade: Pancrustacea
- Class: Insecta
- Order: Lepidoptera
- Family: Lycaenidae
- Genus: Celastrina
- Species: C. neglecta

Binomial name
- Celastrina neglecta (W.H. Edwards, 1862)

= Celastrina neglecta =

Species of butterfly

Celastrina neglecta, the summer azure, is a butterfly of the family Lycaenidae. It is found in North America. Layberry, Hall, and Lafontaine, in The Butterflies of Canada, describe the species:

The upper surface is pale blue with an extensive dusting of white scales, especially on the hindwing. In some females the blue is almost entirely replaced by white with a small amount of blue near the wing bases. Females have a broad blackish-grey band on the outer third and costa of the forewing. The underside is chalky white to pale grey with tiny dark grey spots and a zigzagged submarginal line on the hindwing.

Wingspan is 23 to 29 mm (0.91 to 1.14 in).

Known host plants for the caterpillars include New Jersey tea, dogwoods, and meadowsweet. Adults nectar from many plants including vetch, yarrow, meadowsweet, rough-fruited cinquefoil, Queen Anne's lace, wild oregano (Origanum vulgare), narrow-leaved mountain mint, Joe-pye weed, and goldenrods.

The summer azure occurs across most of eastern and central United States as well as southern Canada from Nova Scotia to southern Saskatchewan. Adults fly from mid-June until early October with two or three generations in the south.

The taxonomic status of this butterfly, originally described as Lycaena neglecta Edwards, 1862, has been in flux over the years. It was at one time treated as a synonym of Celastrina argiolus lucia (Lycaena lucia Kirby, 1837).

== Similar species ==
- Spring azure (C. ladon)
- Cherry gall azure (C. serotina)
- Holly azure (C. idella)
- Lucia azure (C. lucia)
- Iryna's azure (C. iryna)
