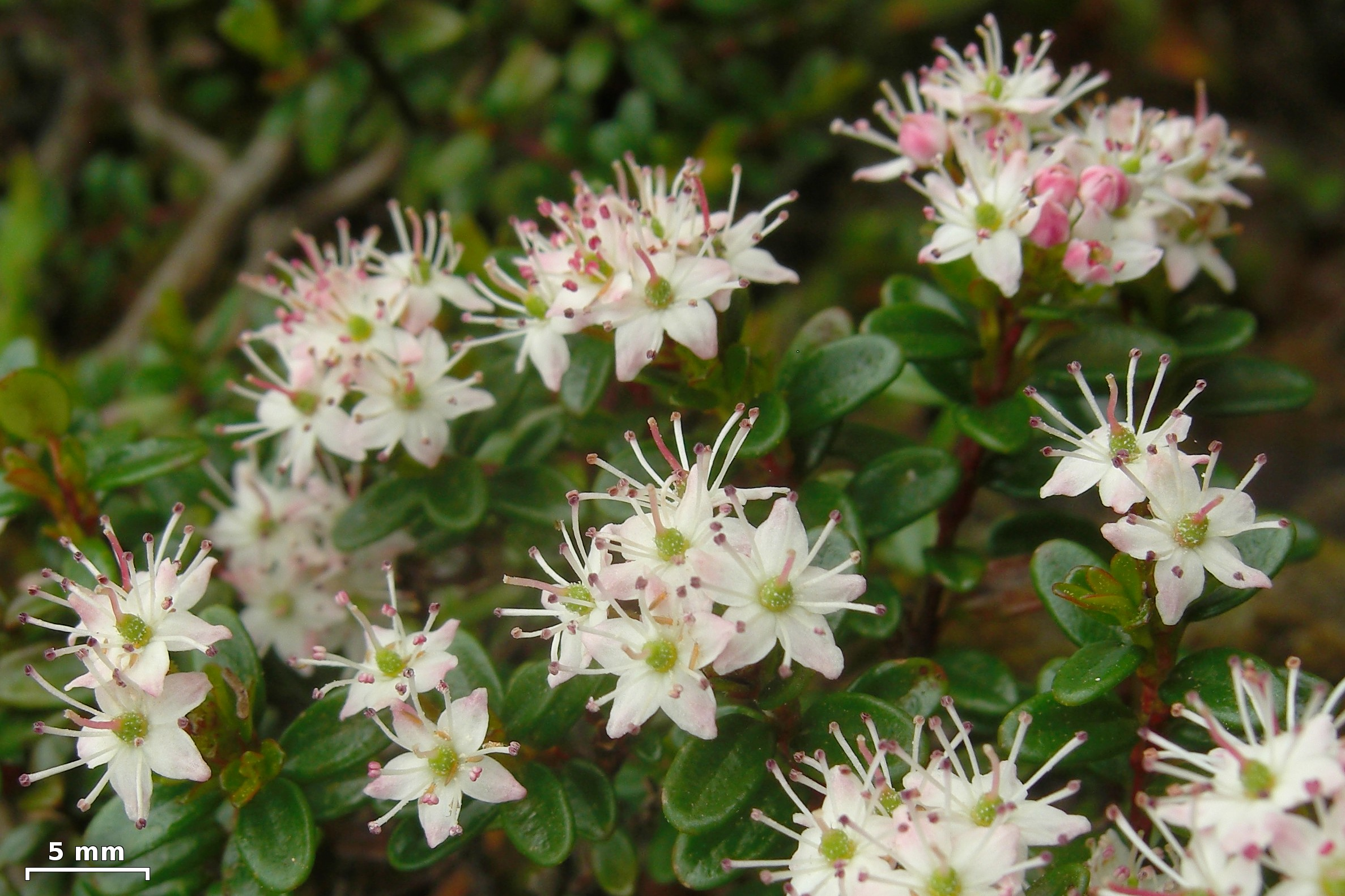

Conservation status
- Apparently Secure (NatureServe)

Scientific classification
- Kingdom: Plantae
- Clade: Tracheophytes
- Clade: Angiosperms
- Clade: Eudicots
- Clade: Asterids
- Order: Ericales
- Family: Ericaceae
- Genus: Kalmia
- Species: K. buxifolia

Binomial name
- Kalmia buxifolia (Bergius) Gift & Kron

Synonyms
- Leiophyllum buxifolium

= Kalmia buxifolia =

Species of flowering plant

Kalmia buxifolia is a species of flowering plant in the family Ericaceae known by the common name sandmyrtle, or sand-myrtle. It is native to the mid-Atlantic and southeastern United States, where it has a disjunct distribution, occurring in three separate areas. It is known from the Pine Barrens of New Jersey, the Coastal Plain of the Carolinas, and the southeastern Blue Ridge Mountains.

This species is sometimes called Leiophyllum buxifolium, the only member of the monotypic genus Leiophyllum. Genetic analysis supports its inclusion in genus Kalmia.

This species is quite variable in appearance. It is a shrub growing 10 centimeters to one meter in height. The leaves may be alternately or oppositely arranged on the stems. They are oval to lance-shaped and up to 1.4 centimeters long. The inflorescence is a raceme or umbel of up to 18 flowers with white or light pink petals. The fruit is a capsule a few millimeters long.

This species grows in a variety of habitat types in its fragmented range, including sandy plains in the Carolinas and rocky mountain woods.

The Latin specific epithet buxifolia means "box-leaved", referring to species in the genus Buxus.

The species and the cultivar 'Maryfield' have received the Royal Horticultural Society's Award of Garden Merit.
