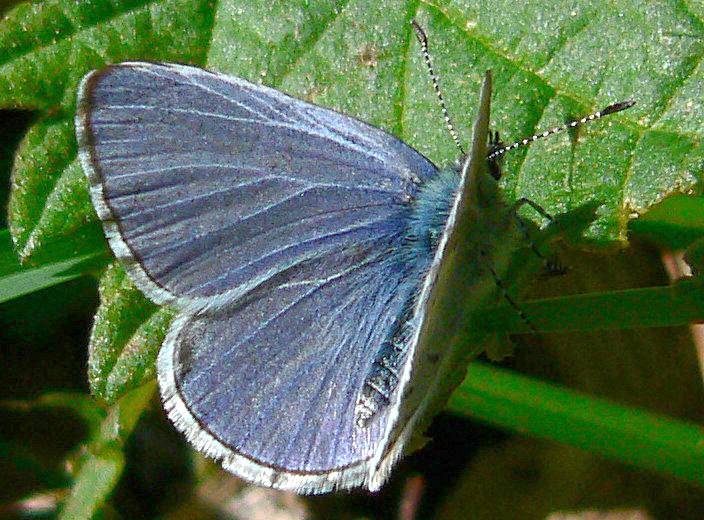
- Male, Cougar Mountain Regional Wildland Park, Washington, United States
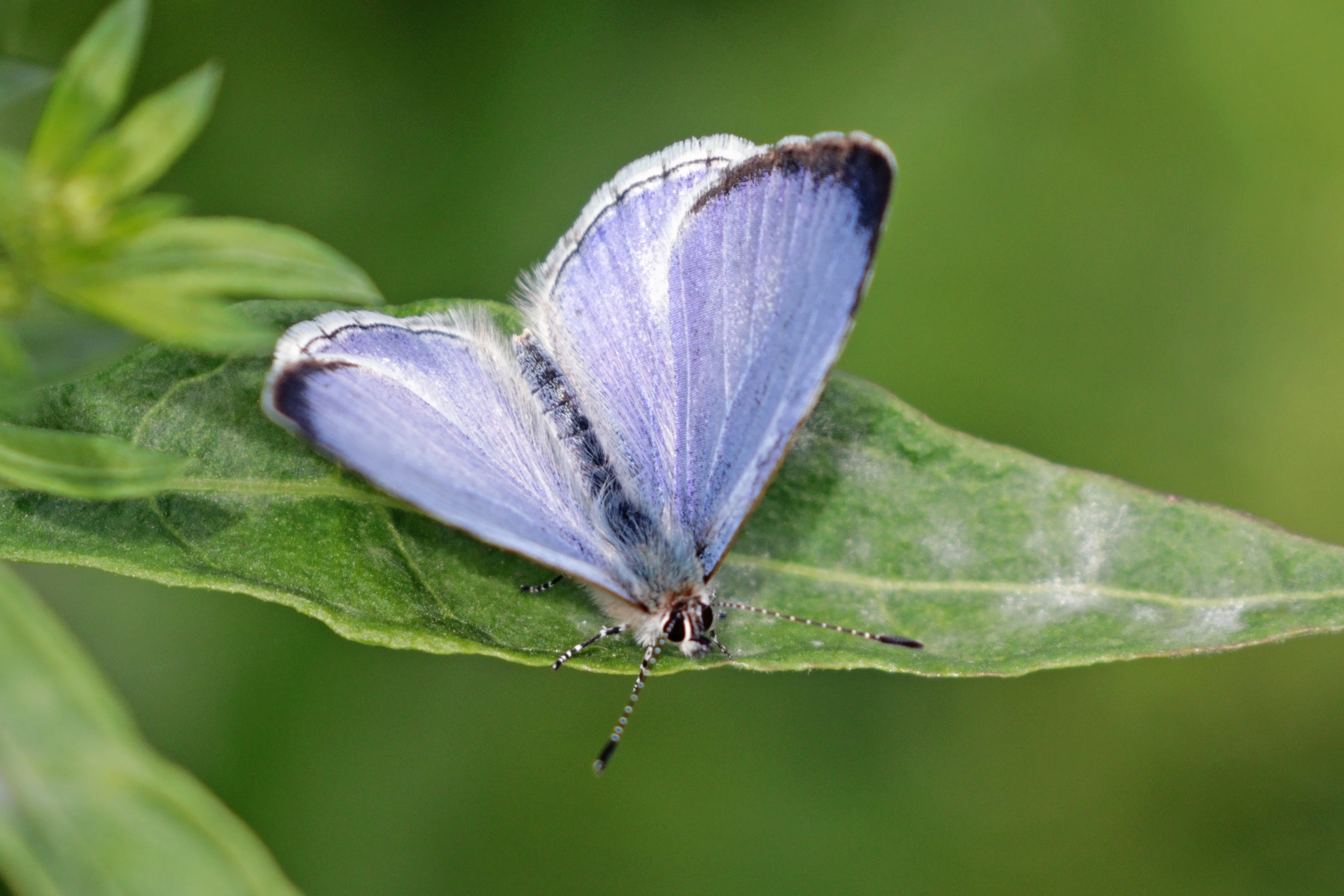
- Female, Panama

Conservation status
- Apparently Secure (NatureServe)

Scientific classification
- Domain: Eukaryota
- Kingdom: Animalia
- Phylum: Arthropoda
- Class: Insecta
- Order: Lepidoptera
- Family: Lycaenidae
- Genus: Celastrina
- Species: C. ladon

Binomial name
- Celastrina ladon (Cramer, 1780)

= Celastrina ladon =

Spring azure

Species of butterfly

Celastrina ladon, the spring azure or echo blue, is a butterfly of the family Lycaenidae. It is found in North America from Alaska and Canada south of the tundra, through most of the United States except the Texas coast, southern plain and peninsula Florida; south in the mountains to Colombia, also on Molokai island, Hawaii.

Since the publication of a monograph on the Lycaenopsis group of lycaenid genera in 1983 by Eliot & Kawazoe, C. ladon has been considered by some taxonomic authorities to be a subspecies of C. argiolus (Linnaeus, 1758). Other authorities still consider C. ladon and related species C. neglecta and C. serotina to be "full" species.

Its wingspan is 22–35 millimetres (0.87–1.38 in). The metallic blue wings have a black margin in females. The undersides of the wings are white with speckles.

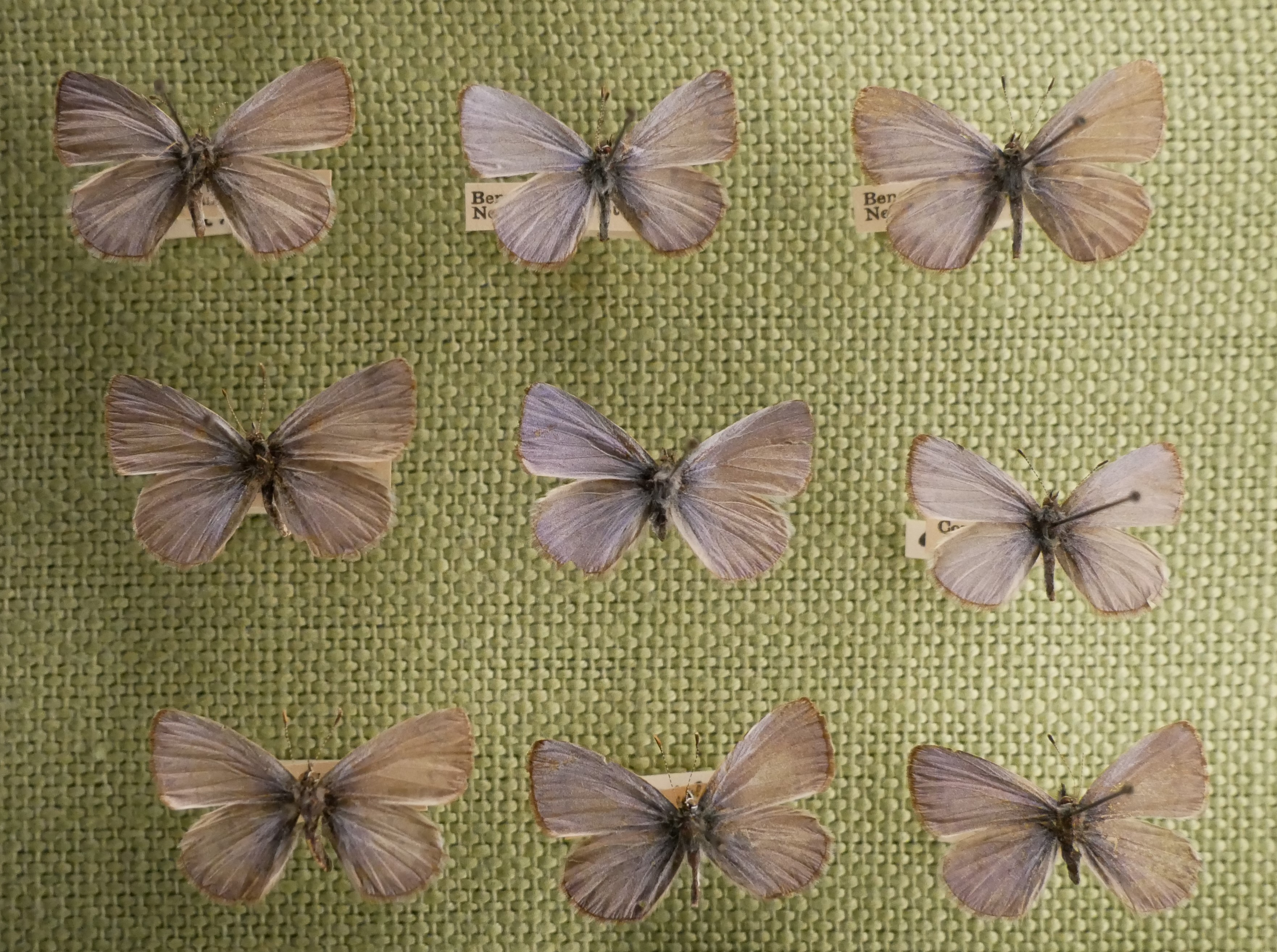
Museum specimens

== Similar species ==
- Cherry gall azure (C. serotina)
- Holly azure (C. idella)
- Lucia azure (C. lucia)
- Summer azure (C. neglecta)
