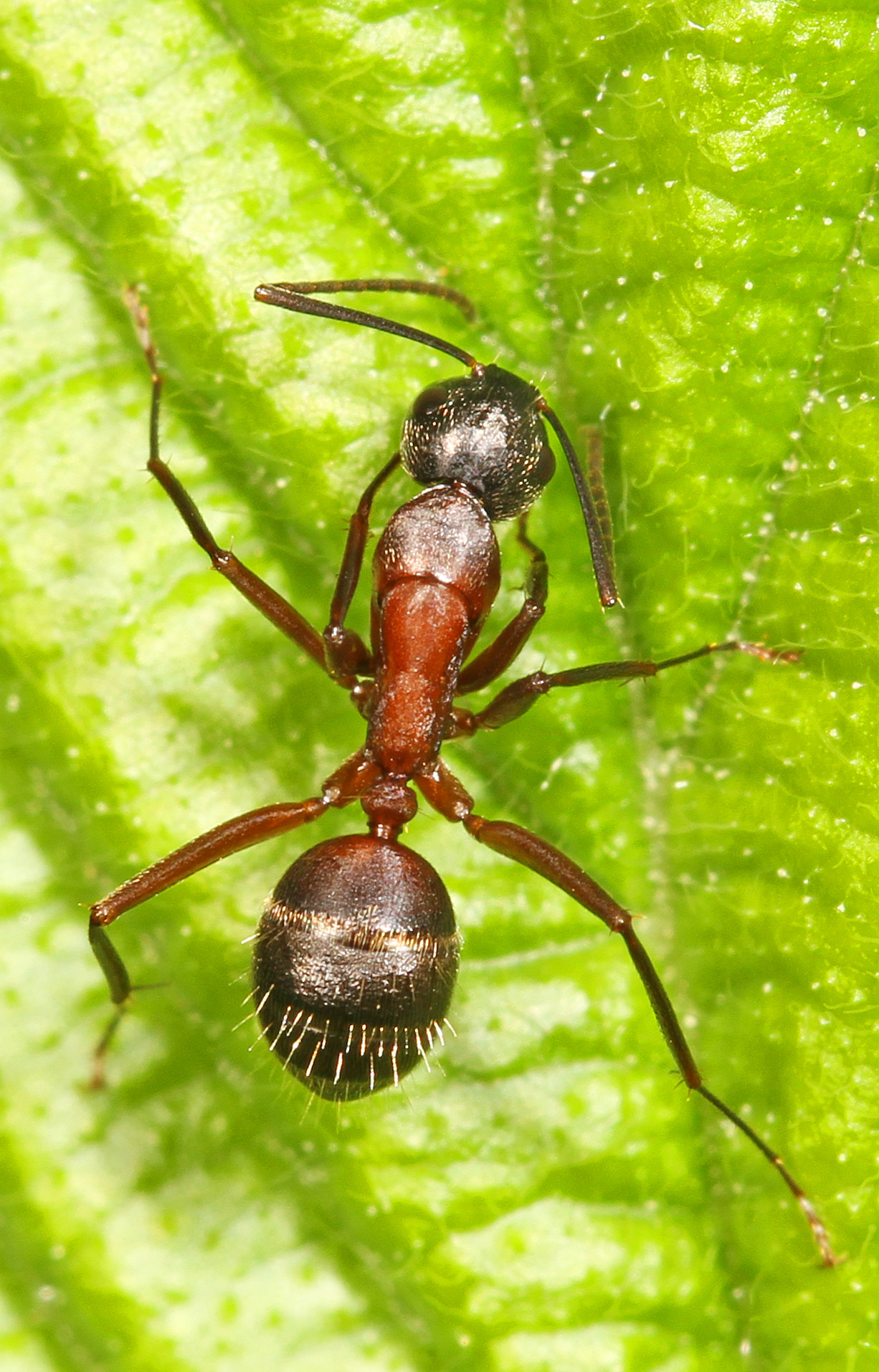

Scientific classification
- Kingdom: Animalia
- Phylum: Arthropoda
- Clade: Pancrustacea
- Class: Insecta
- Order: Hymenoptera
- Family: Formicidae
- Subfamily: Formicinae
- Genus: Camponotus
- Subgenus: Camponotus
- Species: C. chromaiodes

Binomial name
- Camponotus chromaiodes Bolton, 1995

= Camponotus chromaiodes =

Red carpenter ant

Camponotus chromaiodes, known generally as, the ferruginous carpenter ant or red carpenter ant, is a species of carpenter ant native to the eastern United States, Nebraska, Kansas, and possibly California. Acetobacteraceae are found in the guts of workers in this species.

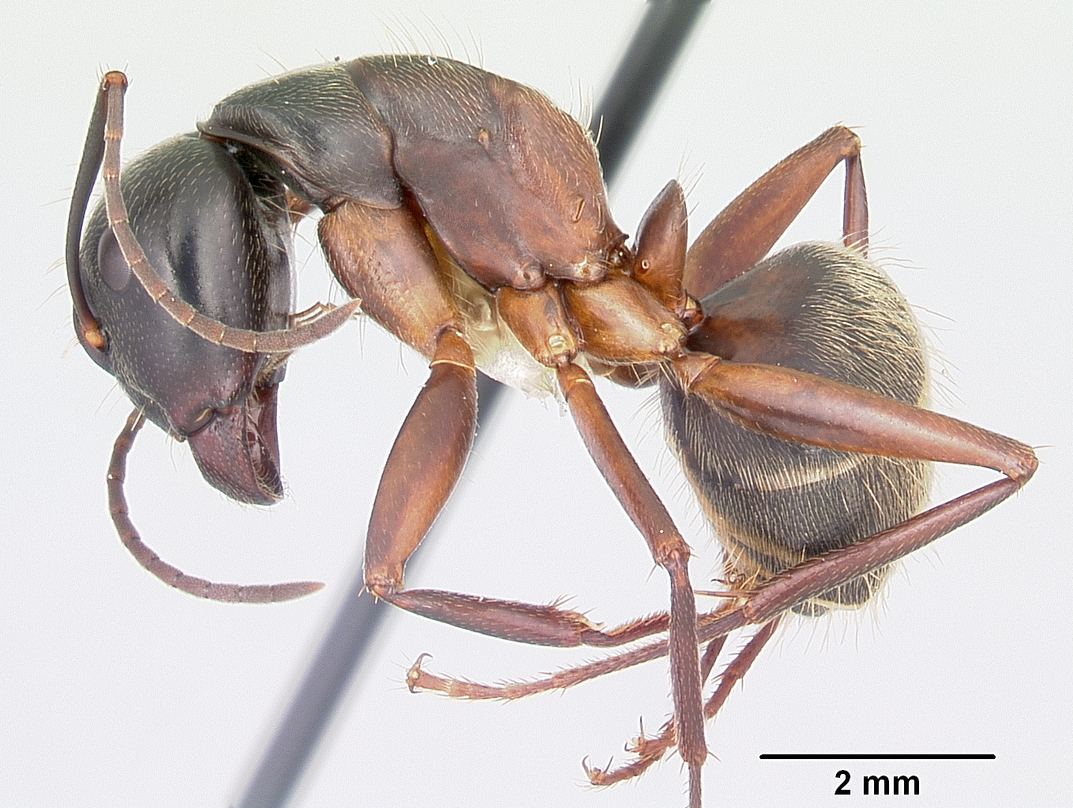
antweb.org specimen
