= Inkberry =

Inkberry is a common name for several unrelated plants:

- Any plant in the genus Phytolacca (pokeweeds)
  - Especially Phytolacca americana (American pokeweed)
- Dianella nigra (turutu in Māori, New Zealand blueberry)
- Ilex glabra (evergreen winterberry)
- Ilex verticillata (American winterberry)
- Scaevola plumieri (beachberry), species of Scaevola (plant)
- Cestrum diurnum (day-blooming jasmine), sometimes referred to as "Chinese inkberry"
