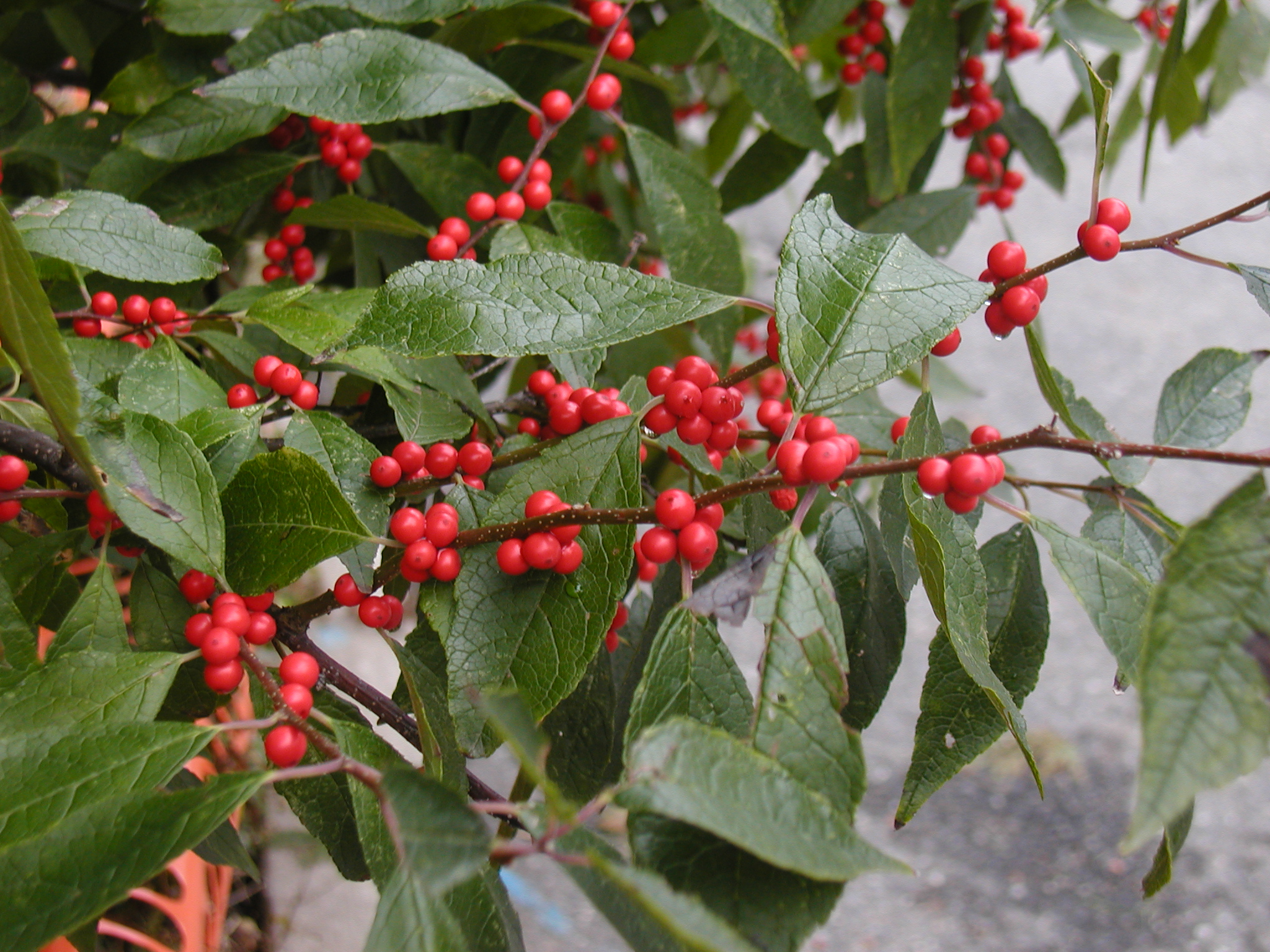

Conservation status
- Least Concern (IUCN 3.1)

- Secure (NatureServe)

Scientific classification
- Kingdom: Plantae
- Clade: Tracheophytes
- Clade: Angiosperms
- Clade: Eudicots
- Clade: Asterids
- Order: Aquifoliales
- Family: Aquifoliaceae
- Genus: Ilex
- Species: I. verticillata

Binomial name
- Ilex verticillata (L.) A.Gray, 1856
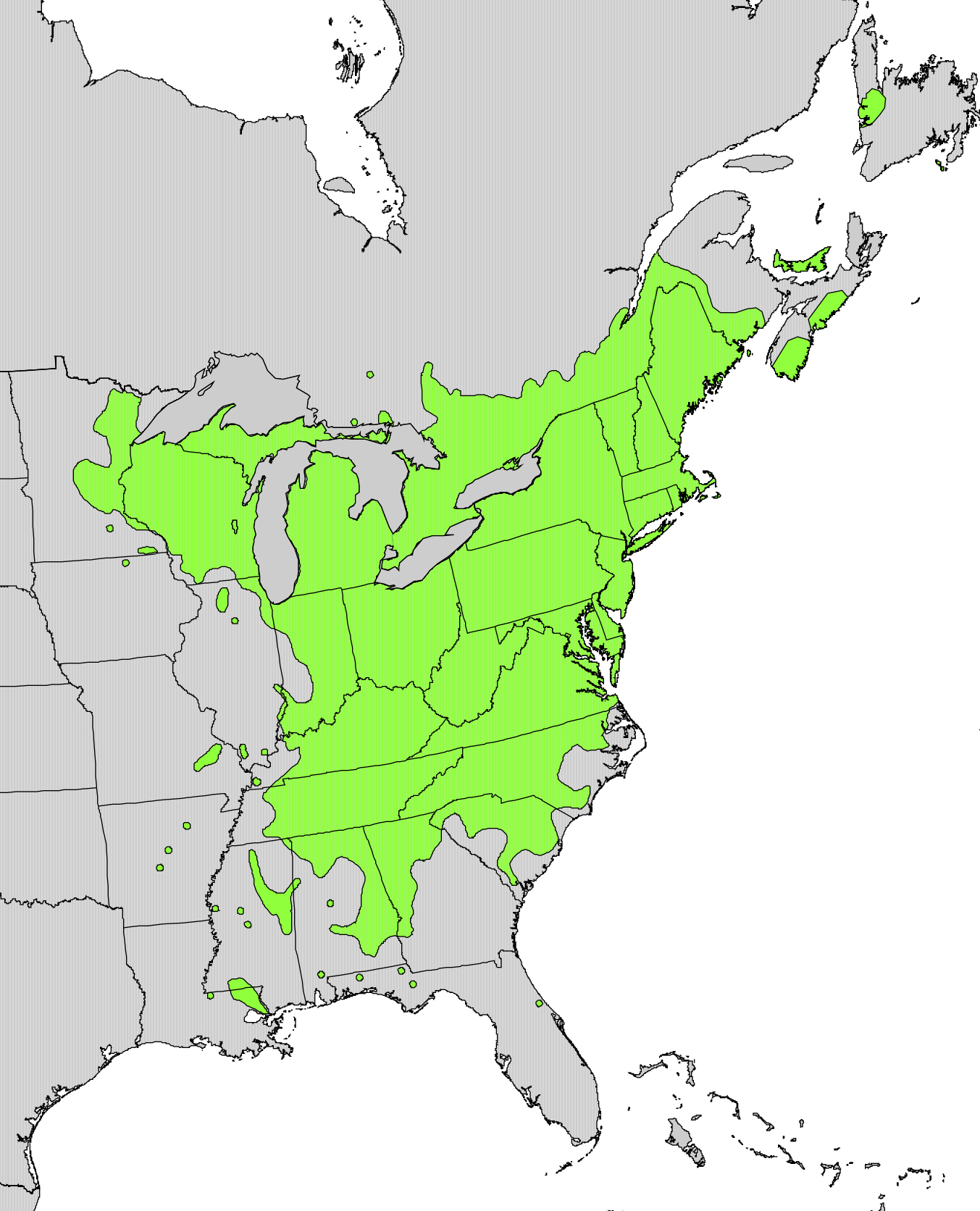
- Natural range

= Ilex verticillata =

Species of holly

Ilex verticillata, the winterberry, is a species of holly native to eastern North America in the United States and southeast Canada, from Newfoundland west to Ontario and Minnesota, and south to Alabama.

Other names that have been used include black alder, Canada holly, coralberry, fever bush, Michigan holly, or winterberry holly.

The species occurs particularly in wetland habitats, but also on dry sand dunes and grassland. The berries are an important food resource for some species of bird, among them the American robin.

== Description ==
Ilex verticillata is a shrub growing to 1–5 m (3–16 ft) tall. It is one of a number of hollies which are deciduous, losing their leaves in the fall. In wet sites, it will spread to form a dense thicket, while in dry soil it remains a tight shrub. The leaves are glossy green, 3.5–9 cm (1 3/8–3 1/2 in) long, 1.5–3.5 cm (5/8–1 3/8 in) broad, with a serrated margin and an acute apex. The flowers are small, 5 mm (0.20 in) in diameter, with five to eight white petals.

The fruit is a globose red drupe 6–8 mm (0.24–0.31 in) in diameter, which often persists on the branches long into the winter, giving the plant its English name. Like most hollies, it is dioecious, with separate male and female plants; the proximity of at least one male plant is required to pollenize the females in order to bear fruit.

== Cultivation and uses ==
=== Medicinal ===
The berries were used by Native Americans for medicinal purposes, the origin of the name "fever bush".

The seeds, leaves, bark and berries of the plant can cause nausea and low blood pressure if ingested.

=== Ornamental plant ===
Ilex verticillata – the American winterberry – is prized as an ornamental plant in gardens for the midwinter splash of bright color from densely packed berries, whose visibility is heightened by the loss of foliage; therefore it is popular even where other, evergreen hollies are also grown. The bare branches covered in berries are also popular for cutting and use in floral arrangements. In autumn/fall the leaves turn yellow, sometimes with tinges of red and orange.

It is easy to grow, with very few diseases or pests. Although wet acidic soils are optimal, the winterberry will grow well in the average garden. Numerous cultivars are available, differing in size and shape of the plant and color of the berry. At least one male plant must be planted in proximity to one or more females for them to bear fruit. Because both females and males come in early- and late-flowering varieties, males must be selected to have same timing as the females they are intended to pollinate.

== Selected cultivars ==
=== Female ===
- Ilex verticillata 'Winter Red' Fruit is orange-red
- Ilex verticillata 'Afterglow' Fruit is orange-red
- Ilex verticillata 'Red Sprite' Large, red fruit
- Ilex verticillata 'Spravy' "Berry Heavy" Fruit is orange-red
- Ilex verticillata 'Spriber' "Berry Nice" Bright red fruit
- Ilex verticillata 'Winter Gold' Fruit is orange.

=== Male (pollinator; no fruit) ===
- Ilex verticillata 'Southern Gentleman'
- Ilex verticillata 'Jim Dandy'

== Gallery ==
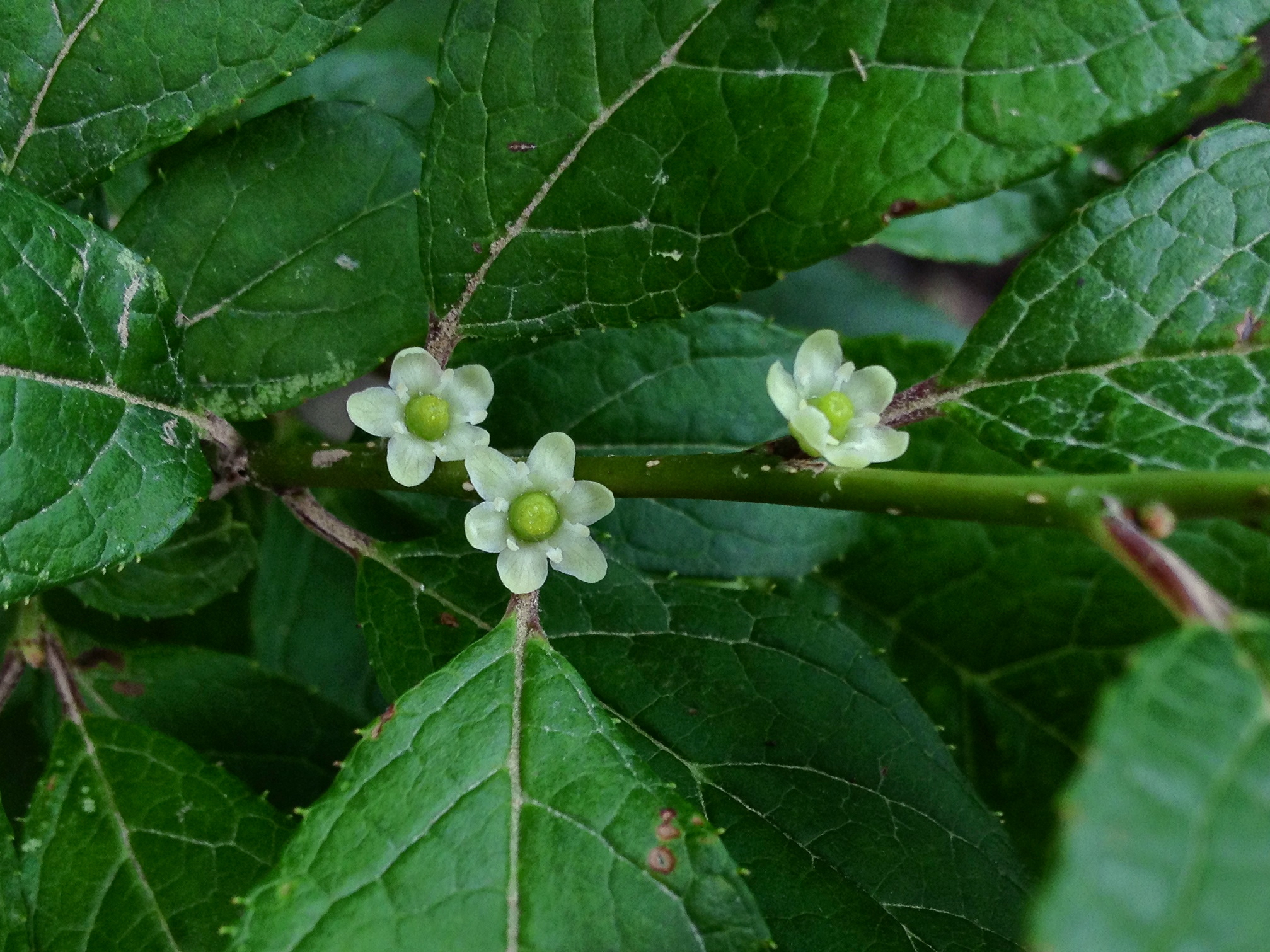
Female, flowers in early summer

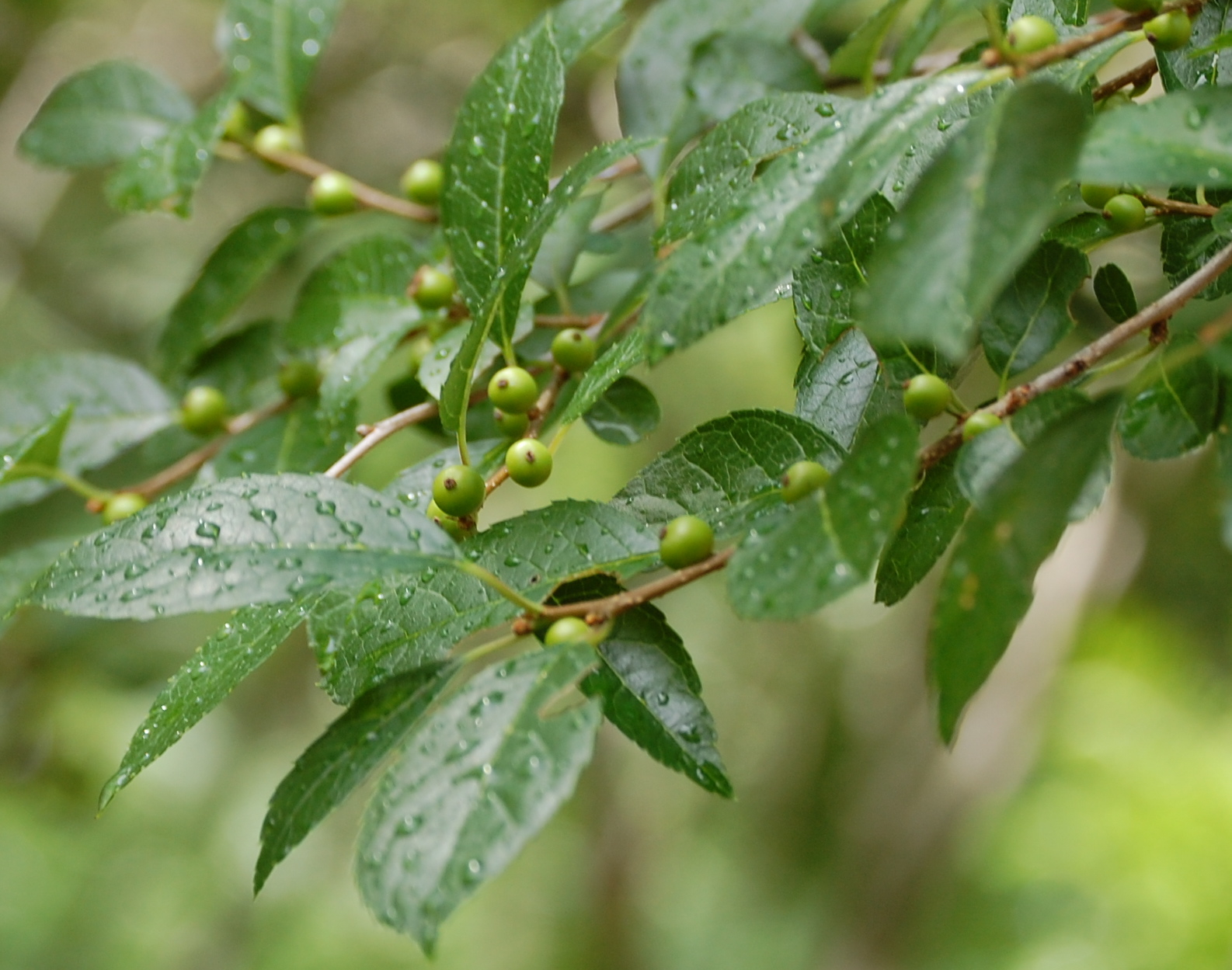
Foliage and unripe fruit in summer

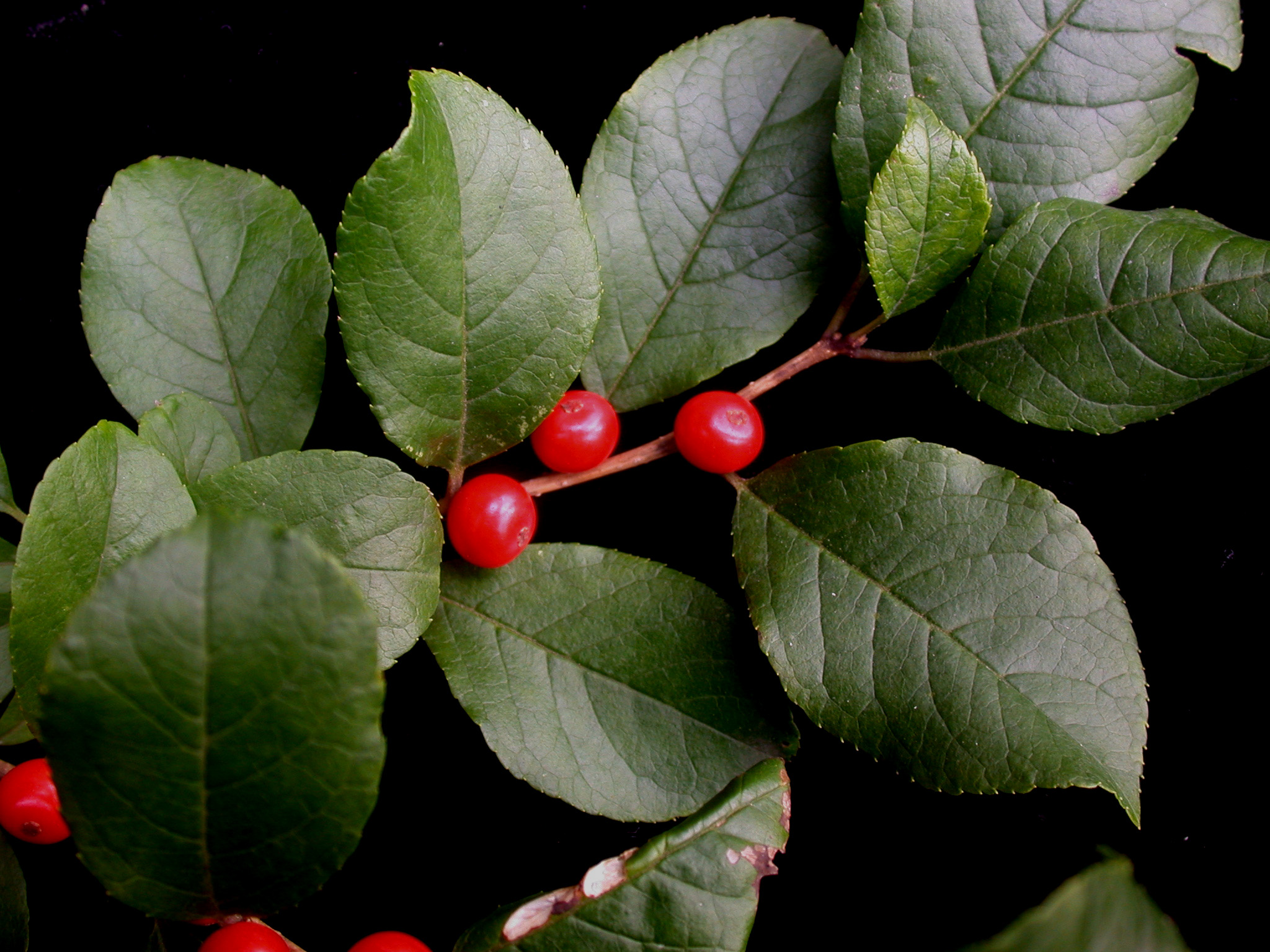

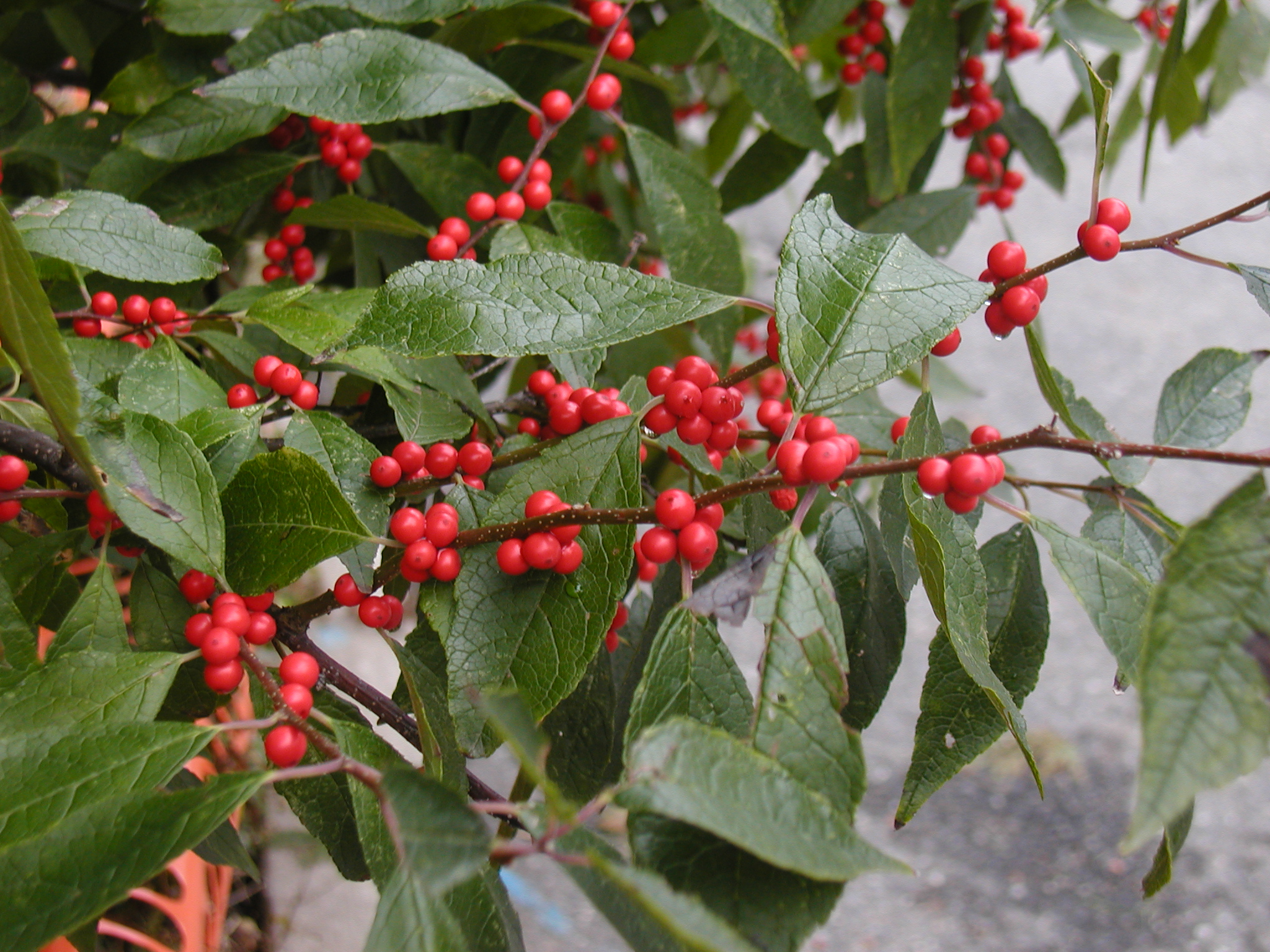
mid autumn

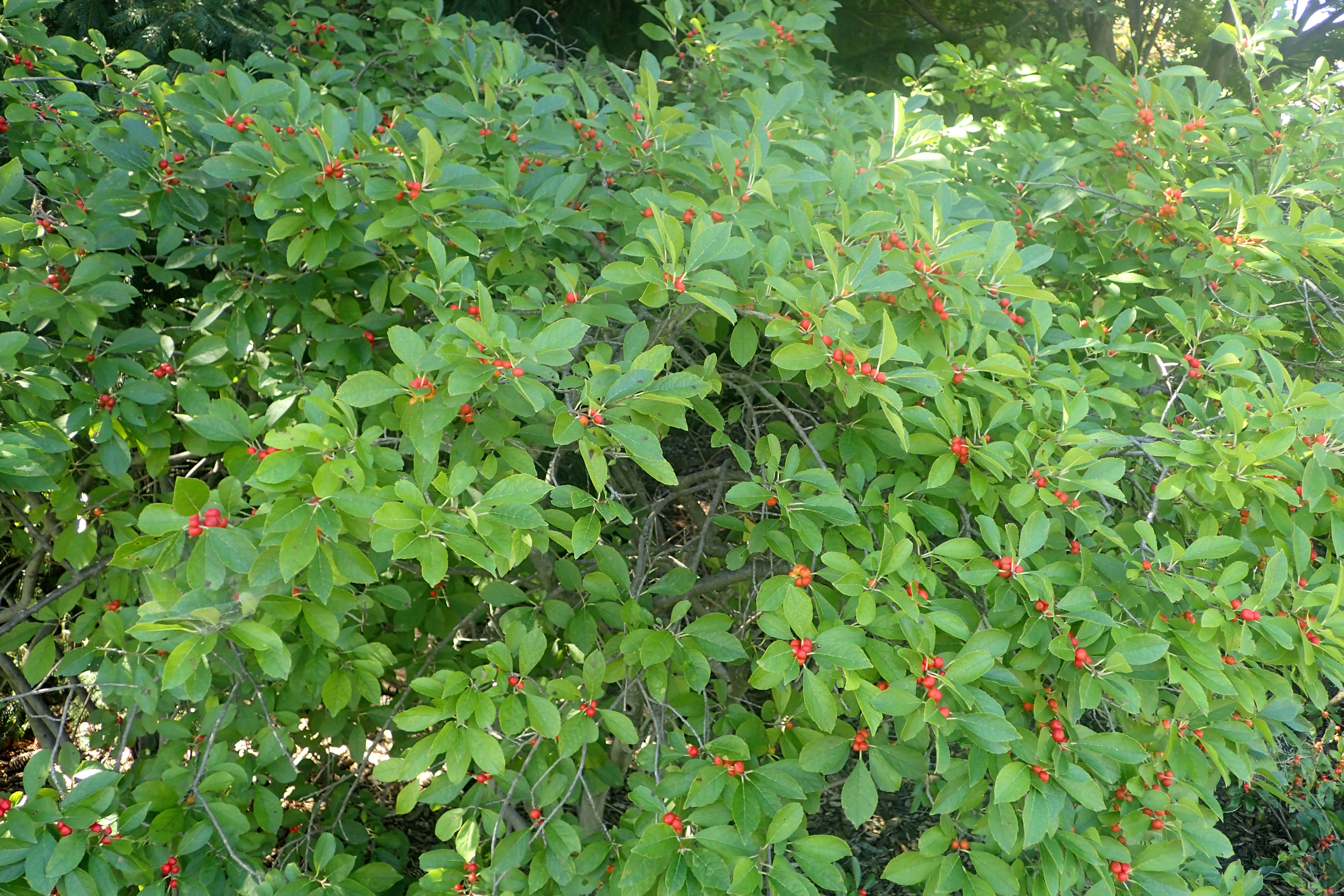

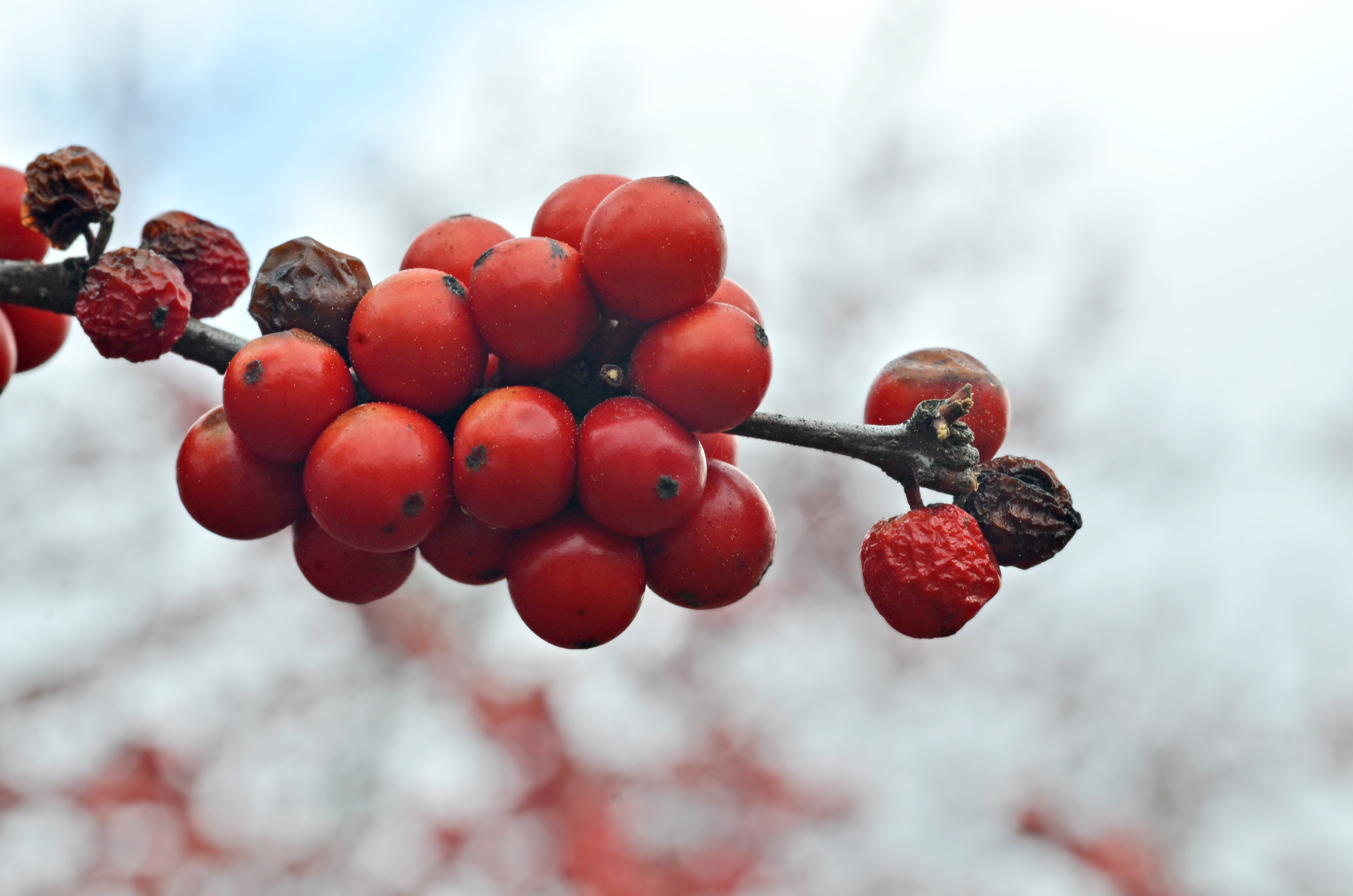
Fruit in the winter

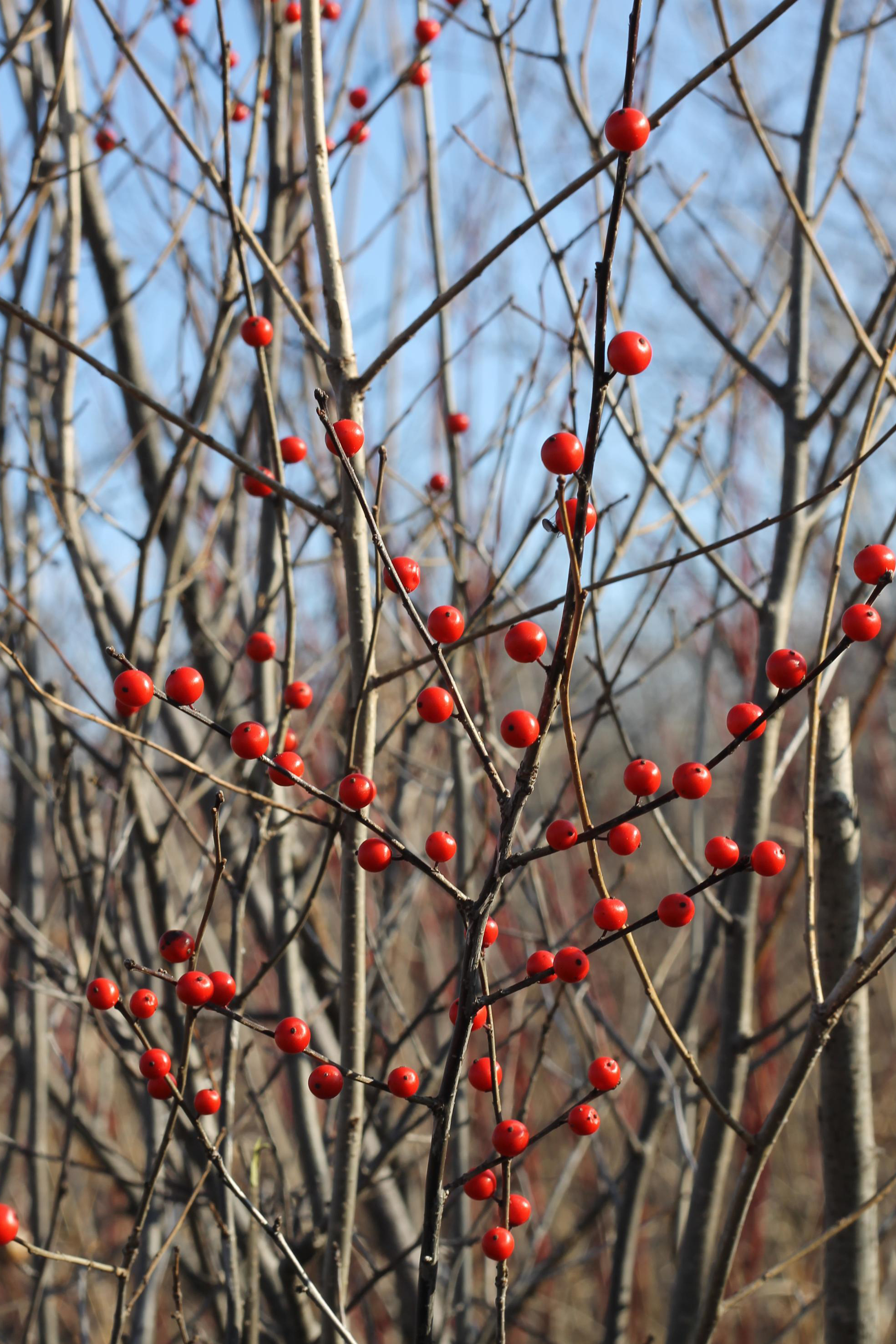
In the winter

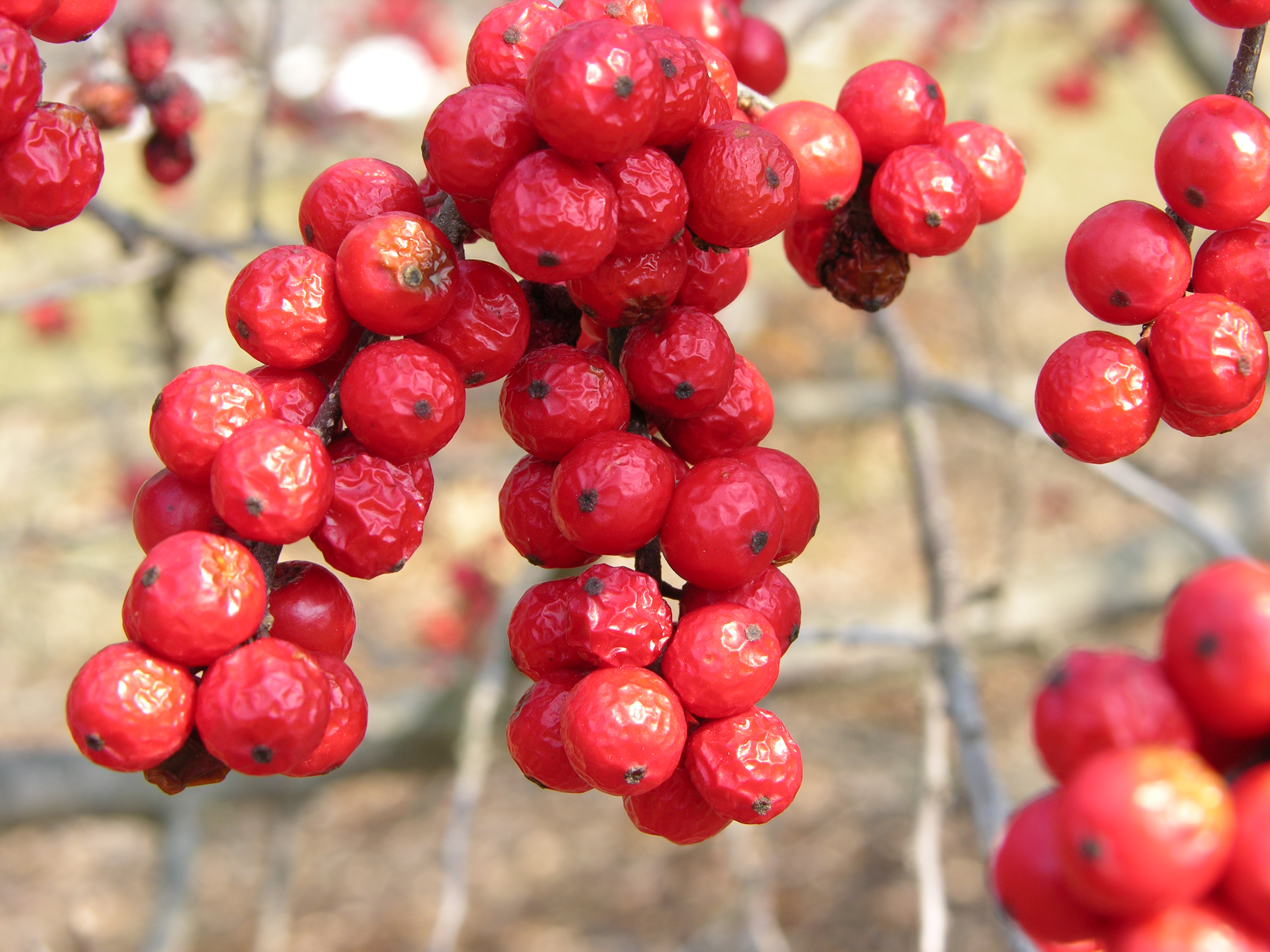
Fruit in winter

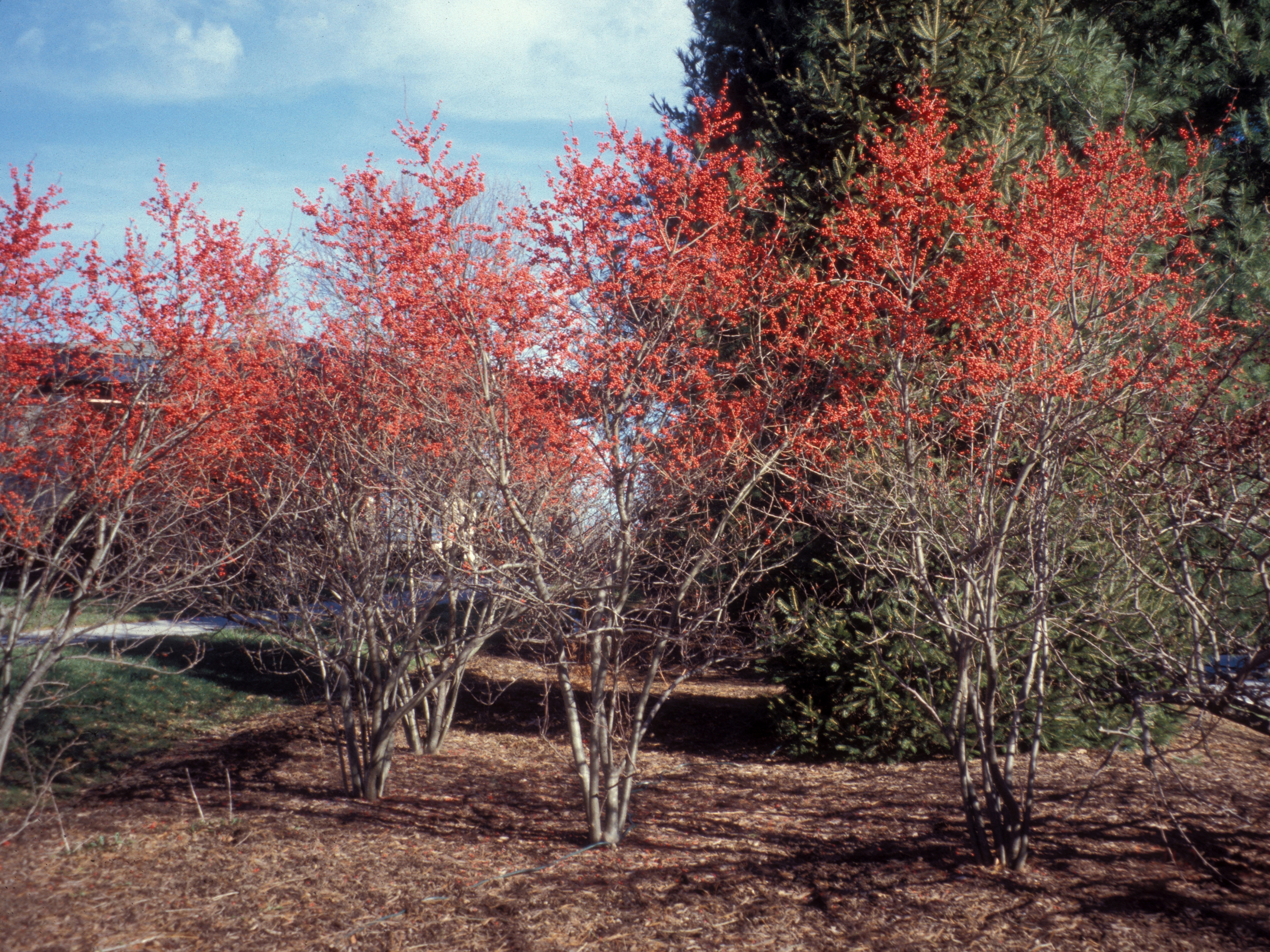

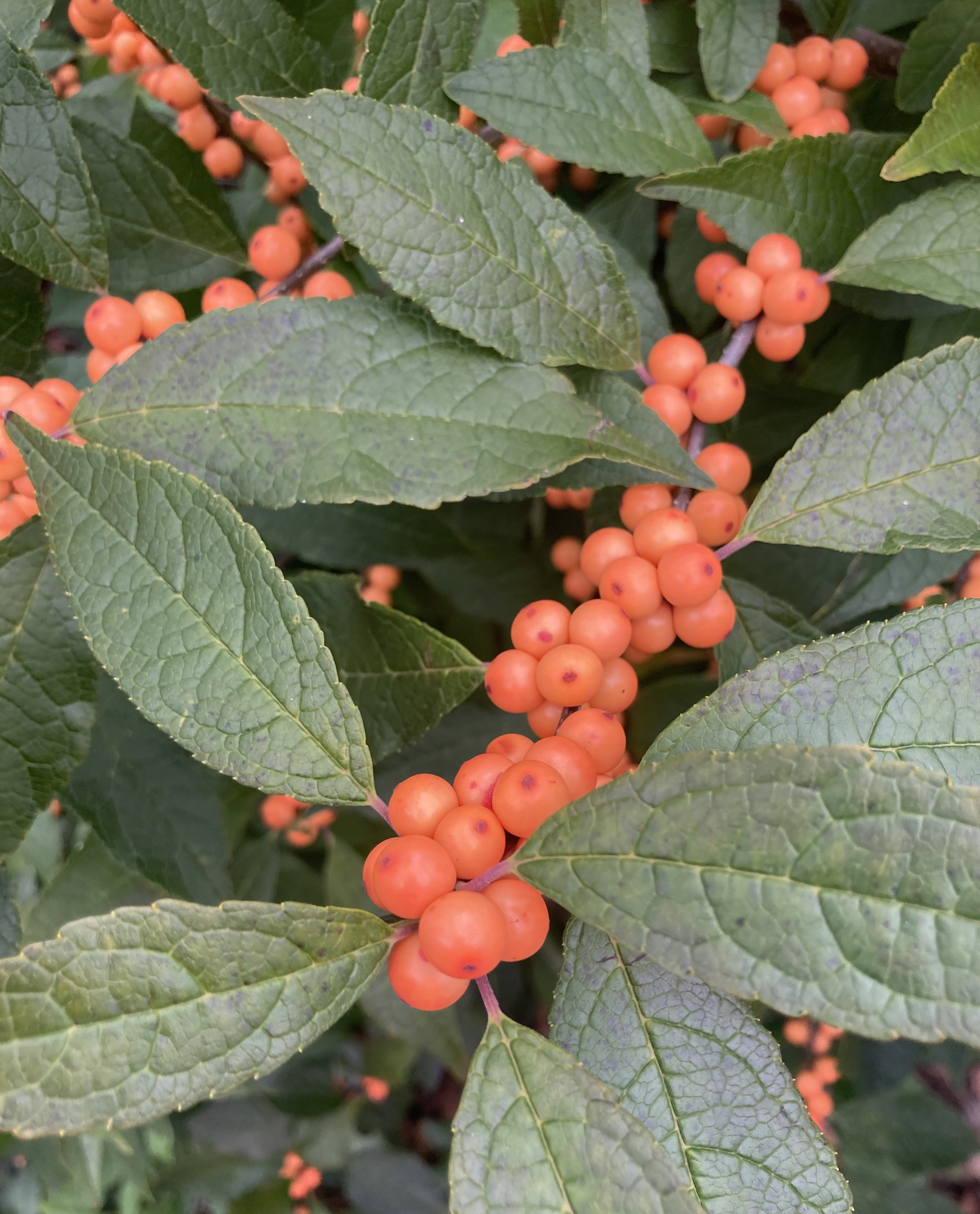
'Winter Gold' variety showing orange berries.
