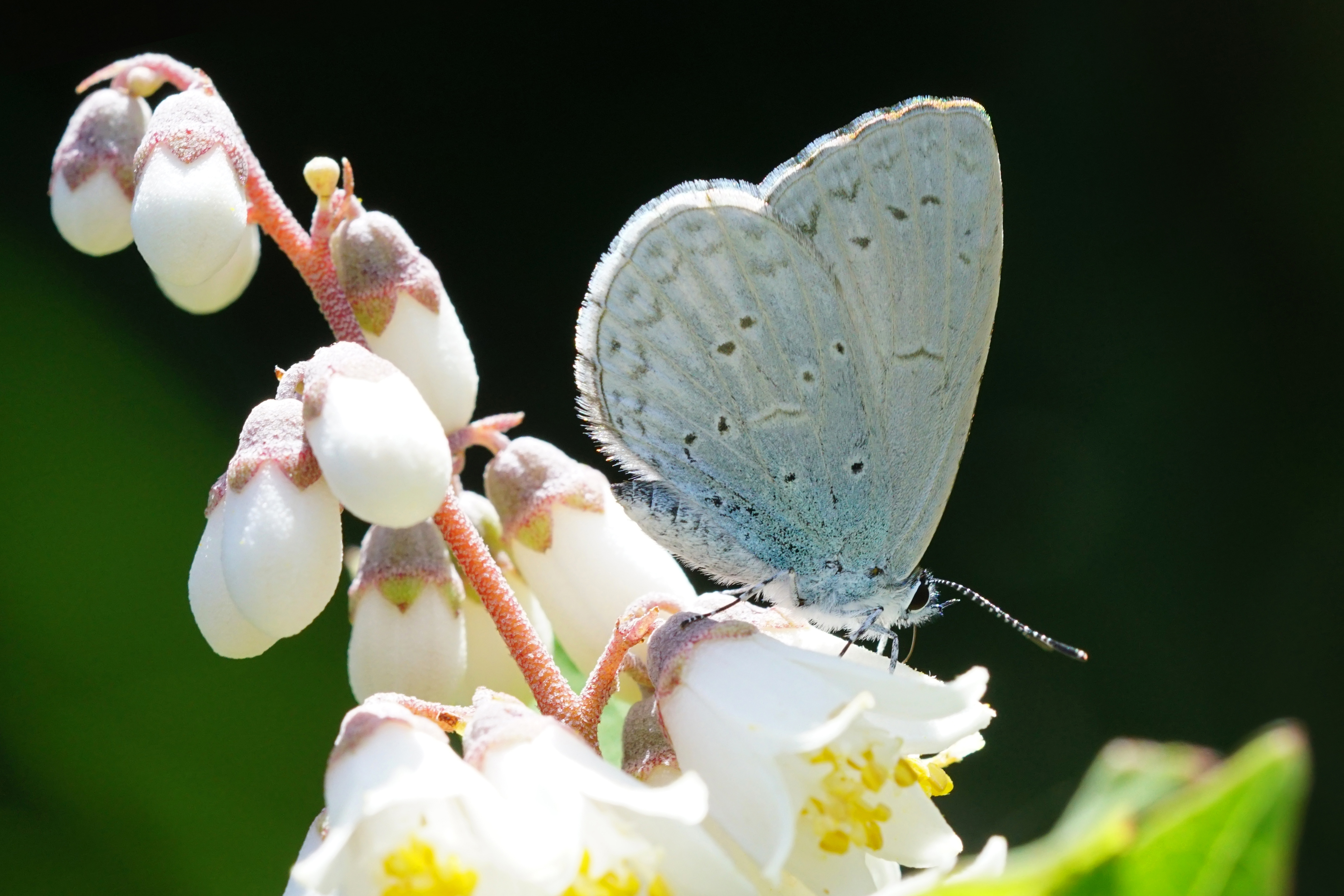

Scientific classification
- Domain: Eukaryota
- Kingdom: Animalia
- Phylum: Arthropoda
- Class: Insecta
- Order: Lepidoptera
- Family: Lycaenidae
- Genus: Celastrina
- Species: C. oreas

Binomial name
- Celastrina oreas (Leech, [1893])

= Celastrina oreas =

Species of butterfly

Celastrina oreas is a small butterfly found in the East Palearctic (Ussuri, China, Nepal, Assam, Burma, Taiwan) that belongs to the lycaenids or blues family.

== Description from Seitz ==
C. oreas Leech (83 f). Male somewhat similar to the male of argiolus, but deeper violet-blue and the black apical area of the wings broader. The female too, is darker, being more purplish blue, the underside bearing fewer, but very strongly marked elongate spots. — In West China, up to 10, 000 ft.

== Biology ==
The larva on feeds on Prinsepia chinensis, Prinsepia scandens, Eurya strigillosa, E. acuminata, E. groffii, Prinsepia scandens

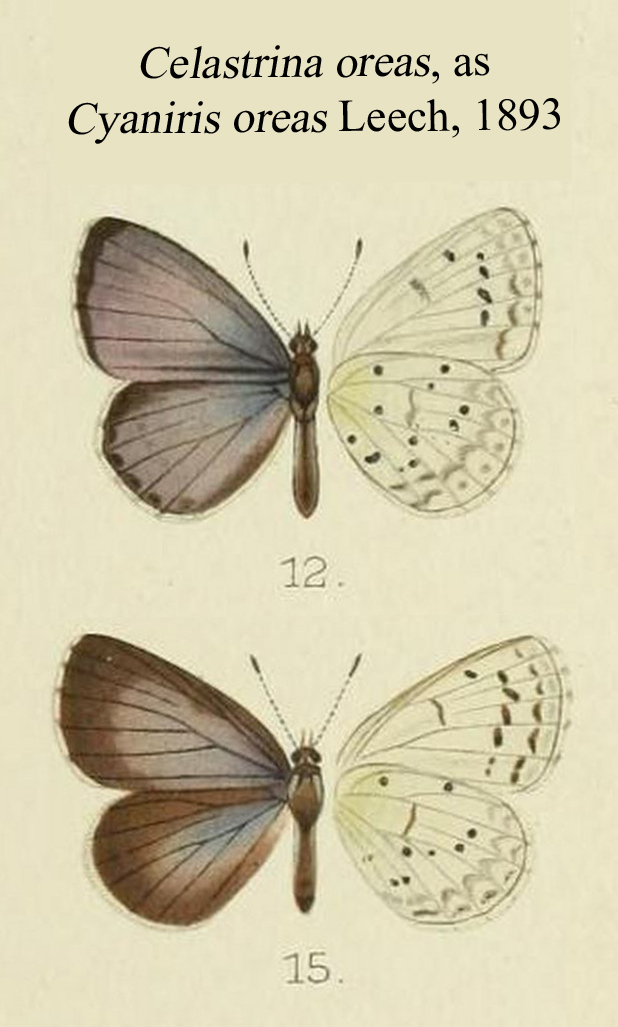
Illustration from Butterflies from China, Japan & Korea, 1893

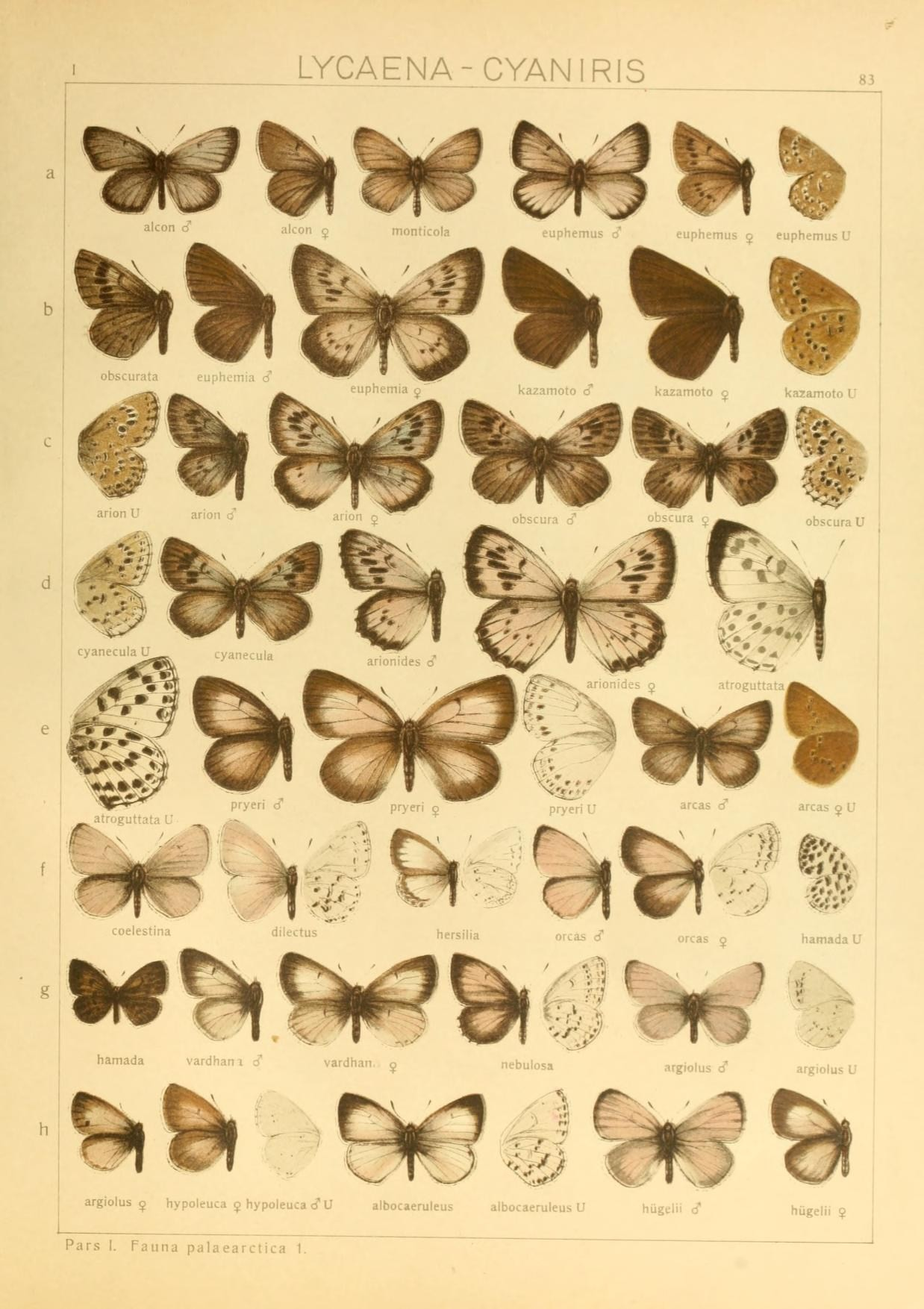
Seitz 83f

== See also ==
- List of butterflies of Russia
