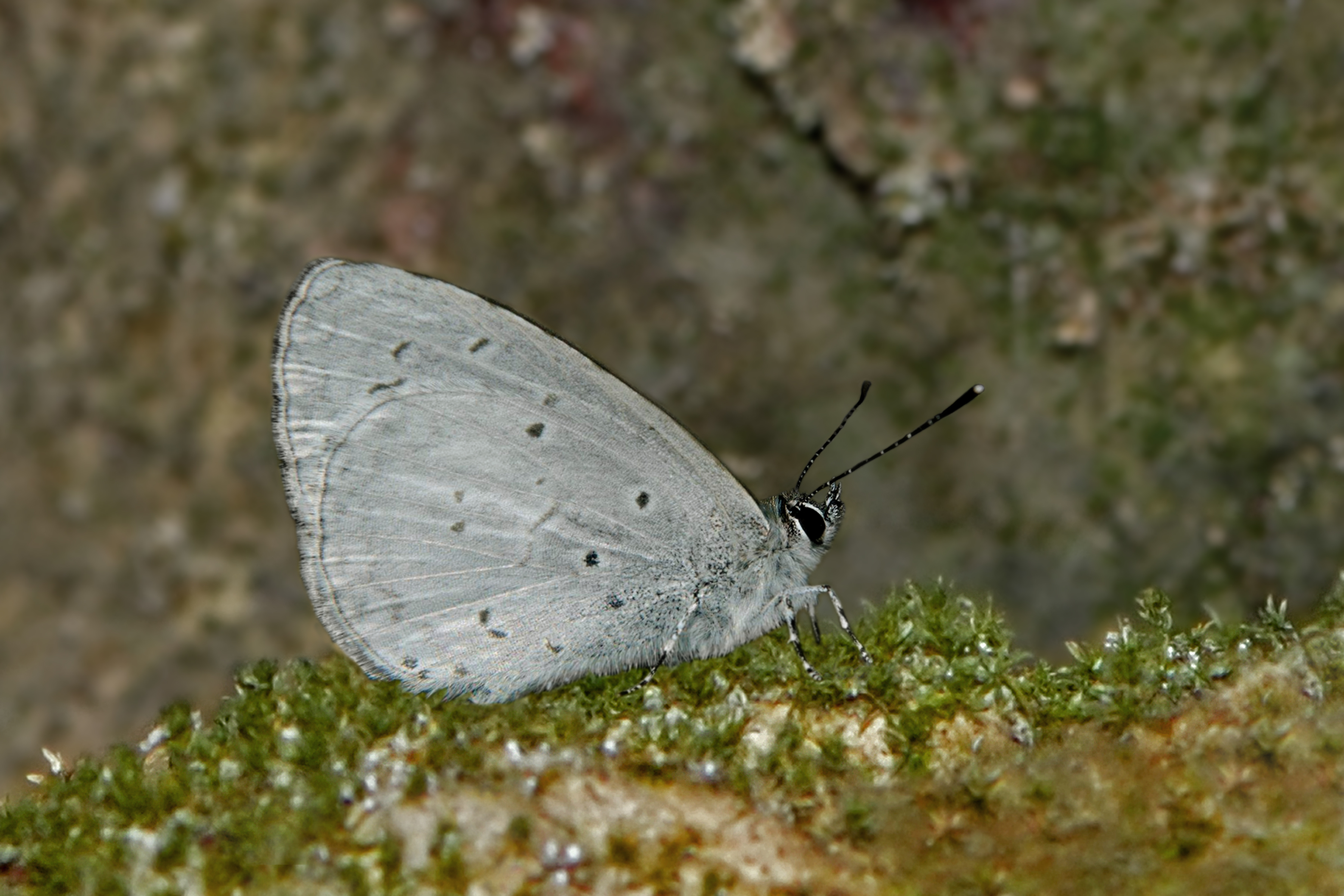

Scientific classification
- Domain: Eukaryota
- Kingdom: Animalia
- Phylum: Arthropoda
- Class: Insecta
- Order: Lepidoptera
- Family: Lycaenidae
- Genus: Celastrina
- Species: C. gigas

Binomial name
- Celastrina gigas (Hemming, 1928)

Synonyms
- Lycaenopsis gigas Hemming, 1928; Lycaenopsis ladonides gigas Hemming, 1928; Celastrina ladonides gigas Hemming, 1928

= Celastrina gigas =

Silvery hedge blue

Species of butterfly

Celastrina gigas, the silvery hedge blue, is a small butterfly found in India that belongs to the lycaenids or blues family. The species was first described by Francis Hemming in 1928.

== Taxonomy ==
The species is considered to consist of the following subspecies:

- C. g. gigas – nominate subspecies
- C. g. fujianensis Huang, 1994 Fujian

== Range ==
It is found in the West Himalaya.

== See also ==
- List of butterflies of India
- List of butterflies of India (Lycaenidae)
