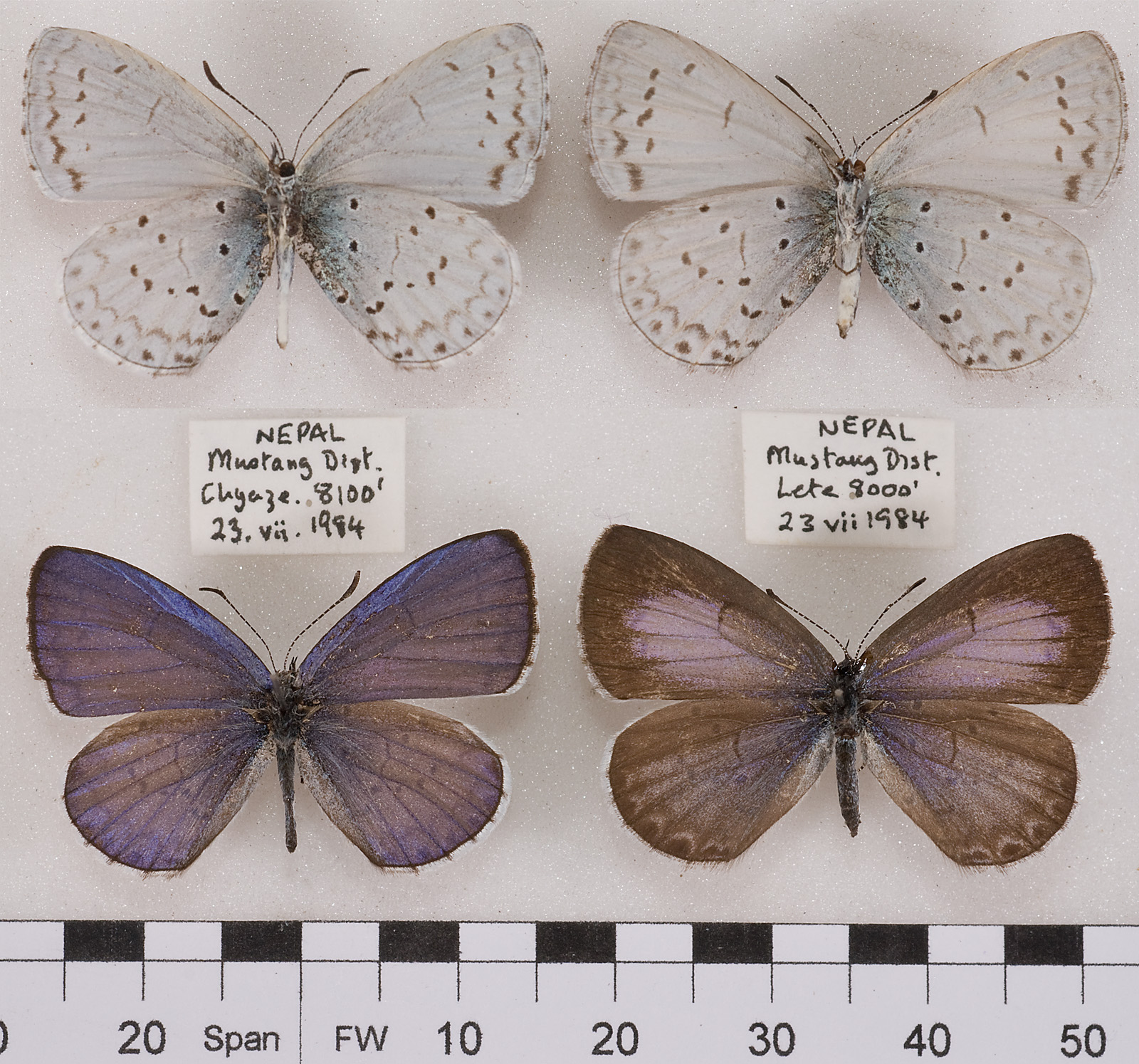

Scientific classification
- Kingdom: Animalia
- Phylum: Arthropoda
- Class: Insecta
- Order: Lepidoptera
- Family: Lycaenidae
- Genus: Celastrina
- Species: C. huegeli

Binomial name
- Celastrina huegeli (Moore, 1882)

Synonyms
- Celastrina huegelii; Lycaenopsis huegelii

= Celastrina huegeli =

Large hedge blue

Species of butterfly

Celastrina huegeli, the large hedge blue, is a small butterfly found in India that belongs to the lycaenids or blues family.

== Taxonomy ==
The alternate scientific name is Celastrina huegelii. The butterfly was earlier known as Lycaenopsis huegelii Moore.

The spelling of the species taxon name is usually found in literature as huegelii, except for the NHM's LepIndex site where it is recorded as huegeli.

The species is considered to consist of the following subspecies:

- C. h. heugelii – nominate subspecies
- C. h. singalensis – previously Lycaenopsis singalensis as per Evans and considered as Polyommatus singalensis as per NHM's LepIndex
- C. h. dipora – dusky blue Cupid previously Everes dipora as per Evans

== Range ==
It is found in Kashmir to Kumaon in India. Markku Savela's site gives range of the butterfly as Himalayas to Sri Lanka, Myanmar, and northern Thailand, the extended range being due to the inclusion of C. h. singalensis and C. h. dipora as part of the huegelii species.

== See also ==
- List of butterflies of India
- List of butterflies of India (Lycaenidae)
