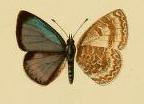

Scientific classification
- Kingdom: Animalia
- Phylum: Arthropoda
- Class: Insecta
- Order: Lepidoptera
- Family: Lycaenidae
- Genus: Celastrina
- Species: C. acesina

Binomial name
- Celastrina acesina (Bethune-Baker, 1906)

Synonyms
- Cyaniris acesina Bethune-Baker, 1906

= Celastrina acesina =

Species of butterfly

Celastrina acesina is a species of butterfly of the family Lycaenidae. It is found in south-eastern Papua New Guinea.
