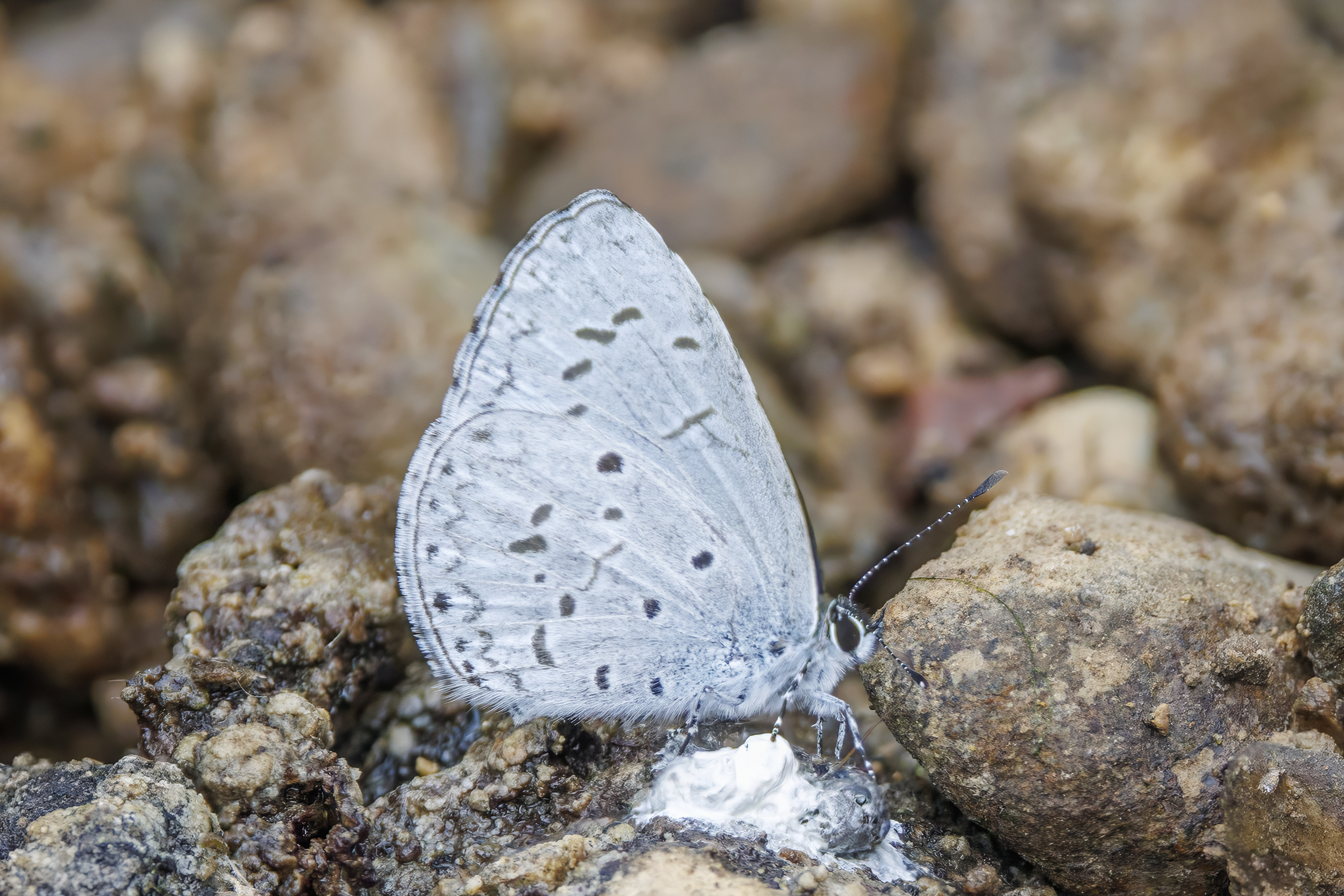
- C. l. limbata, Laos

Scientific classification
- Kingdom: Animalia
- Phylum: Arthropoda
- Class: Insecta
- Order: Lepidoptera
- Family: Lycaenidae
- Genus: Celastrina
- Species: C. lavendularis

Binomial name
- Celastrina lavendularis (Moore, 1877)

= Celastrina lavendularis =

Plain hedge blue

Species of butterfly

Celastrina lavendularis, the plain hedge blue, is a small butterfly found in Sri Lanka, India, and across the Indomalayan realm that belongs to the lycaenids or blues family.

== Description ==
Male. Upperside dark lavender-blue, with an extremely narrow black outer marginal border. Female paler, and of a purple lavender-blue. Forewing with the base of the costa and an outer band black. Hindwing with black anterior border and marginal row of prominent pale-bordered black spots. Cilia white, with inner black border. Underside greyish-white. Forewing with dusky-black streak at end of the cell, a discal series of oblique spots, and marginal row of small spots enclosed by a dentated line. Hindwing with three black subbasal spots, some specimens with a smaller spot at base of subcostal and another at base of lower median vein, a curved series of seven discal spots, and a marginal row of spots enclosed by a dentate line.

— Frederic Moore, The Lepidoptera of Ceylon. Vol. I

== Taxonomy ==
The butterfly was earlier known as Lycaenopsis lavendularis Moore.

== Subspecies ==
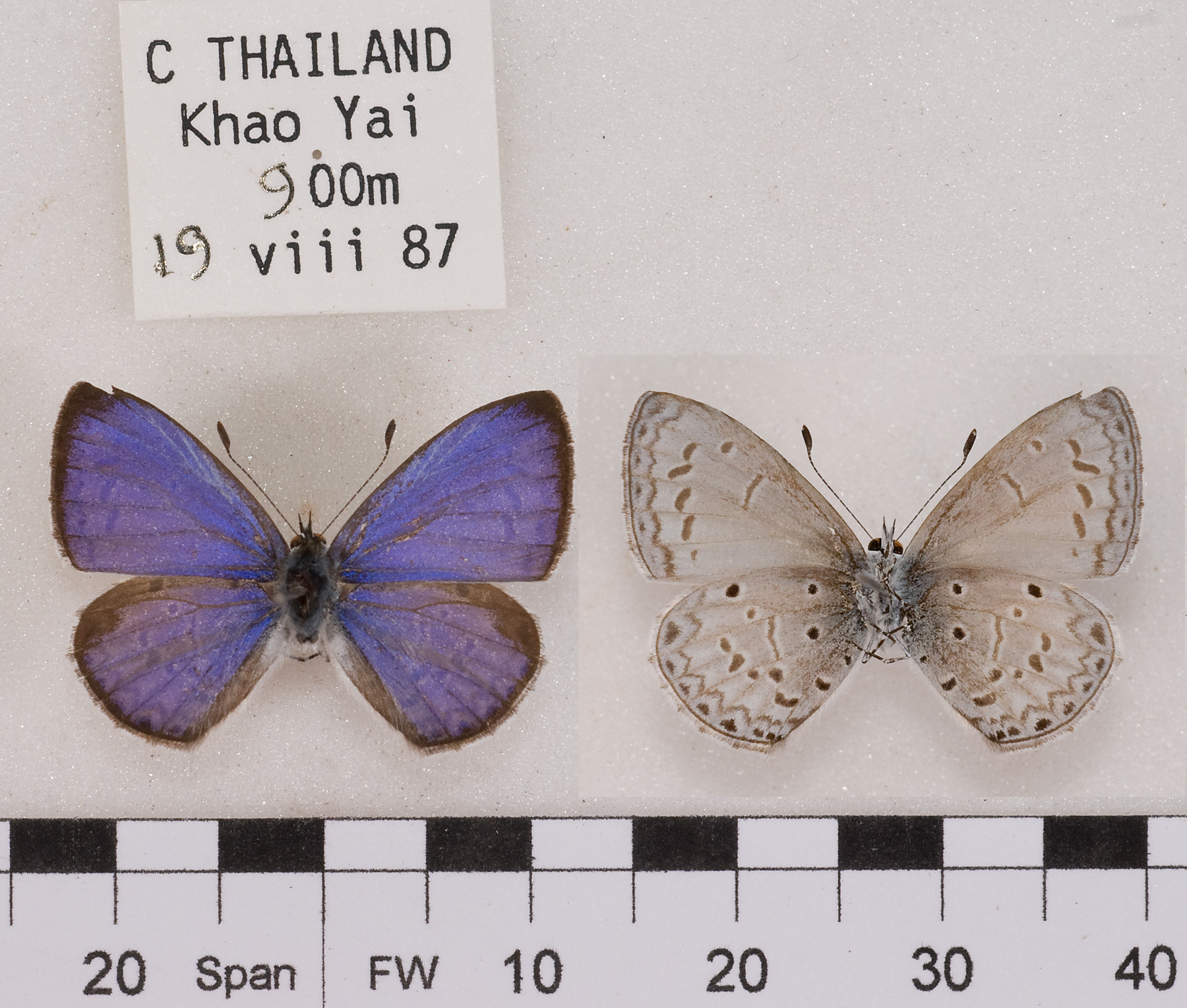
Celastrina lavendularis limbata

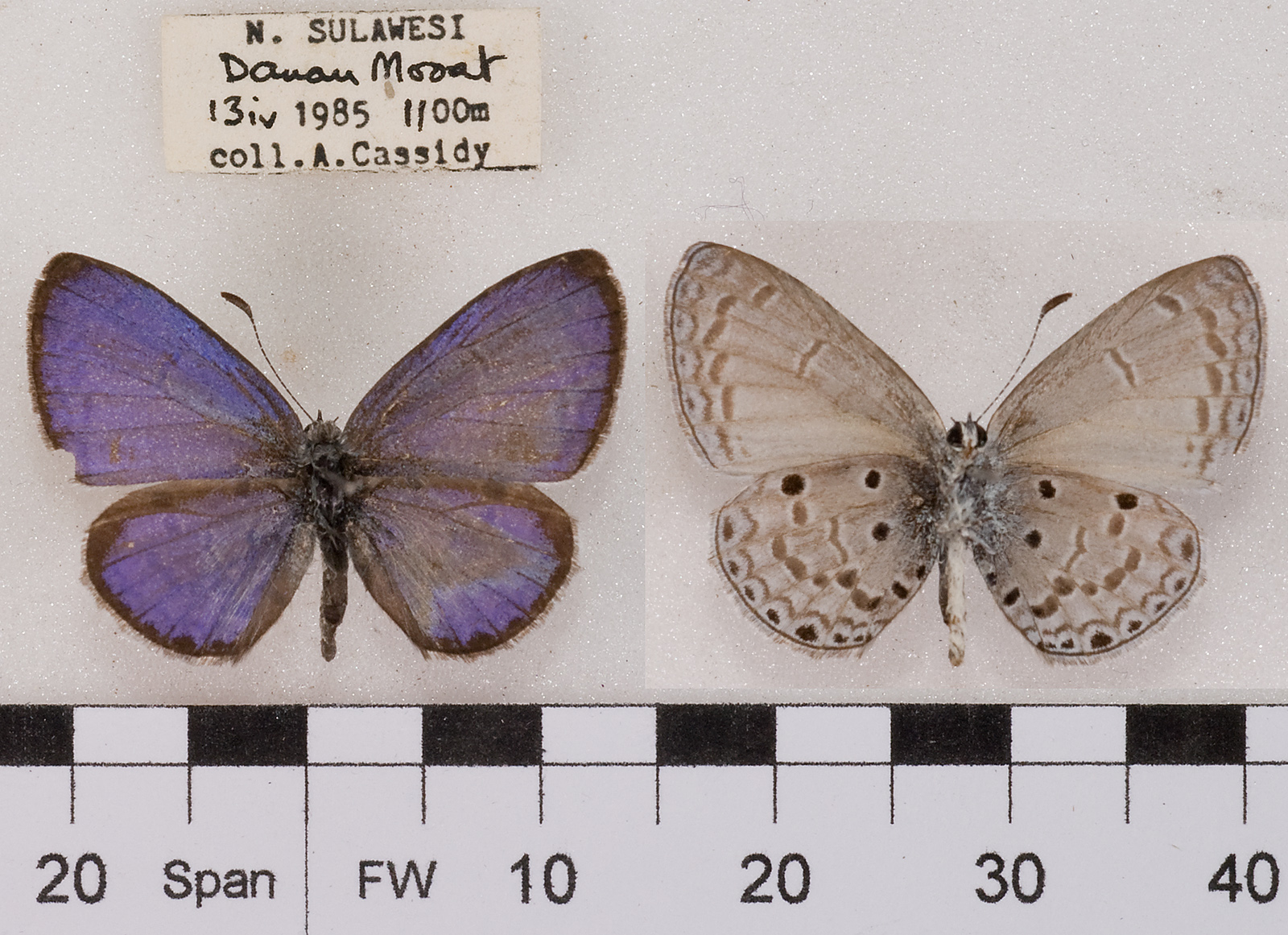
Celastrina lavendularis lyce
- Celastrina lavendularis aroana Eliot and Kawazoe, 1983 Papua New Guinea
- Celastrina lavendularis chloe Eliot and Kawazoe, 1983 Moluccas
- Celastrina lavendularis epicharma (Fruhstorfer, 1910) Flores
- Celastrina lavendularis floresana (Courvoisier, 1912) Java
- Celastrina lavendularis gadara (Fruhstorfer, 1910) Moluccas
- Celastrina lavendularis hermesianax (Fruhstorfer, 1910) Philippines
- Celastrina lavendularis himilcon (Fruhstorfer, 1909) Taiwan
- Celastrina lavendularis isabella Corbet, 1937. Malaya
- Celastrina lavendularis lavendularis (Moore, 1877). Sri Lanka (type)
- Celastrina lavendularis limbata (Moore, 1879).India (type)
- Celastrina lavendularis lyce (Grose-Smith, 1896) Celebes
- Celastrina lavendularis placidina (Fruhstorfer, 1917) Sumatra

== See also ==
- List of butterflies of India
- List of butterflies of India (Lycaenidae)
