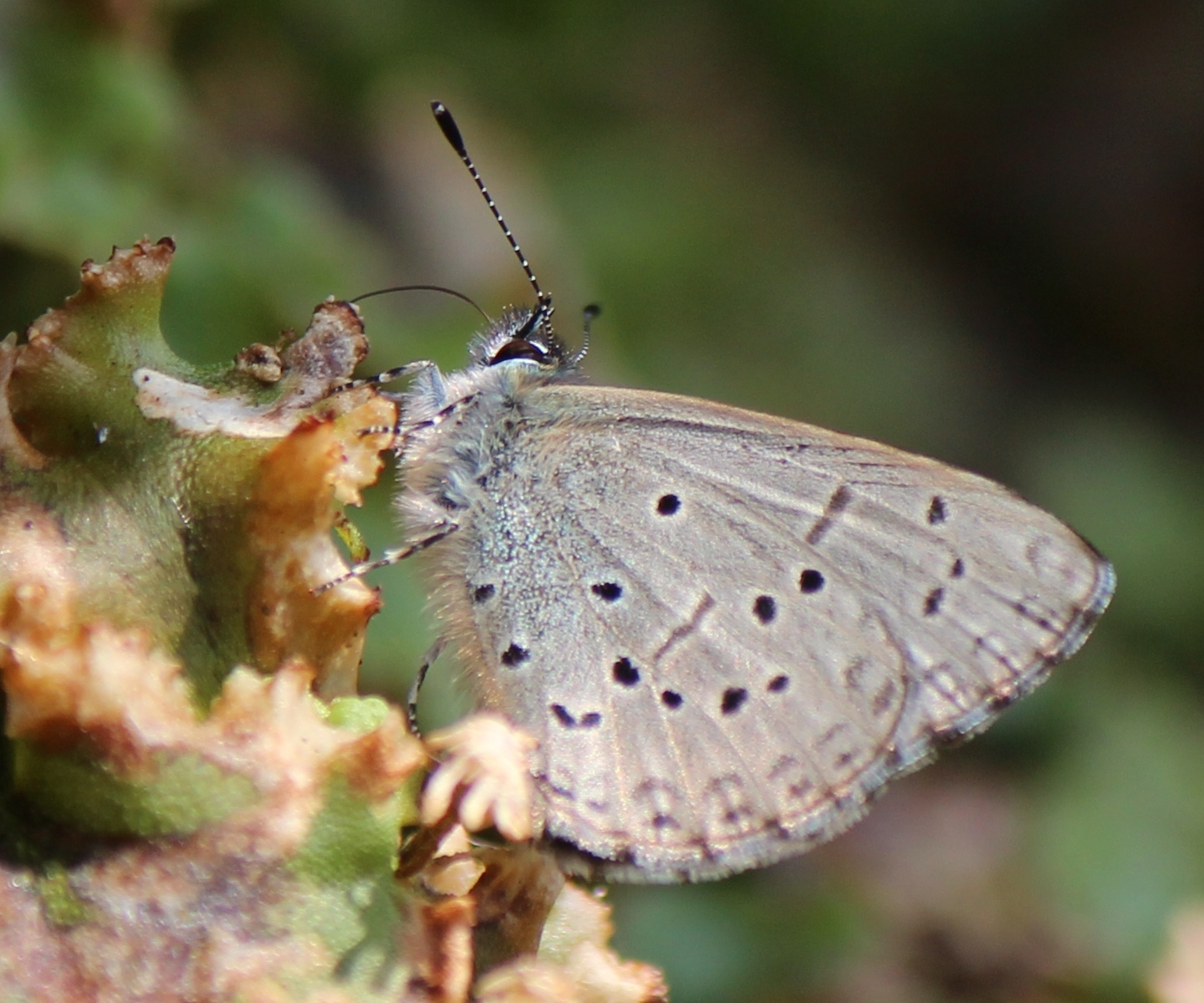

Scientific classification
- Domain: Eukaryota
- Kingdom: Animalia
- Phylum: Arthropoda
- Class: Insecta
- Order: Lepidoptera
- Family: Lycaenidae
- Genus: Celastrina
- Species: C. sugitanii

Binomial name
- Celastrina sugitanii Mastumura, 1919

Synonyms
- Lycaena sugitanii

= Celastrina sugitanii =

Species of butterfly

Celastrina sugitanii is a species of butterfly in the family Lycaenidae that is native to Japan and Taiwan.

== Taxonomy ==
There are 5 recognised subspecies:

- Celastrina sugitanii ainonica Murayama, 1952
- Celastrina sugitanii kyushuensis Shirôzu, 1948
- Celastrina sugitanii leei Eliot & Kawazoé, 1983
- Celastrina sugitanii shirozui Hsu, 1987
- Celastrina sugitanii sugitanii Mastumura, 1919
