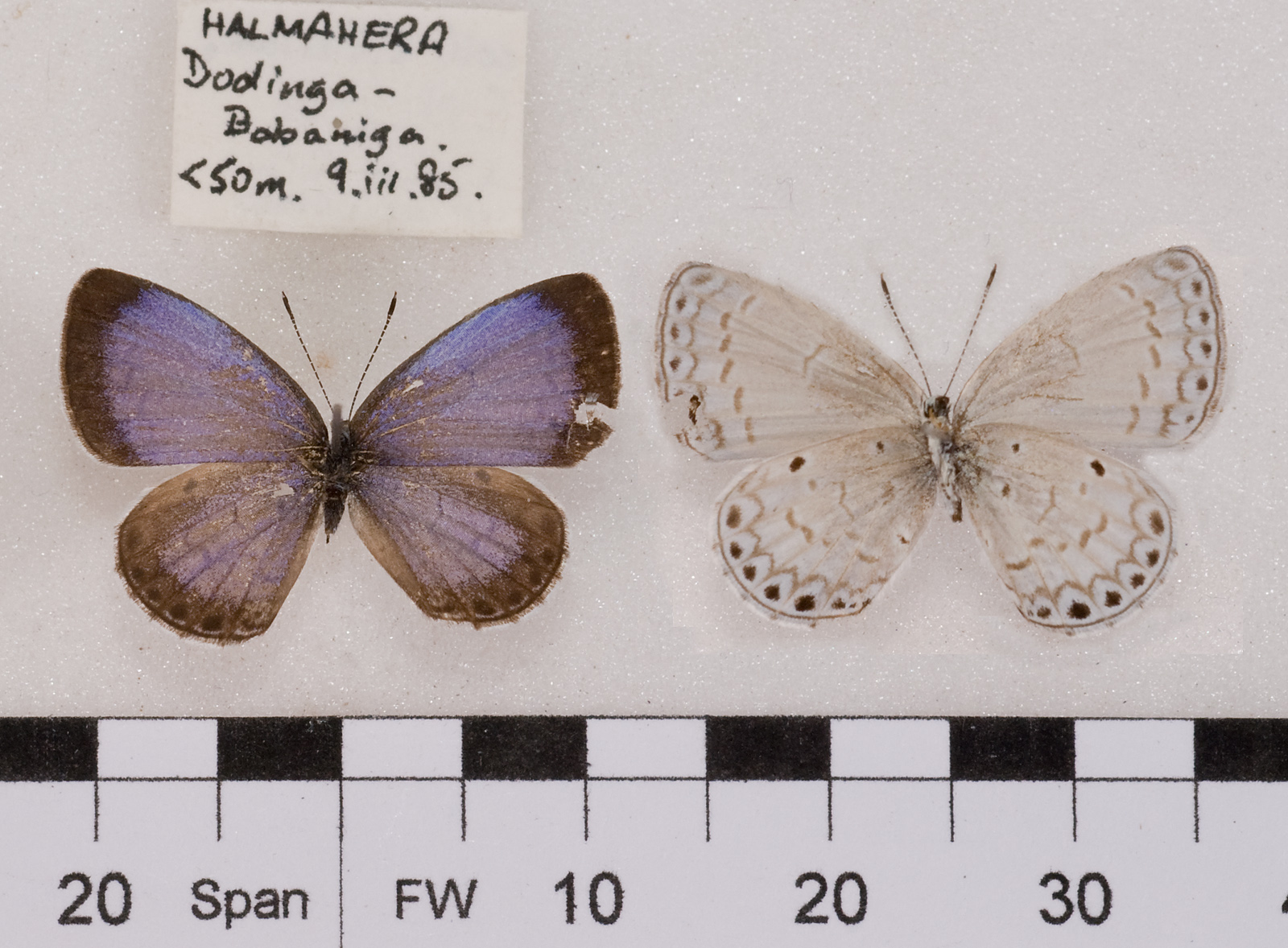

Scientific classification
- Kingdom: Animalia
- Phylum: Arthropoda
- Class: Insecta
- Order: Lepidoptera
- Family: Lycaenidae
- Genus: Celastrina
- Species: C. philippina

Binomial name
- Celastrina philippina (Semper, 1889)

= Celastrina philippina =

Species of butterfly

Celastrina philippina is a small butterfly found in the Indomalayan realm and which crosses the Wallace Line into the Australasian realm that belongs to the lycaenids or blues family.
