= Celastrina humulus =

Conservation status
- Imperiled (NatureServe)

Scientific classification
- Kingdom: Animalia
- Phylum: Arthropoda
- Clade: Pancrustacea
- Class: Insecta
- Order: Lepidoptera
- Family: Lycaenidae
- Genus: Celastrina
- Species: C. humulus

Binomial name
- Celastrina humulus Scott & D. Wright, 1998

Species of butterfly

Celastrina humulus, the hops azure, is a species of blue in the family Lycaenidae. It is found in North America. The main host plant is wild hops. They can change their body temperature by behaviors like basking or sitting in shade. The hops azure has a mutualistic relationship with ants, called myrmecophiles.

The MONA or Hodges number for Celastrina humulus is 4363.3.
