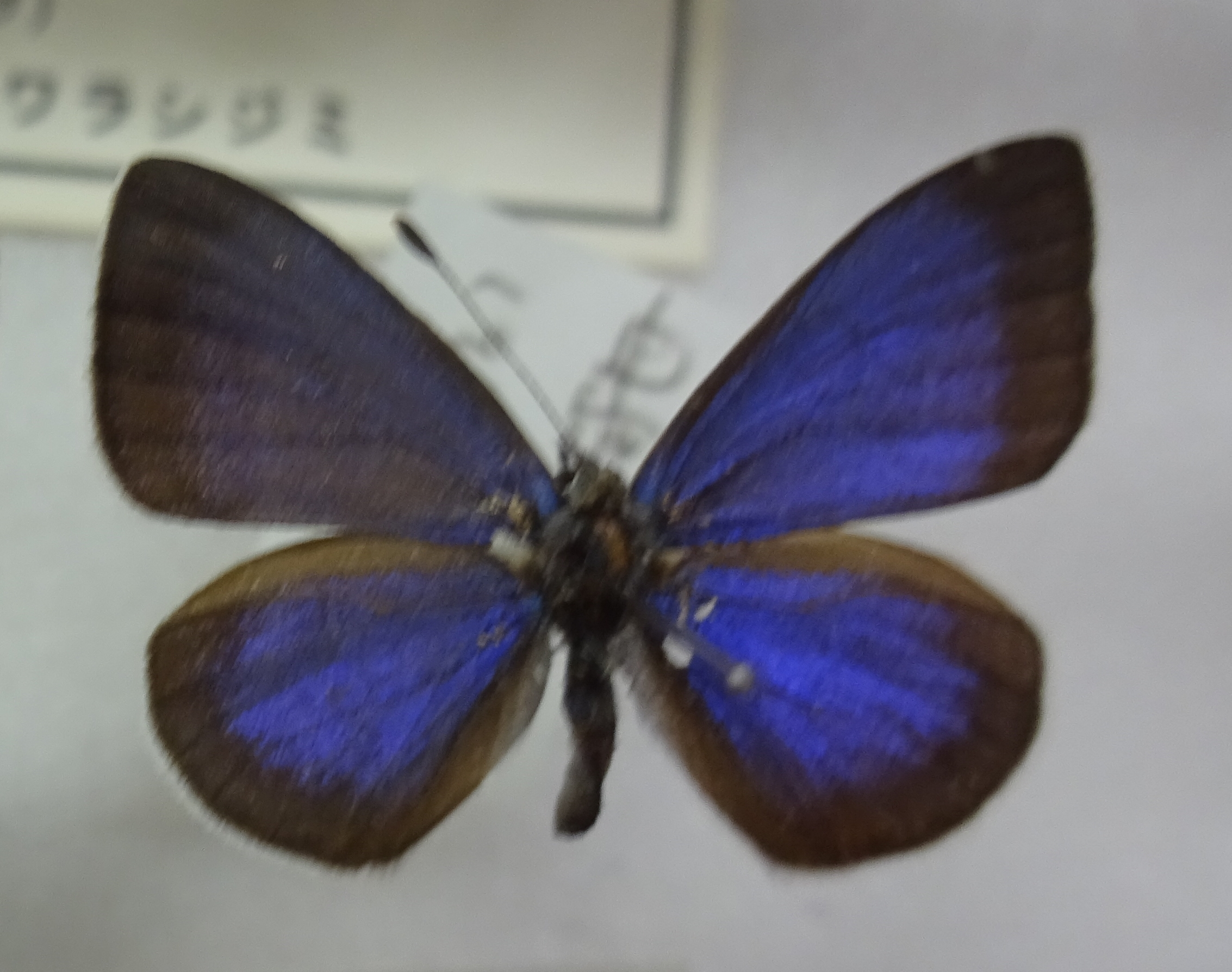

Scientific classification
- Domain: Eukaryota
- Kingdom: Animalia
- Phylum: Arthropoda
- Class: Insecta
- Order: Lepidoptera
- Family: Lycaenidae
- Genus: Celastrina
- Species: C. ogasawaraensis

Binomial name
- Celastrina ogasawaraensis (Pryer, [1886])

= Celastrina ogasawaraensis =

Species of butterfly

Celastrina ogasawaraensis also known as the Ogasawara holly blue was a species of butterfly in the family Lycaenidae. It was endemic to the Ogasawara Islands of Japan. The Ogasawara holly blue was relatively common up until the 1970s when its population began to decline, likely caused by the destruction of native plant life on the islands. The last wild individuals were seen alive in 2018, and it is now feared extinct. Attempts to create a captive breeding program at the Tama Zoological Park failed when the last individuals died in 2020.
