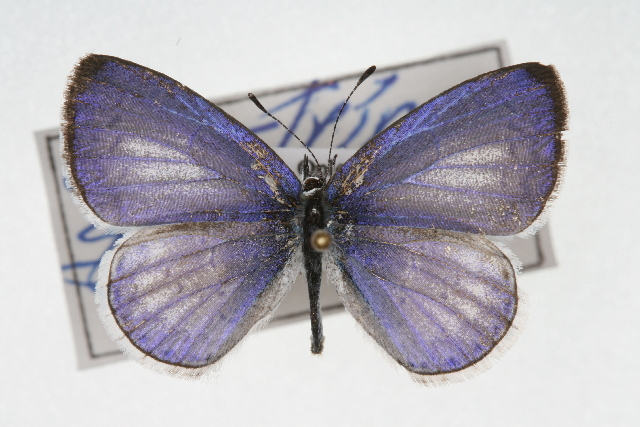

Scientific classification
- Domain: Eukaryota
- Kingdom: Animalia
- Phylum: Arthropoda
- Class: Insecta
- Order: Lepidoptera
- Family: Lycaenidae
- Genus: Celastrina
- Species: C. gozora

Binomial name
- Celastrina gozora (Boisduval, 1870)

Synonyms
- Lycaena gozora Boisduval, 1870; Celastrina argiolus gozora

= Celastrina gozora =

Mexican azure

Species of butterfly

Celastrina gozora, the Mexican azure, is a butterfly of the family Lycaenidae. It is found in Mexico, Panama, and Honduras.
