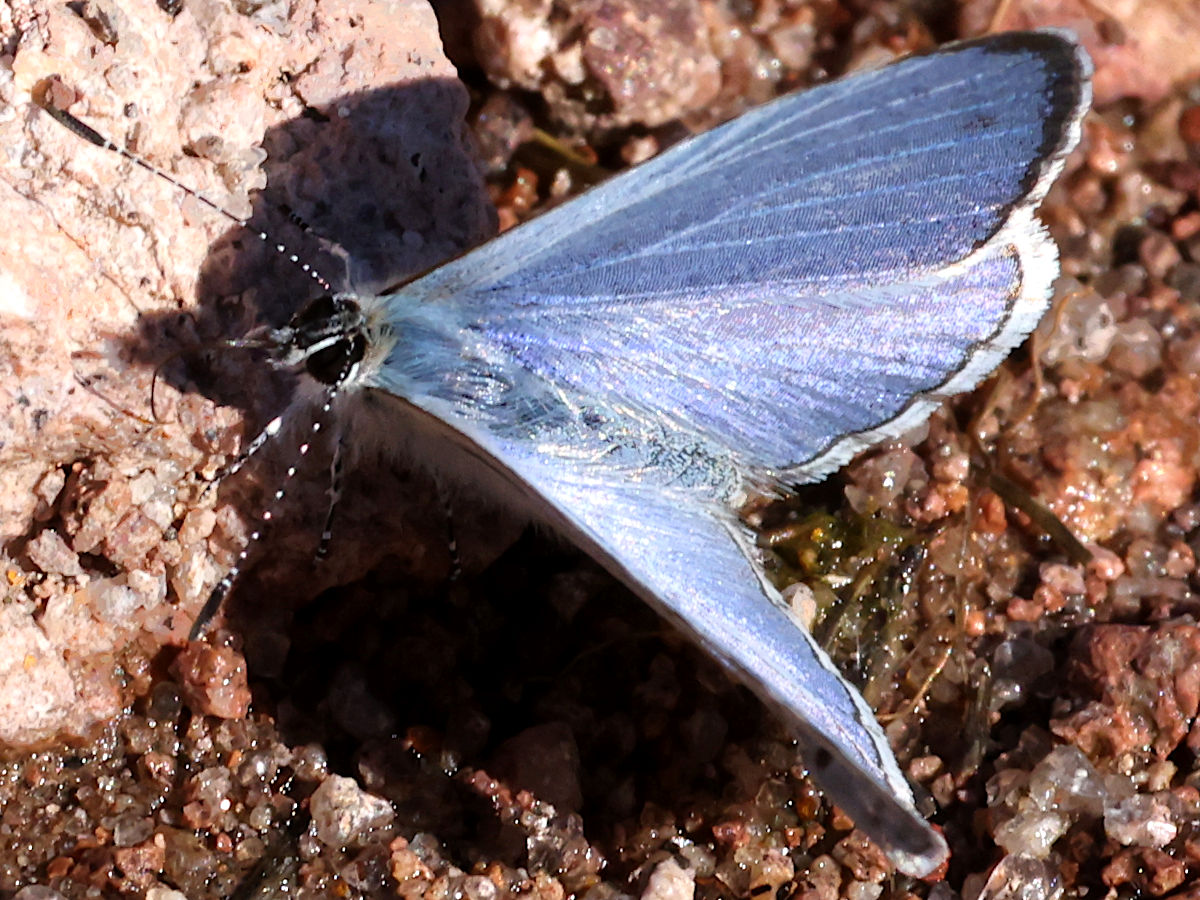
- C. echo cinerea upperside
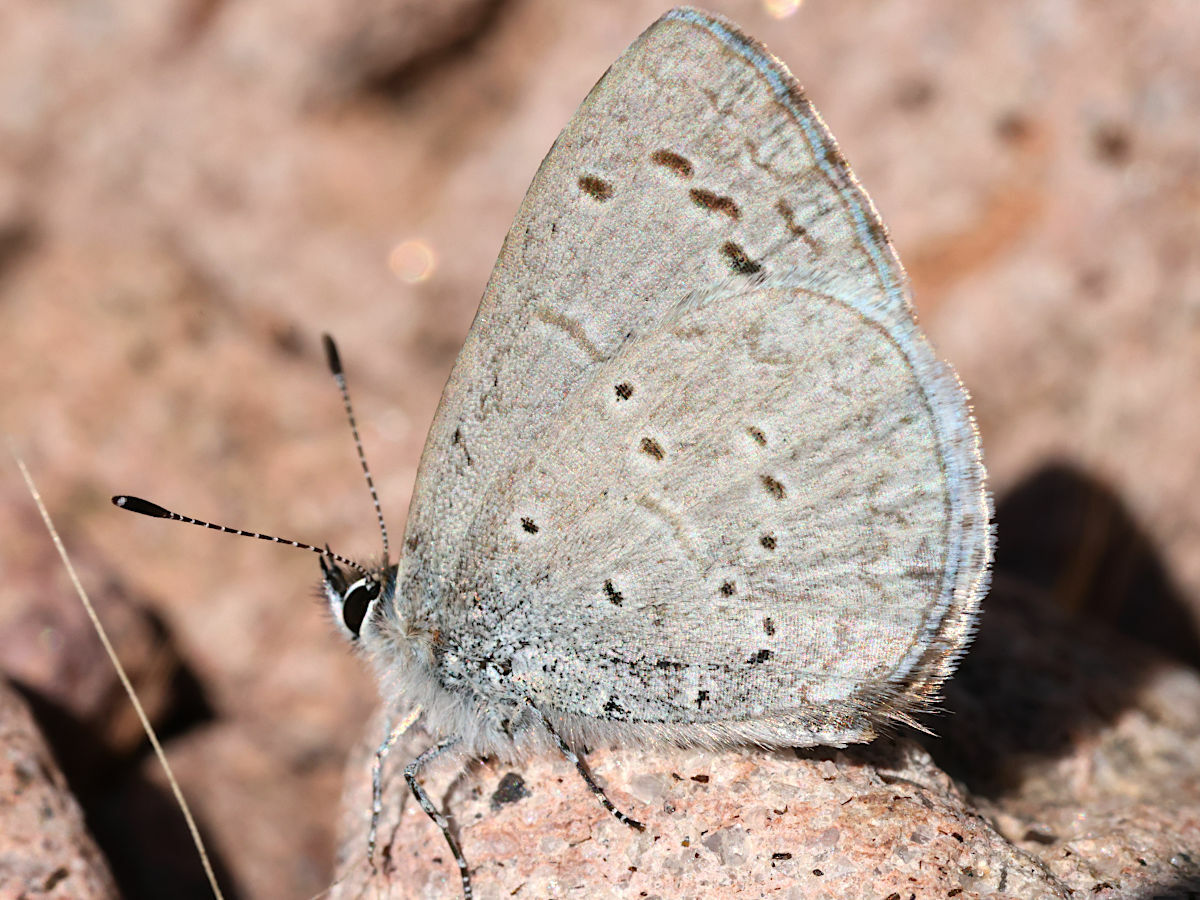
- C. echo cinerea underside

Conservation status
- Secure (NatureServe)

Scientific classification
- Kingdom: Animalia
- Phylum: Arthropoda
- Clade: Pancrustacea
- Class: Insecta
- Order: Lepidoptera
- Family: Lycaenidae
- Genus: Celastrina
- Species: C. echo

Binomial name
- Celastrina echo (W. H. Edwards, 1864)

= Celastrina echo =

Species of butterfly

Celastrina echo, the echo azure or western azure, is a species of blue in the butterfly family Lycaenidae. Celastrina echo have been observed in mostly western regions of the United States, including California, Oregon, Arizona, New Mexico, and Montana.

The taxonomic division of Celastrina butterflies has been a very complicated issue. Some scientists like Layberry et al. once recognized C. echo as a subspecies of C.ladon (Cramer, 1780) in western Canada. In 2001, Guppy and Shepard nominated C. echo to the species level. Currently, many scientists agree that C.echo is a distinguished species.

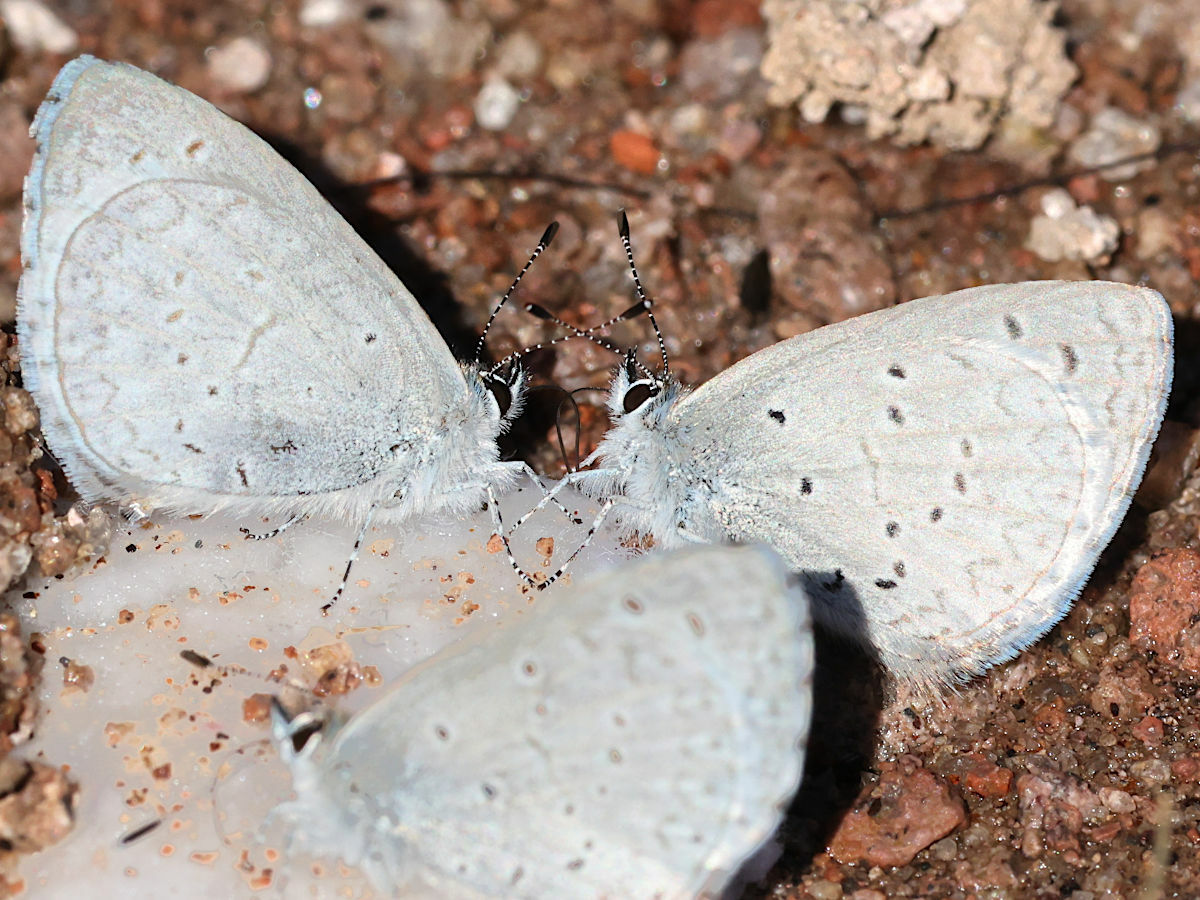
mud-puddling

== Subspecies ==
These five subspecies belong to the species Celastrina echo:

- Celastrina echo cinerea (W. H. Edwards, 1883) (Southwestern azure)
- Celastrina echo echo (W. H. Edwards, 1864) (Pacific azure)
- Celastrina echo nigrescens (J. Fletcher, 1903) (Northwestern azure)
- Celastrina echo sidara (Clench, 1944) (Rocky Mountain azure)
- Celastrina echo gozora (Boisduval, 1870)(Mexican Azure)

== Physical identification and relationship with ants ==
The butterflies in the Lycaenidae family in general are usually flat as larvae. The adult individuals are usually small and have hairy, ringed antenna-like tails. Their wings are mostly bright glowing blue and green. A large portion of Lycaenidae butterflies are found to have different associations with ants, either mutualistic, parasitic, or predatory.

C. echo in particular is usually pale blue-grey with small black spots or dashes. Based on the limited observations reported and the life history records of the other blue butterflies (Polyommatini), C. echo's known life history starts with eggs laid on the flower buds of its host plants. Attended and protected by the ants, C. echo's larvae feed on the flower buds and flowers while ants receive sugar-rich honeydew from them throughout the larval lifespan. C. echo then may pupate within ant nests. Some Lycaenidae species become parasites or even predator within the ant nest. The specific relationships to ants in the later life stage of C. echo are not quite clear.

== Host plants, habitat, and flight period ==
The C. echo larval foodplants are mainly composed of Ceanothus (California wild lilac), Spiraea (Holodiscus), Aesculus (California buckeye), Rubus (blackberries), and some legumes. The adults' host plants are also very diverse. They mostly feed on nectar from plants including the larval host plants listed above, Heteromeles (toyon), Rhamnus, and several others.

C. echo are often observed in woodlands, shrublands, and near mountain streams: places that have woody host plants they feed on. Depending on the moisture and relative condition of the larval hostplants, C. echo may fly in 1-2 or more broods from early spring to the fall (around February to late June, July, or even till October if there is no severe cold weather).
