= Celastrina albocoeruleus =

Albocerulean

Scientific classification
- Domain: Eukaryota
- Kingdom: Animalia
- Phylum: Arthropoda
- Class: Insecta
- Order: Lepidoptera
- Family: Lycaenidae
- Genus: Celastrina
- Species: C. albocoeruleus

Binomial name
- Celastrina albocoeruleus (Moore, 1879)

Synonyms
- Lycaenopsis albocoerulea

Species of butterfly

Celastrina albocoeruleus, the albocerulean, is a small butterfly found in India that belongs to the lycaenids or blues family.

== Description ==
Male upperside, forewing: blackish brown, a central patch that occupies the lower apical portion of the cell and the basal halves of interspaces 2 and 3 white; lightly suffused with iridescent lilacine (lilac-coloured) blue; this colour is intensified and spreads upwards over the dark brown along the basal portion of the costa, inwards right up to the base of the wing, downwards over three-fourths of the dorsal area from base and outwards from the white patch towards the termen; the ground colour occupies the apex very broadly, and posteriorly forms a broad border to the termen. Hindwing: lilacine blue, base and costal margin broadly suffused with fuscous; a large subapical patch diffusely white; finally, an anteciliary line black. Cilia of both forewings and hindwings white, turning to brown towards the apex of the forewing. Underside: white, the terminal markings generally prominent in other forms, more or less obsolescent in both forewings and hindwings in all specimens that the writer has seen. Forewing: the slender short line on the discocellulars and the discal transverse series of short detached lines pale brown, the latter sinuous and anteriorly curved inwards. Hindwing: three subbasal spots in transverse order, a spot below the middle of the costa not larger or more prominent than the others, and an irregular discal series of elongate spots, pale brown. Antenna, head, thorax and abdomen dark brown, the antenna ringed with white; beneath: the palpi, thorax and abdomen white.

Female upperside, forewing: a beautiful lilacine blue with a white central patch that occupies the lower apical half of the cell and the basal three-fourths of interspaces 3, 4 and 5; apex of wing and upper portion of termen broadly black, the inner border of this colour curving from a preapical point on the costa to apex of vein 3, thence the black continued as a slender anteciliary line to the tornus. Hindwing: white shaded with pale lilacine blue at base and broadly along the costal and dorsal margins; a slender anteciliary black line. Cilia as in the male. Underside: similar to that of the male, all the markings slighter, more delicate, and on the hindwing more irregular. Antennae, head, thorax and abdomen as in the male.

== Taxonomy ==
The butterfly was earlier known as Lycaenopsis albocoerulea Moore.

== Range ==
It is found from Shimla in India to the Karens in Myanmar.

== See also ==
- List of butterflies of India
- List of butterflies of India (Lycaenidae)
