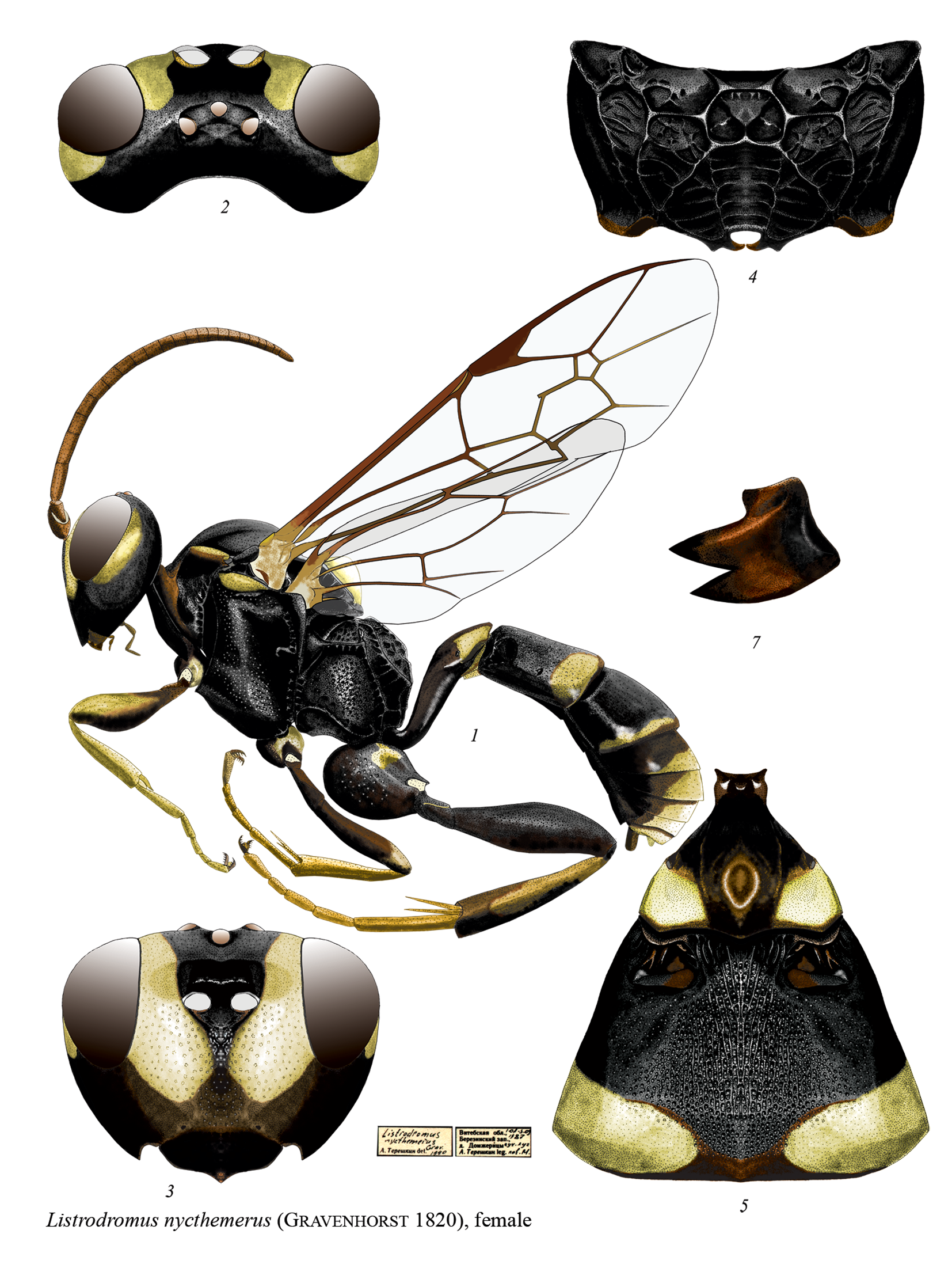

Scientific classification
- Kingdom: Animalia
- Phylum: Arthropoda
- Clade: Pancrustacea
- Class: Insecta
- Order: Hymenoptera
- Family: Ichneumonidae
- Genus: Listrodromus
- Species: L. nycthemerus

Binomial name
- Listrodromus nycthemerus (Gravenhorst, 1820)

Synonyms
- Ichneumon nycthemerus Gravenhorst, 1820; Listrodromus quinqueguttatus (Gravenhorst, 1829)

= Listrodromus nycthemerus =

Species of wasp

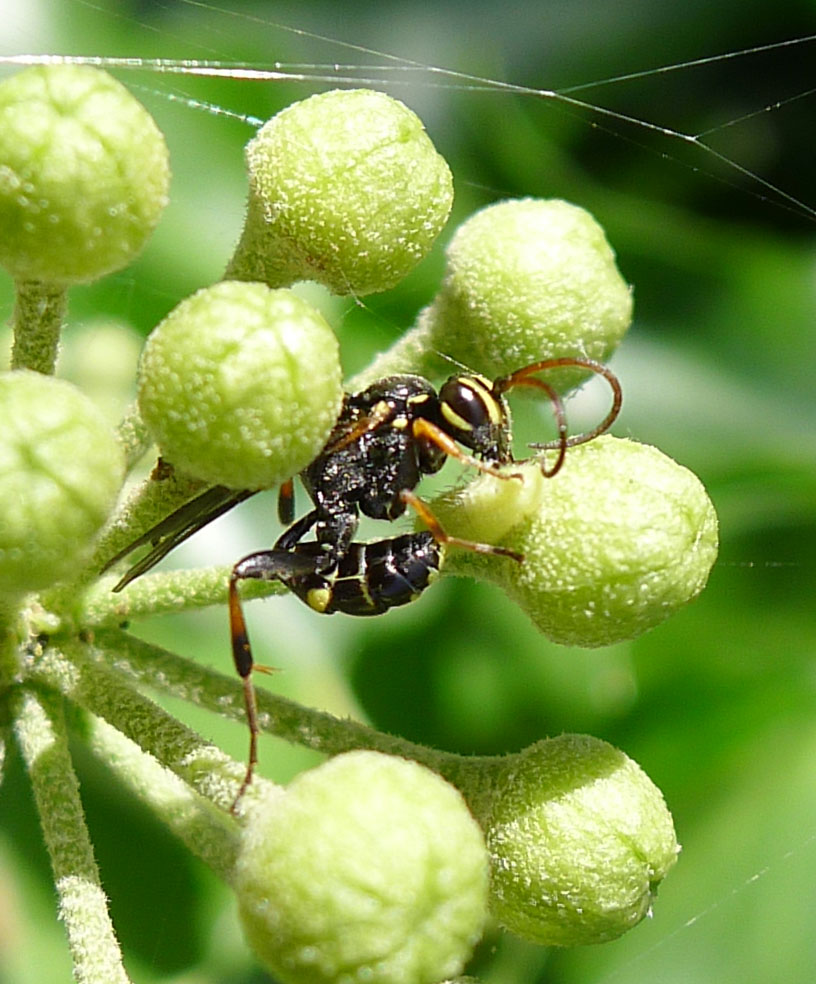
Listrodromus nycthemerus (probable) depositing egg inside caterpillar egg

Listrodromus nycthemerus, the holly blue Darwin wasp, is a species of ichneumon wasp belonging to the family Ichneumonidae. This species is a parasitoid, its sole host species being the holly blue butterfly (Celastrina argiolus).

== Taxonomy ==
Listrodromus nycthemerus was first formally described as Ichneumon nycthemerus by the German zoologist Johann Ludwig Christian Gravenhorst from Piedmont. This species was classified in the new genus Listrodromus in 1845 by Constantin Wesmael, this species being the type species of that genus. Traditionally the genus was included in the tribe Listrodromini within the subfamily Ichneumoninae but is now classified within tribe Ichneumonini.

== Description ==
Listrodromus nycthemerus is a very small wasp which is predominantly black and yellow. This species has a body length of 8–9 mm (0.31–0.35 in).

== Distribution ==
Listrodromus nycthemerus has been recorded from Europe where records come from Ireland, Great Britain, Netherlands, France, Spain, Germany, southern Norway, southern Sweden, southern Finland, Croatia and Austria.

== Life cycle ==
Listrodromus nycthemerus is a parasitoid of the holly blue, and has no other known host. The wasp lays an egg on a first instar caterpillar of the holly blue, inserting the egg into the caterpillar's body and the adult wasp emerges from the chrysalis, killing the chrysalis before its emergence. The population of the butterfly is tracked by that of the wasp, when holly blue populations are low the wasp population falls and this allows the butterfly population to increase and the population of L. nycthemerus can increase as there are more hosts available to be parasitised. The wasp population takes 6 or 7 years to reach its peak and at its peak as many as 99% of the holly blue caterpillars will be host to a larval wasp, causing the host population to crash.
