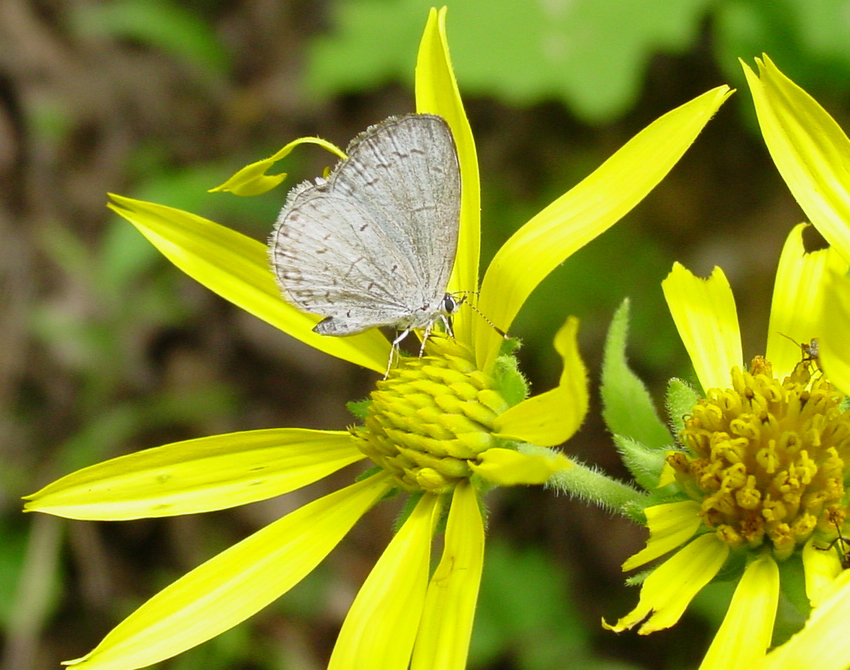

Conservation status
- Apparently Secure (NatureServe)

Scientific classification
- Kingdom: Animalia
- Phylum: Arthropoda
- Clade: Pancrustacea
- Class: Insecta
- Order: Lepidoptera
- Family: Lycaenidae
- Genus: Celastrina
- Species: C. neglectamajor

Binomial name
- Celastrina neglectamajor Opler & Krizek, 1984

Synonyms
- Celastrina neglecta-major

= Appalachian azure =

Species of butterfly

The Appalachian azure (Celastrina neglectamajor) is a butterfly in the gossamer wings family Lycaenidae. The male is light blue on the upperwing with a narrow, dark line running along the edge of the forewing. The underwing is chalky white and is dotted with small, pale dark spots. The very back of the hindwing has a row of dark spots running along the edge and contained by a faint zigzagging band. Females are similar to the males but have broad dark wing borders instead of the male's narrow ones. The adult butterfly has a 1.1–1.4-inch (2.8–3.6 cm) wingspan. It is the largest azure in the area.

The Appalachian azure is found throughout the central and southern Appalachian Mountains from Pennsylvania to Georgia and has a few isolated records from Missouri, Kentucky, and Ohio. It lives in moist deciduous woodlands with plenty of shade and streamsides near these forests. Males often gather in groups near mud puddles by these streamsides. The species is listed as endangered in Connecticut.

The adult butterflies only lay one set of eggs. The azure's eggs are laid singly on the flower buds of a host plant, though several eggs may be on the same plant. The eggs are a pale green. The larvae range in coloration from a yellowish green in the early stages of life to a reddish brown. They typically have an incomplete dark dorsal band and the greener caterpillars may have pale white markings. The Appalachian azure's larvae are specialists, living on and only eating the flowers of the black cohosh (Actaea racemosa).

The adult azure typically lives for a few weeks from mid-May to late June. It is temporally separated from similar species of azure in its range by living as a butterfly after the similar spring azure but before the summer azure.

The scientific name neglecta-major was coined in 1908 by Tutt as a 'form', describing the late spring generation of Celastrina argiolus pseudargiolus. In their authoritative monograph on the Lycaenopsis group of Polyommatine genera, Eliot & Kawazoe treated pseudargiolus as a synonym of ladon, Cramer, 1780. Thus the according to neglectamajor of specific status is very doubtful.

Although this species is not threatened with extinction, its habitat may be threatened by the spread of the garlic mustard (Alliaria officinalis). Additionally, black cohosh is being harvested from the wild for use as a dietary supplement. Wild harvesting of medicinal plants can lead to low numbers of those plants.
