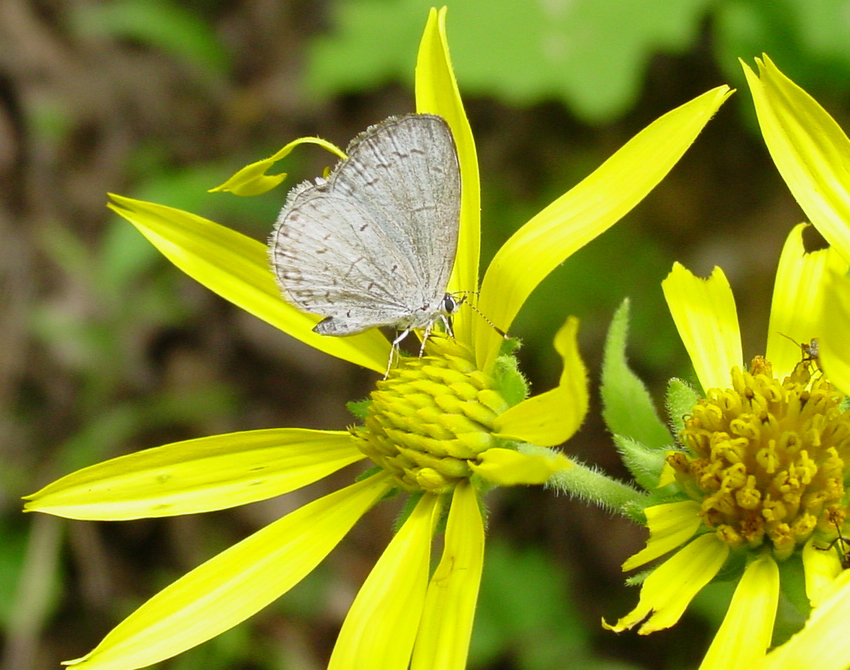
- Celastrina neglectamajor

Scientific classification
- Kingdom: Animalia
- Phylum: Arthropoda
- Class: Insecta
- Order: Lepidoptera
- Family: Lycaenidae
- Subfamily: Polyommatinae
- Tribe: Polyommatini
- Genus: Celastrina; J. W. Tutt, 1906

Synonyms
- Cyaniriodes Matsumura, 1919; Maslowskia Kurentzov, 1974

= Celastrina =

Butterfly genus in family Lycaenidae

Celastrina is a genus of butterflies in the family Lycaenidae found in the Palearctic, Nearctic, Indomalayan and Australasian realms.

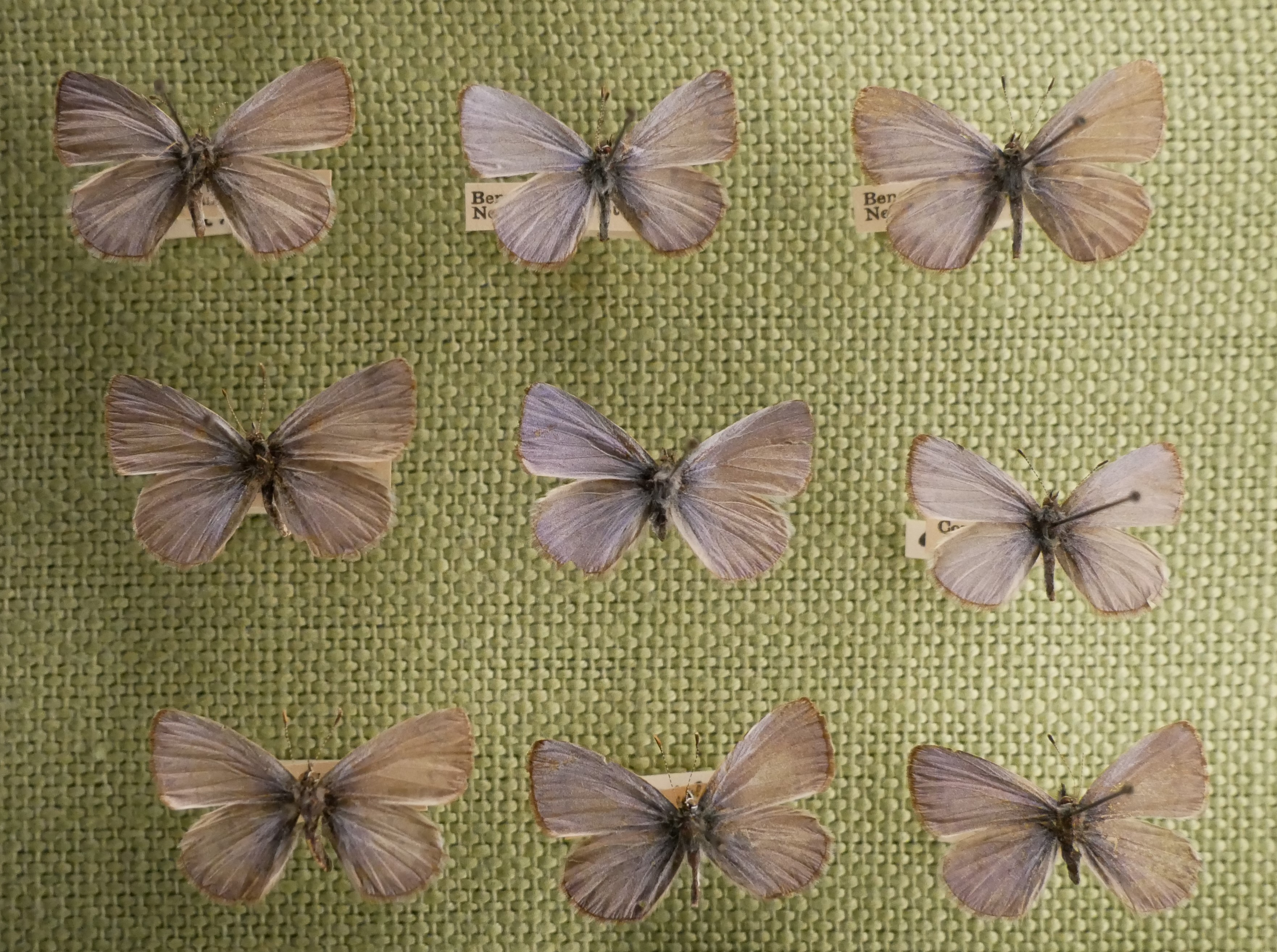
Celastrina ladon museum specimens

== Species ==
Listed alphabetically:

- Celastrina acesina (Bethune-Baker, 1906) – south-eastern Papua New Guinea
- Celastrina albocoeruleus (Moore, 1879) – albocerulean
- Celastrina algernoni (Fruhstorfer, 1917) – Philippines (Luzon) and Borneo
- Celastrina argiolus (Linnaeus, 1758) – holly blue
- Celastrina asheri (Labar, Pelham & Kondla, 2022) ) – Asher's blue
- Celastrina cardia (Felder, 1860) – pale hedge blue
- Celastrina dipora (Moore 1865) – dusky blue Cupid
- Celastrina echo (Edwards, 1864) – echo azure – California, Oregon
- Celastrina fedoseevi Korshunov & Ivonin, 1990 – Transbaikalia, Amur Oblast
- Celastrina filipjevi (Riley, 1934) – Ussuri, northeast China, Korea
- Celastrina gigas (Hemming, 1928) – western Himalayas, Fujian
- Celastrina gozora (Boisduval, 1870) – Mexican azure
- Celastrina hersilia (Leech, [1893]) – Nepal to China
- Celastrina huegeli (Moore, 1882) – large hedge blue
- Celastrina humulus (Scott & Wright, 1998) – hops azure – Colorado
- Celastrina idella (Wright & Pavulaan, 1999) – holly azure
- Celastrina iynteana (De Nicéville, 1883) – Jyntea hedge blue
- Celastrina iryna (Pavulaan, 2025)
- Celastrina ladon (Cramer, [1780]) – spring azure
- Celastrina ladonides (De L'Orza, 1869) – silvery hedge blue
- Celastrina lavendularis (Moore, 1877) – plain hedge blue
- Celastrina lucia (Kirby, 1837) – Lucia azure or boreal spring azure
- Celastrina morsheadi (Evans, 1915) – Tibet
- Celastrina neglecta (Edwards, 1862) – summer azure
- Celastrina neglectamajor Opler & Krizek, 1984 – Appalachian azure
- Celastrina nigra (Forbes, 1960) – spring sooty, dusky azure, or sooty azure – eastern United States
- Celastrina ogasawaraensis (Pryer, 1886) – Japan
- Celastrina oreas (Leech, [1893]) – Ussuri, China, (including Tibet and Taiwan), Nepal, northeast India (Assam), Burma, Korea
- Celastrina perplexa Eliot & Kawazoé, 1983 – China (Kangding)
- Celastrina phellodendroni Omelko, 1987 – Ussuri
- Celastrina philippina (Semper, 1889) – Borneo, Palawan, Philippines, Talaud, Moluccas, West Irian, Papua New Guinea, Bachan, Halmahera, Ternate, Timor, Sulawesi, Sula Islands, Ambon Island, Serang, Obi Islands
- Celastrina serotina Pavulaan & Wright, 2005 – cherry gall azure
- Celastrina sugitanii (Matsumura, 1919) – Japan, Sakhalin, Korea, northeast China
