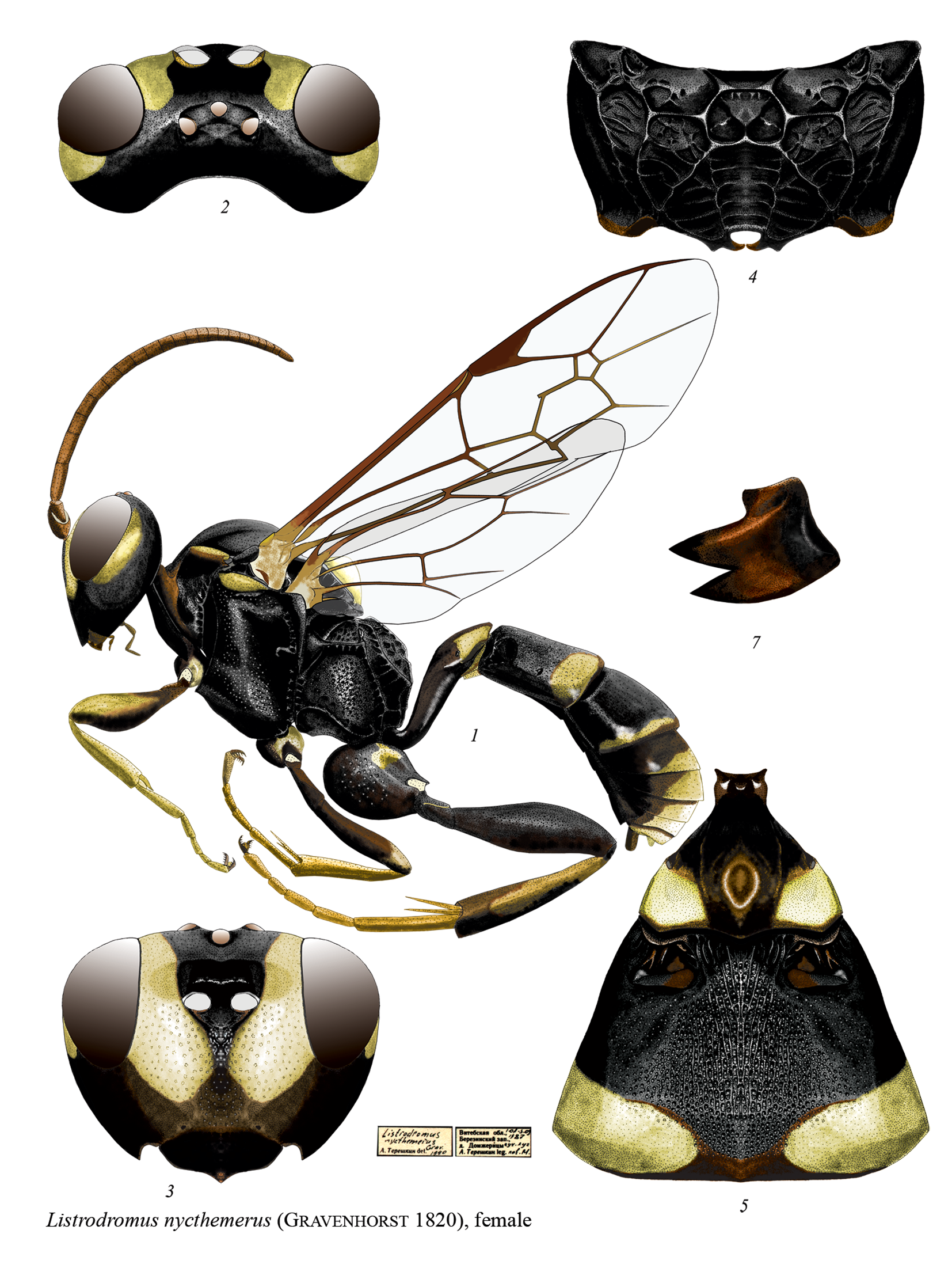
- Listrodromus nycthemerus

Scientific classification
- Kingdom: Animalia
- Phylum: Arthropoda
- Clade: Pancrustacea
- Class: Insecta
- Order: Hymenoptera
- Family: Ichneumonidae
- Tribe: Ichneumonini
- Genus: Listrodromus; Wesmael, 1845

Type species
- Listrodromus nycthemerus (Gravenhorst, 1820)

= Listrodromus =

Genus of wasps

Listrodromus is a genus of ichneumon wasps belonging to the family Ichneumonidae. These wasps are parasitoids of butterflies of the family Lycaenidae, laying eggs in the caterpillars.

== Species ==
The following species are classified in the genus:

- Listrodromus berndi Heinrich, 1975
- Listrodromus crassipes (Cameron, 1907)
- Listrodromus flavomaculatus Riedel, 2011
- Listrodromus javae Heinrich, 1975
- Listrodromus nycthemerus (Gravenhorst, 1820)
- Listrodromus propodealis Riedel, 2011
- Listrodromus rufiventris Riedel, 2023
- Listrodromus simplex Heinrich, 1934
