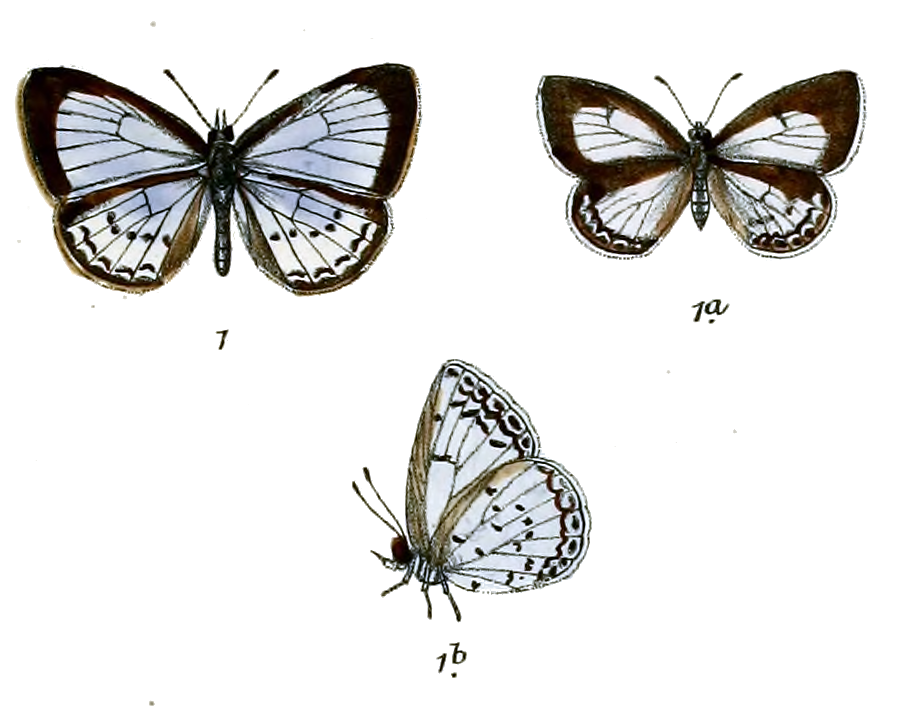

Scientific classification
- Domain: Eukaryota
- Kingdom: Animalia
- Phylum: Arthropoda
- Class: Insecta
- Order: Lepidoptera
- Family: Lycaenidae
- Genus: Celastrina
- Species: C. iynteana

Binomial name
- Celastrina iynteana (de Nicéville, 1883)

Synonyms
- Lycaenopsis jynteana

= Celastrina iynteana =

Jyntea hedge blue

Species of butterfly

Celastrina iynteana, the Jyntea hedge blue, is a small butterfly found in India that belongs to the lycaenids or blues family.

== Description ==
Male upperside: purplish blue or lilac of a deeper shade than in C. dilecta. Forewing: a much broader dusky-black terminal margin that widens at apex and is somewhat diffuse along its inner edge. In specimens of the dry-season brood there is a diffuse but prominent discal white patch. Hindwing: costa dusky brownish; termen with a comparatively narrow black border edged on the inner side by a more or less obscure subterminal series of black spots, each spot centred in a background which is slightly paler than the lilac ground colour. Underside: pale greyish white or bluish white, with the usual pale brown markings which are small, delicate and regular. Antenna, head, thorax and abdomen blackish brown, antennae ringed with white; beneath: palpi, thorax and abdomen white.

Female: "Upperside fore wing: all but the middle of the disc (which is white glossed with iridescent blue black; a discocellular black spot. Hind wing: blackish; white in the middle glossed with blue; along the veins irrorated with black scales; a submarginal series of pale lunules. Underside: both wings marked exactly as in the male." (de Nicéville)

== Taxonomy ==
The butterfly was earlier known as Lycaenopsis jynteana (de Nicéville).

== Range ==
It is found from Sikkim in India to Dawnas.

== See also ==
- List of butterflies of India
- List of butterflies of India (Lycaenidae)
