= Celastrina cardia =

Pale hedge blue

Scientific classification
- Domain: Eukaryota
- Kingdom: Animalia
- Phylum: Arthropoda
- Class: Insecta
- Order: Lepidoptera
- Family: Lycaenidae
- Genus: Celastrina
- Species: C. cardia

Binomial name
- Celastrina cardia (Felder, 1860)

Species of butterfly

Celastrina cardia, the pale hedge blue, is a small butterfly found in India that belongs to the lycaenids or blues family.

== Taxonomy ==
The butterfly was earlier known as Lycaenopsis cardia Moore.

== Range ==
It is found in Shimla in India to the Karen Hills in Myanmar.

== See also ==
- List of butterflies of India
- List of butterflies of India (Lycaenidae)
