= Celastrina ladonides =

Silvery hedge blue

Scientific classification
- Kingdom: Animalia
- Phylum: Arthropoda
- Class: Insecta
- Order: Lepidoptera
- Family: Lycaenidae
- Genus: Celastrina
- Species: C. ladonides

Binomial name
- Celastrina ladonides (De L'Orza, 1869)

Species of butterfly

Celastrina ladonides, the silvery hedge blue, is a small butterfly found in India that belongs to the lycaenids or blues family.

== Taxonomy ==
The butterfly was earlier known as Lycaenopsis ladonides Hemmings.

== Range ==
It is found from Murree in Pakistan to Kumaon in India.

== See also ==
- List of butterflies of India
- List of butterflies of India (Lycaenidae)
