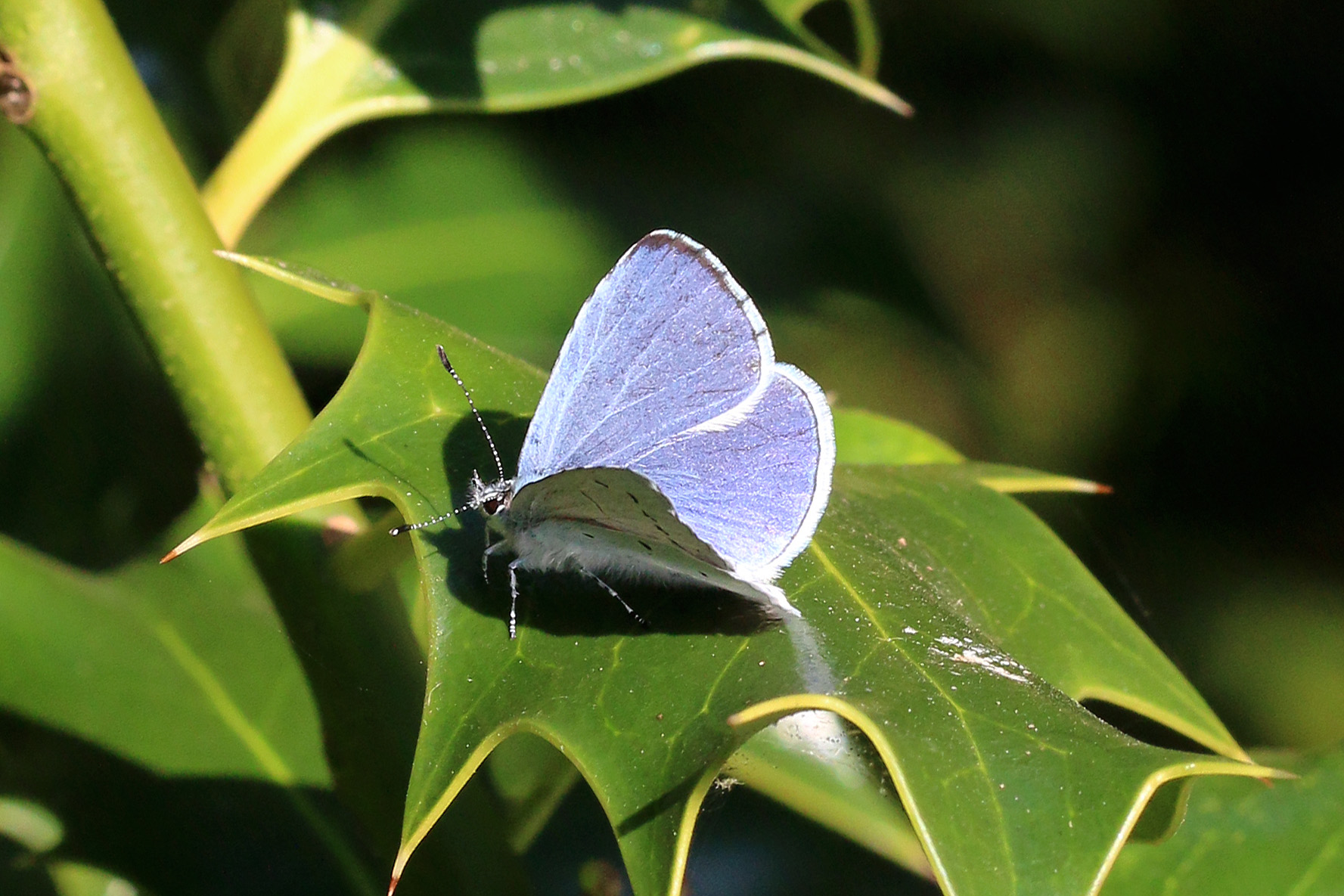
- Male
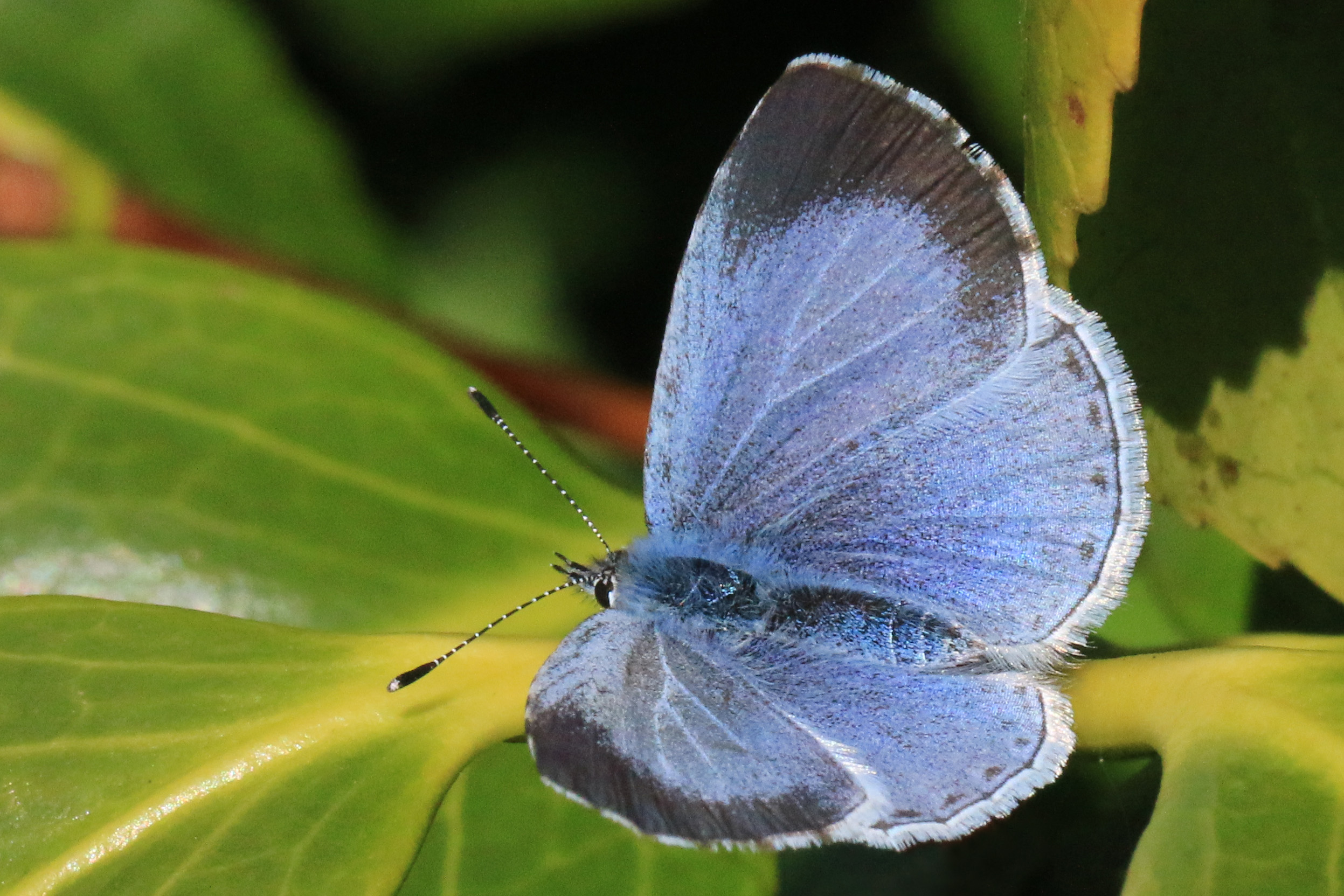
- Female both Cumnor Hill, Oxford, England

Conservation status
- Least Concern (IUCN 3.1)

Scientific classification
- Kingdom: Animalia
- Phylum: Arthropoda
- Clade: Pancrustacea
- Class: Insecta
- Order: Lepidoptera
- Family: Lycaenidae
- Genus: Celastrina
- Species: C. argiolus

Binomial name
- Celastrina argiolus (Linnaeus, 1758)

Synonyms
- Papilio cleobis Sulzer, 1776; Papilio thersanon Bergstrasser, 1779; Papilio argyphontes Bergstrasser, 1779; Papilio argalus Bergstrasse, 1779; Papilio (Argus) marginatus Retzius, 1783; Lycaenopsis argiolus calidogenita Verity, 1919; Lycaenopsis argiolus britanna Verity, 1919

= Holly blue =

Species of butterfly

The Holly blue (Celastrina argiolus) is a butterfly that belongs to the lycaenids or blues family and is native to the Palearctic.

== Common names ==
The common name Holly blue is derived from the association of the larval stage with the Holly tree.

In India, C. argiolus is known as the hill hedge blue.

== Description ==
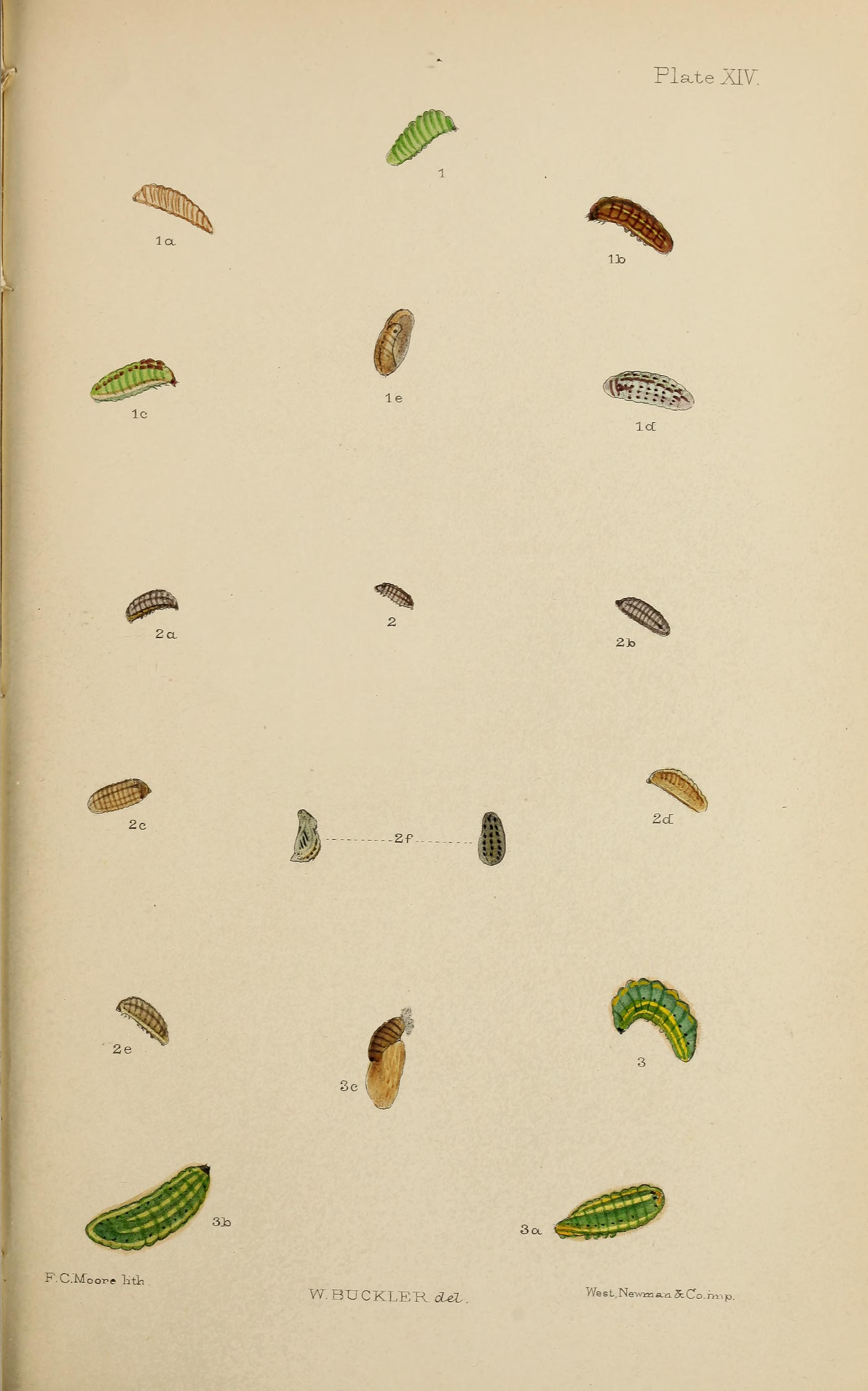
Figs 1, 1a, 1b larva after last moult, from holly 1c, 1d larva after last moult, from ivy 1e pupa from holly

The holly blue has violet-blue wings and pale silver-blue underwings with black dots. Seitz describes it:

Male above shining violet blue, only the apical portion of the costal margin being minutely edged with white. The female has both wings broadly bordered with dark, the margin of the hindwing bearing vestiges of ocelli. Underside silver-white, in the disc a row of black dots, some of which are elongate, and before the margin blackish shadowy dots. Egg very flat, whitish. Larva green or brown, marked with yellowish white, bearing catenulate (chain-like) stripes on the back, on segment 7 a gland to attract ants; head brown. On Ivy, Ilex, Euonymus, Rhamnus, Robinia, Genista, Spartium, Astragalus, Rubus, Erica, Pyrus and many other plants; in Europe visited usually by ants of the genus Lasius; in June and the autumn. Pupa mostly fastened to the underside of a leaf, ochreous with brown spots and markings. The butterflies in the spring and again in July, occasionally a third time at the end of August and in September, everywhere common, particularly at the flowers of ivy and brambles

In Europe the larvae of the first generation (the spring generation) feed mainly on the holly species Ilex aquifolium (the flower buds, berries, and leaves), but the second generation (the summer generation) uses a range of food plants including Spindle, Dogwoods, Ivy, and Bramble.

The wingspan is around 2.6 to 3.4 cm.

The Holly blue usually perches with its wings almost closed or at around 90 degrees.

The holly blue is the national butterfly of Finland.

== Taxonomy ==
This species was originally described as Papilio argiolus by Carl Linnaeus in 1758, and refers to the examples flying in Europe. In their monograph on the Lycaenopsis group of polyommatine genera, Eliot & Kawazoe, 1983, list 14 taxa as valid subspecies names, plus many further synonyms to which they accord lesser status. According to Eliot & Kawazoe, 1983, these 14 subspecies are divided into four groups as follows:

The argiolus group

Palaearctic & North African

- C. a. argiolus
- C. a. bieneri
- C. a. hypoleuca

=paraleuca Rober

- C. a. mauretanica

=algirica Oberthur

The kollari group

South and South-East Asian

- C. a. iynteana

=sikkima Moore
=victoria Swinhoe
=herophilus Fruhstorfer
=cition Fruhstorfer
=bothrinoides Chapman
=puspargiolus Chapman
=albocaeruloides Chapman

- C. a. kollari

=kasmira Moore
=coelestina Kollar
=trita Swinhoe

The ladonides group

Far Eastern

- C. a. caphis

=crimissa Fruhstorfer

- C. a. ladonides

=levettii Butler
=sachalinensis Esaki
=heringi Kardakoff

- C. a. sugurui

== Range ==
Found throughout Eurasia. It is particularly common in the south of Great Britain. In South Asia, it occurs from Chitral in Pakistan to Kumaon in India.

== Population cycle ==
The holly blue is subject to marked population cycles, which appear to be caused by interactions with the parasitoid ichneumon wasp Listrodromus nycthemerus. The wasp lays an egg on a holly blue caterpillar, inserting the egg into the caterpillar's body, and the adult wasp emerges from the chrysalis, killing the chrysalis before it does so. The population of the butterfly is tracked by that of the wasp: when butterfly populations are low the wasp population falls and this allows the butterfly population to increase and the population of L. nycthemerus can increase as there are more hosts available to be parasitised. As more caterpillars are parasitised the butterfly population crashes.

== Gallery ==
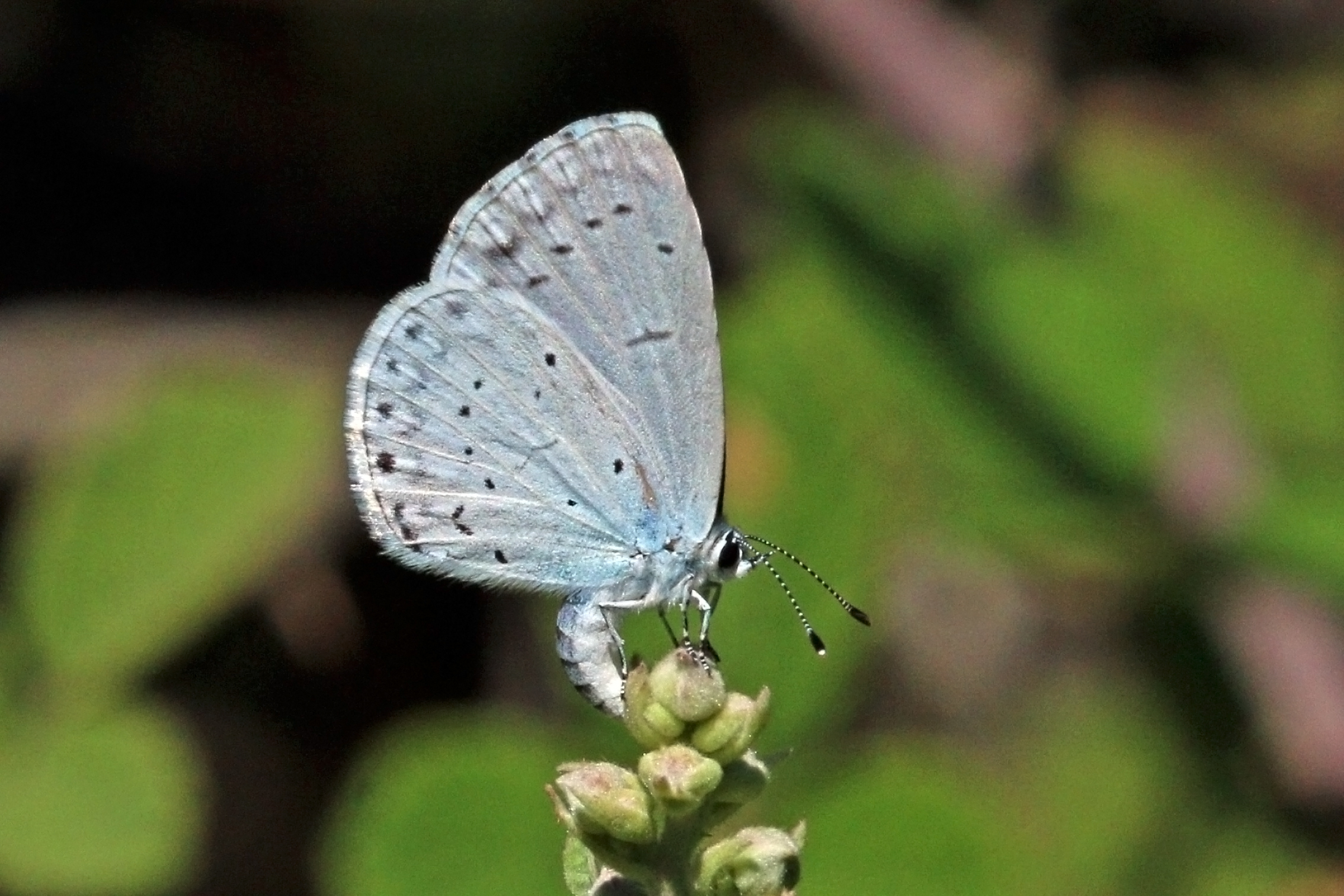
female laying egg, Bulgaria

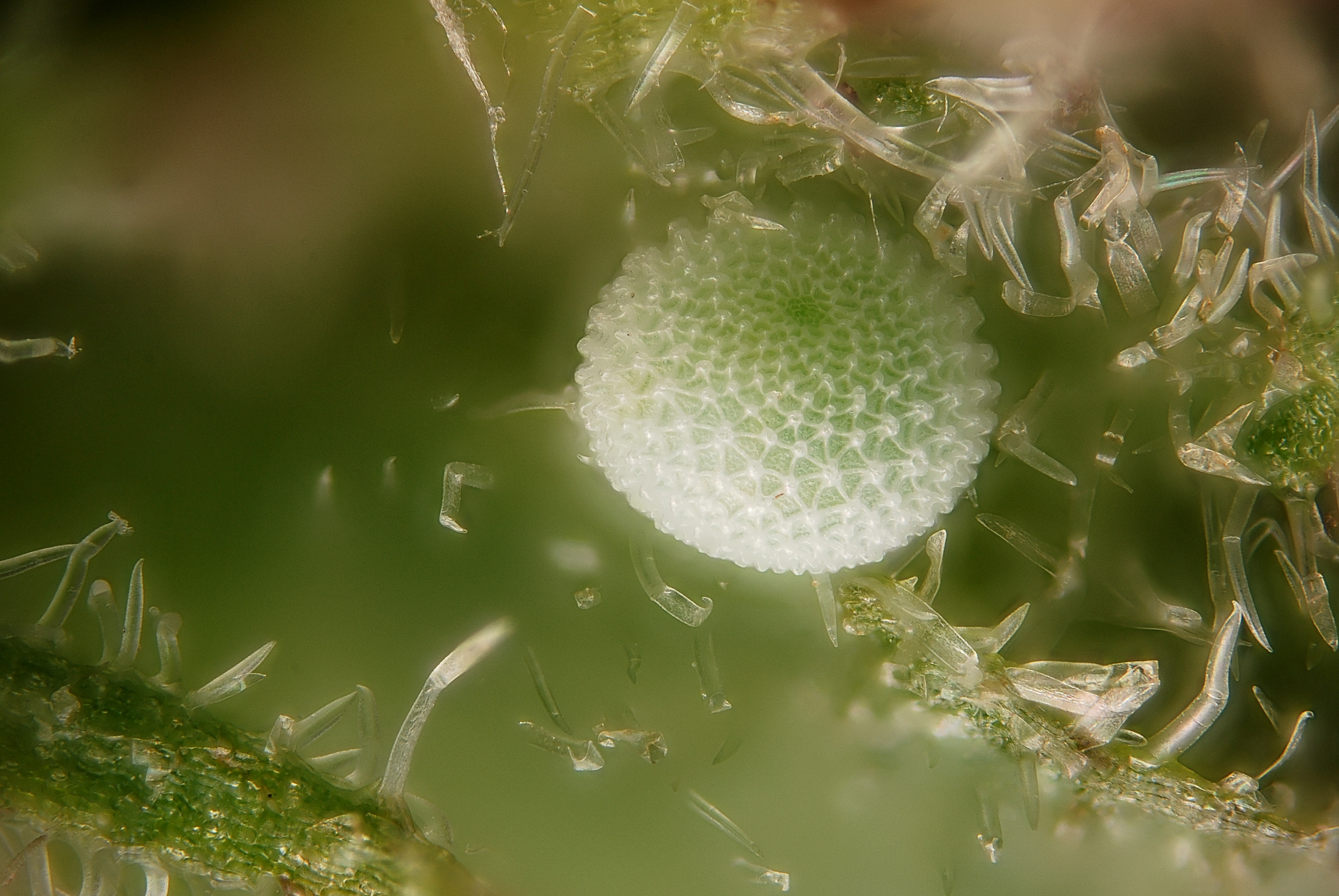
Egg

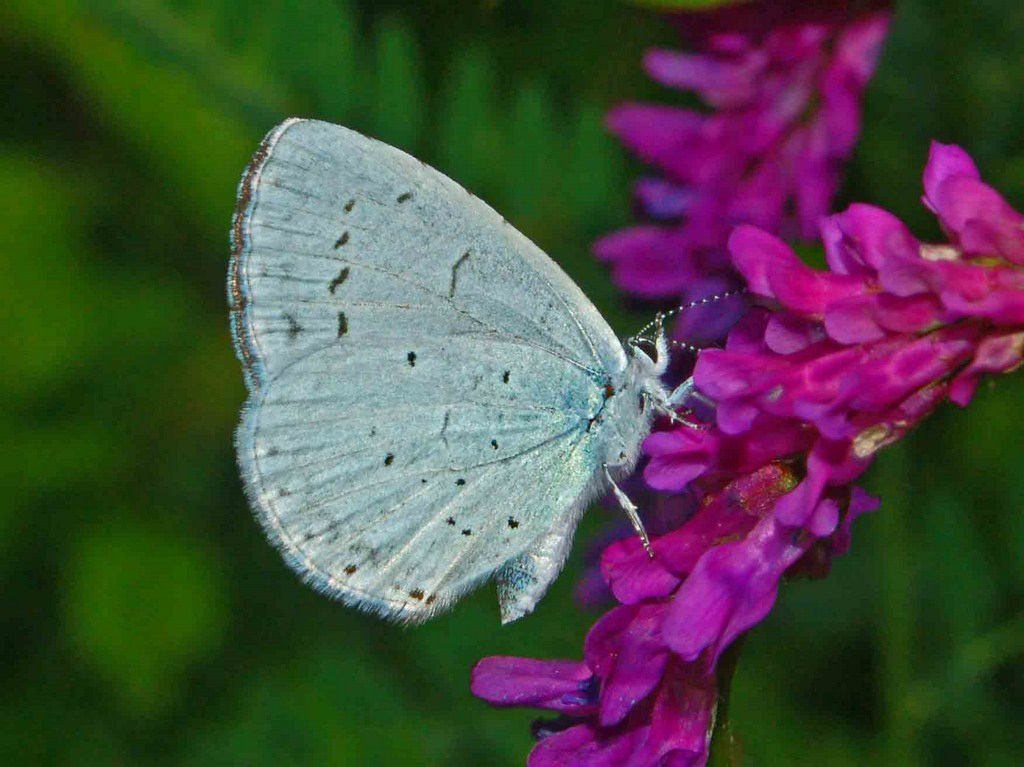
Imago

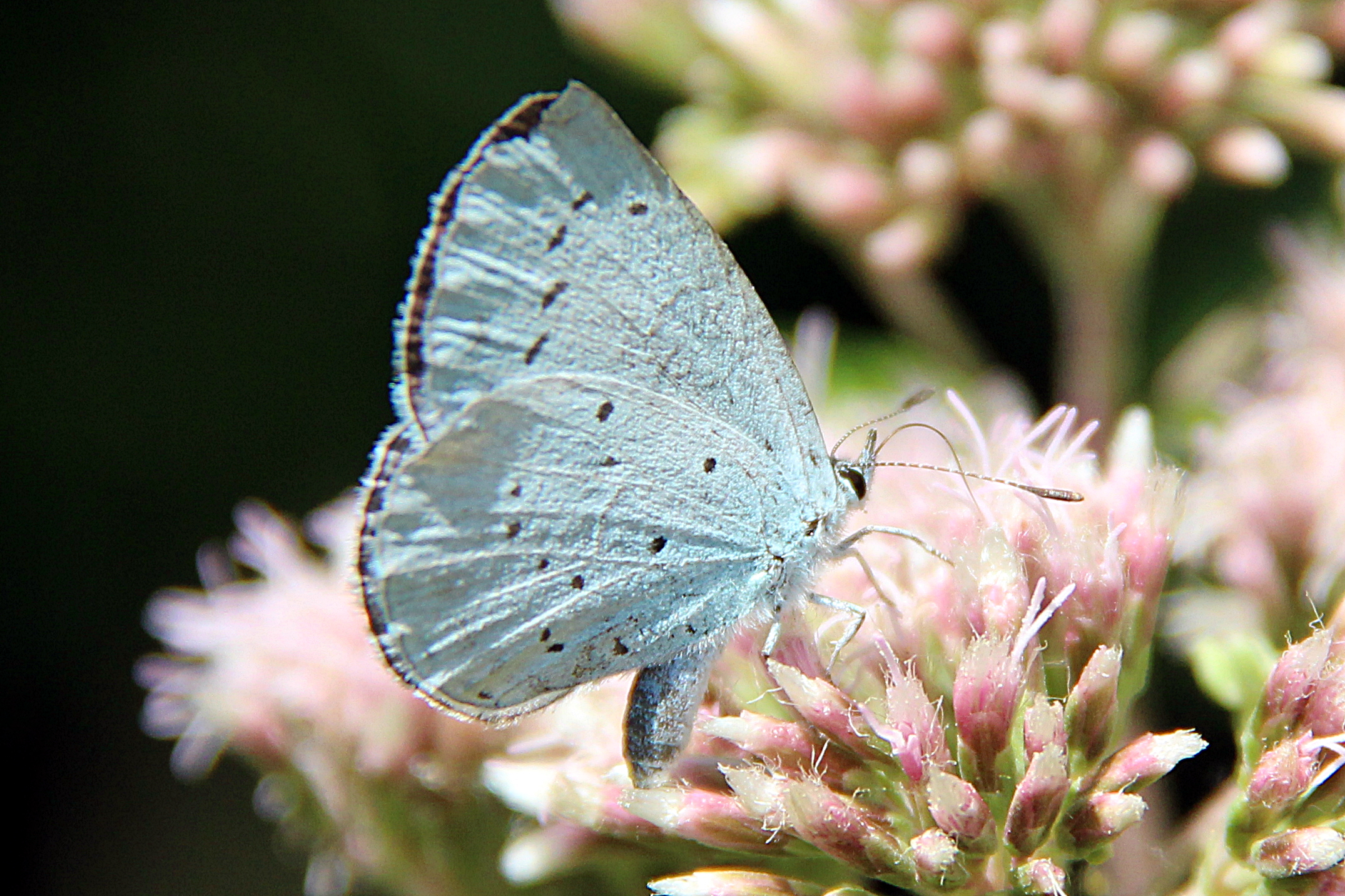
Female

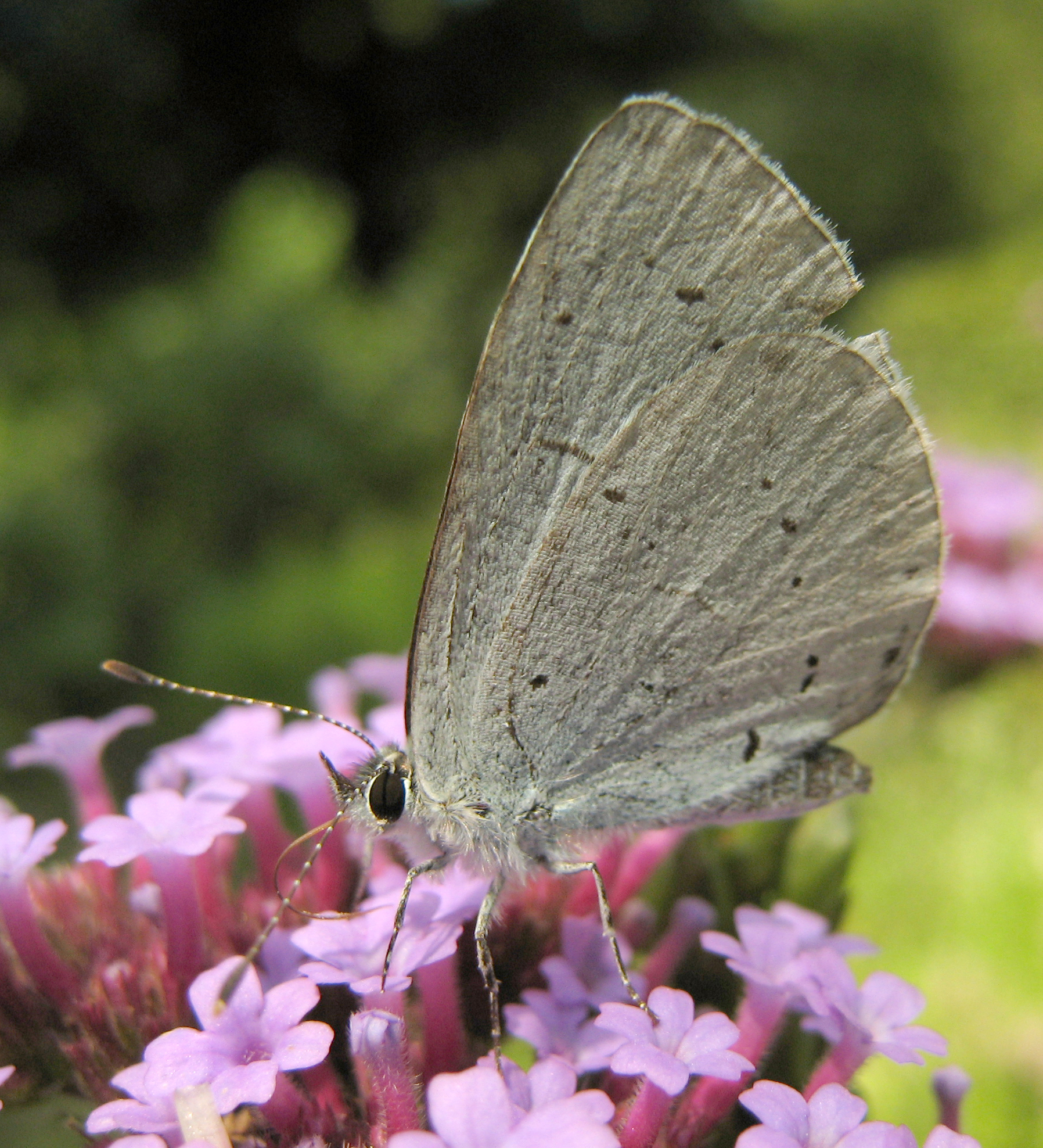
Undersides of the wings

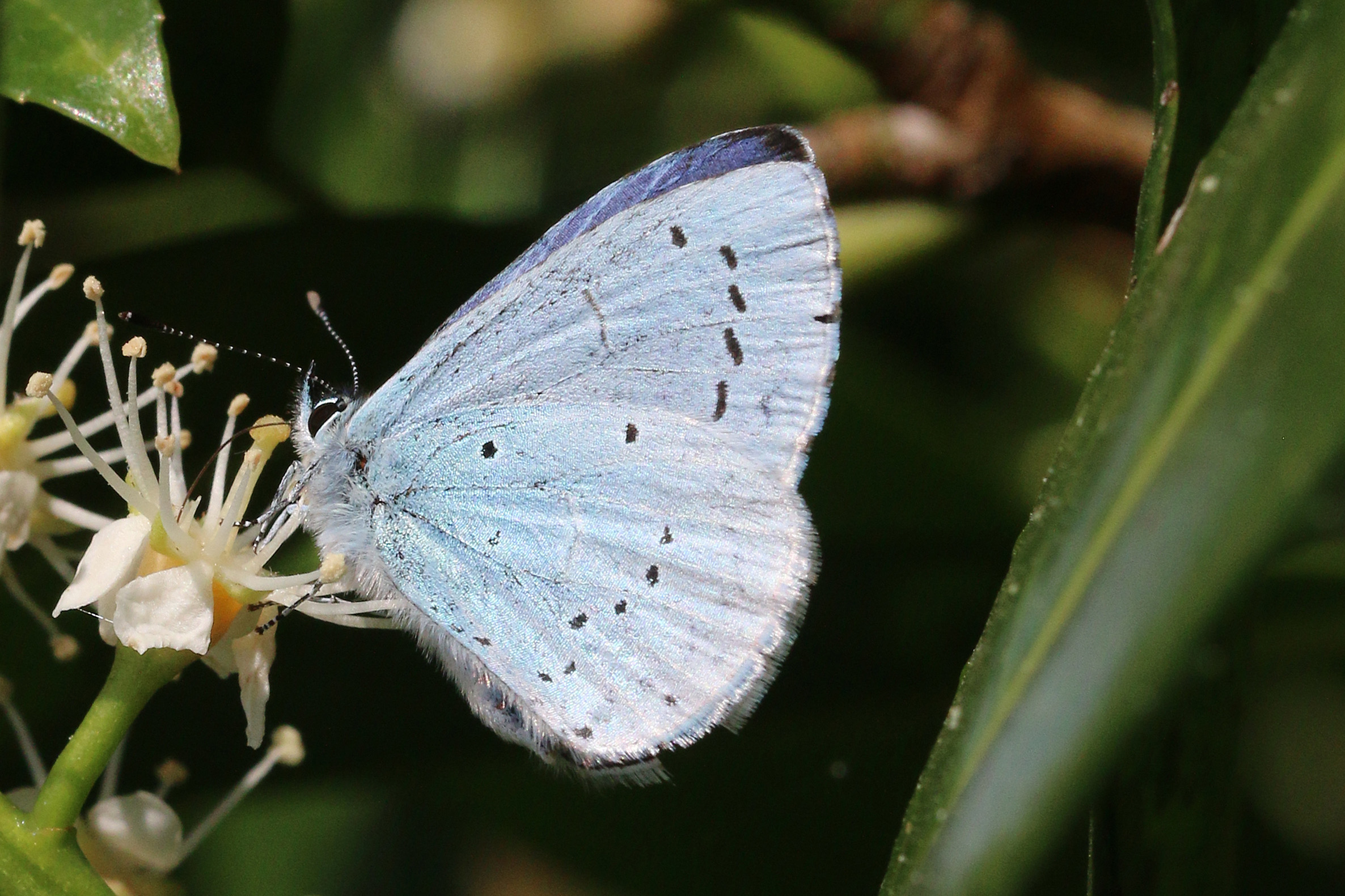
Male

== See also ==
- List of butterflies of Great Britain
