= Celastrina dipora =

Scientific classification
- Domain: Eukaryota
- Kingdom: Animalia
- Phylum: Arthropoda
- Class: Insecta
- Order: Lepidoptera
- Family: Lycaenidae
- Genus: Celastrina
- Species: C. dipora

Binomial name
- Celastrina dipora (Moore, 1865)

Species of butterfly

Celastrina dipora, the dusky blue cupid, is a small butterfly found in India that belongs to the lycaenids or blues family.
