= Save Me =

Save Me may refer to:

== Film and television ==
- Save Me, a 1994 film starring Lysette Anthony
- Sauve-moi (Save Me), a 2000 French film directed by Christian Vincent
- Save Me (film), a 2007 American film directed by Robert Cary
- Save Me (American TV series), a 2013 sitcom
- Save Me (British TV series), a 2018–2020 drama serial
- Save Me (South Korean TV series), a 2017 drama series
- Save Me (web series), a 2017–2019 Canadian comedy-drama series
- "Save Me" (Grey's Anatomy), a 2005 television episode
- "Save Me!" (Mike Tyson Mysteries), a 2016 television episode

== Music ==
=== Albums ===
- Save Me (Clodagh Rodgers album) or the title song (see below), 1977
- Save Me (Pat McGee Band album), 2004
- Save Me (Silver Convention album) or the title song (see below), 1975
- Save Me (Future EP), 2019
- Save Me (Empress Of EP), 2022

=== Songs ===
- "Save Me" (Aimee Mann song), 1999
- "Save Me" (Avenged Sevenfold song), 2010
- "Save Me" (Big Country song), 1990
- "Save Me" (BTS song), 2016
- "Save Me" (Clodagh Rodgers song), 1977; covered by several performers
- "Save Me" (DaBaby song), in honor of murder victim Iryna Zarutska, 2025
- "Save Me" (Darren Styles song), 2007
- "Save Me" (Dave Dee, Dozy, Beaky, Mick & Tich song), 1966
- "Save Me" (Fleetwood Mac song), 1990
- "Save Me" (Gotye song), 2012
- "Save Me" (Hinder song), 2012
- "Save Me" (Jelly Roll song), 2020
- "Save Me" (Joelle Hadjia song), 2014
- "Save Me" (Olly Murs song), 2025
- "Save Me" (Queen song), 1980
- "Save Me" (RBD song), 2005
- "Save Me" (Remy Zero song), 2001
- "Save Me" (Shinedown song), 2005
- "Save Me" (Silver Convention song), 1974
- "Save Me" (Tara Lyn Hart song), 2000
- "Save Me" (The Tea Party song), 1993
- "Save Me" (Wiktoria song), 2016
- "Save Me (This Is an SOS)", by Elena Paparizou, 2013
- "Save Me (Wake Up Call)", by Unwritten Law, 2005
- "Namida no Niji"/"Save Me", by Aya Ueto, 2007
- "Save Me", by 2 Chainz from So Help Me God!, 2020
- "Save Me", by Alter Bridge from Elektra: The Album, 2005
- "Save Me", by Architects from Ruin, 2007
- "Save Me", by Aretha Franklin from I Never Loved a Man the Way I Love You, 1967
- "Save Me", by Baboon from Ed Lobster, 1991
- "Save Me", by Bonnie Tyler from Bitterblue, 1991
- "Save Me", by Brandon Lake from Help!, 2022
- "Save Me", by Cane Hill from Kill the Sun, 2019
- "Save Me", by Damageplan from New Found Power, 2004
- "Save Me", by Dave Mason featuring Michael Jackson from Old Crest on a New Wave, 1980
- "Save Me", by Dave Matthews from Some Devil, 2003
- "Save Me", by Edguy from Rocket Ride, 2006
- "Save Me", by Embrace from Drawn From Memory, 2000
- "Save Me", by Fair Warning from Go!, 1997
- "Save Me", by Globus
- "Save Me", by Hanson from This Time Around, 2000
- "Save Me", by Heaven Shall Burn from Wanderer, 2016
- "Save Me", by Hollaphonic & Xriss, 2020
- "Save Me", by Hollywood Undead from Day of the Dead, 2015
- "Save Me", by In Flames from Battles, 2016
- "Save Me", by Irma from Faces, 2014
- "Save Me", by Jamie Drastik and Pitbull, 2011
- "Save Me", by Jem from Finally Woken, 2004
- "Save Me", by Johnny Logan from What's Another Year, 1980
- "Save Me", by k.d. lang from Ingénue, 1992
- "Save Me", by Kelly Osbourne from Sleeping in the Nothing, 2005
- "Save Me", by Keys N Krates, 2015
- "Save Me", by Killswitch Engage from Killswitch Engage, 2009
- "Save Me", by KMFDM from Attak, 2002
- "Save Me", by Krokus from One Vice at a Time, 1982
- "Save Me", by Lacuna Coil from Black Anima, 2019
- "Save Me", by Marc Broussard from Carencro, 2004
- "Save Me", by Marc E. Bassy, 2019
- "Save Me", by Melanie Safka from Photograph, 1976
- "Save Me", by MNDR, 2019
- "Save Me", by Morandi featuring Helene from N3XT, 2007
- "Save Me", by Muse from The 2nd Law, 2012
- "Save Me", by Neil Diamond from On the Way to the Sky, 1981
- "Save Me", by Nicki Minaj from Pink Friday, 2010
- "Save Me", by Overkill from From the Underground and Below, 1997
- "Save Me", by Pain from Nothing Remains the Same, 2002
- "Save Me", by Peter Cetera from One More Story, 1988
- "Save Me", by Poets of the Fall from Revolution Roulette, 2008
- "Save Me", by Public Image Ltd from Happy?, 1987
- "Save Me", by Royal Bliss from Life In-Between, 2009
- "Save Me", by Röyksopp from The Inevitable End, 2014
- "Save Me", by Saint Motel from The Original Motion Picture Soundtrack: Part 1, 2019
- "Save Me", by Skillet from Victorious, 2019
- "Save Me", by Smokey Robinson & the Miracles from Away We a Go-Go, 1966
- "Save Me", by Staind from The Illusion of Progress, 2008
- "Save Me", by Status Quo from In the Army Now, 1986
- "Save Me", by Steffany Gretzinger from Blackout, 2018
- "Save Me", by Village People from Live and Sleazy, 1979
- "Save Me", by Viva Hate, 2008
- "Save Me", by Wilson Pickett from Hey Jude, 1969
- "Save Me", by XXXTentacion from 17, 2017

== Other uses ==
- Save Me (animal welfare), an animal protection organisation co-founded by Brian May
- Save Me (webtoon), a 2019 South Korean webtoon

== See also ==
- Rescue Me (disambiguation)
- Rette mich (disambiguation)
- Save You (disambiguation)
- Somebody Save Me (disambiguation)
- "Saved Me", a 1989 song by Jenny Morris
