= Hamburg attack =

Hamburg attack may refer to:

== Hamburg, Germany ==
- Hamburg Uprising, 1923, the local Communist Party attempted to start a revolution
- Bombing of Hamburg in World War II, by the Allies
- 2016 Hamburg stabbing attack, an unsolved attack on a teenage couple
- 2017 Hamburg knife attack, a Palestinian killed one and injured others in a supermarket, hoping to become a martyr
- 2018 Hamburg stabbing attack, a man killed his wife and daughter at a railway station following a custody dispute
- 2023 Hamburg shooting, a mass shooting at a Jehovah's Witness Kingdom Hall
- 2025 Hamburg stabbing attack, a woman stabbed multiple people at the main railway station

== Elsewhere ==
- Hamburg Massacre, North Carolina, United States, 1876, white supremacist "Red Shirts" attacked blacks
