= 2016 Hanover stabbing =

2016 terrorist attack in Germany

The Hanover stabbing that occurred on 26 February 2016 was a terrorist stabbing of a police officer in Hanover, Germany, by a 15-year-old girl born to a Moroccan mother and a German father. She had been raised under the influence of salafist preachings, as early as 7 years. She had been investigated by the Federal Office for the Protection of the Constitution for preparing a serious crime already in 2014 and had traveled to meet ISIS members in Istanbul in November 2015. It was the first reported attack by an ISIS sympathiser in Germany.

== Incident ==
On 26 February 2016, two police officers approached a 15-year-old and asked for her identification papers. The girl stabbed a police officer in the back of the neck at Hanover Central Station, causing severe injuries. The officer survived after surgery. After her arrest, police found a second and larger knife. This was the first reported lone-wolf terrorist attack by a sympathizer of the Islamic State in Germany.

== Perpetrator ==
The 15-year-old perpetrator was born in Hanover to a Moroccan mother and a German father who converted to Islam. At age 7, she appeared in a video reciting the Quran with the German Salafist preacher Pierre Vogel.

In 2014, the Federal Office for the Protection of the Constitution, Germany's domestic intelligence agency, started investigating the girl for preparing a serious crime in 2014;

NDR television reported that the day after the November 2015 Paris attacks she described it as the "happiest day of my life", adding: "Allah bless our lions".According to a Deutsche Welle report, a family member called authorities expressing concerns over radicalisation, and police met with the family days later. In November 2015, the perpetrator traveled to Istanbul where she met members of ISIL, who planned to help her with entry into Syria. In January 2016 she returned to Germany. In January 2017, it was reported in court that orders to carry out a "martyrdom attack" in Germany were given.

In 2017, her older brother Saleh S. was convicted to 8 years in prison for attempted murder in 7 cases, as on 5 February 2016 he had thrown two Molotov cocktails into the main entrance of a shopping center in Hanover, Germany in order "to kill as many people as possible", according to his own statement in court.

== Trial and sentencing ==
The trial began in October 2016; the press were banned due to the accused being a minor. Safia S. was convicted of attempted murder, helping a terrorist organization, and of grievous bodily harm, and was sentenced to 6 years in prison. In 2018, the verdict was fully confirmed by the German Federal Court of Justice.

== Accomplice ==
Mohamad Hasan K., a man born in Syria, was accused of being an accomplice of Safia. S. and of planning a separate terror attack in 2015. As co-defendant of Safia S., he was sentenced to 2.5 years in jail as he knew of the attack but failed to alert the government.

== See also ==
- October 2016 Hamburg stabbing attack
