= Killing of Iryna Zarutska =

2025 stabbing in Charlotte, North Carolina, U.S.

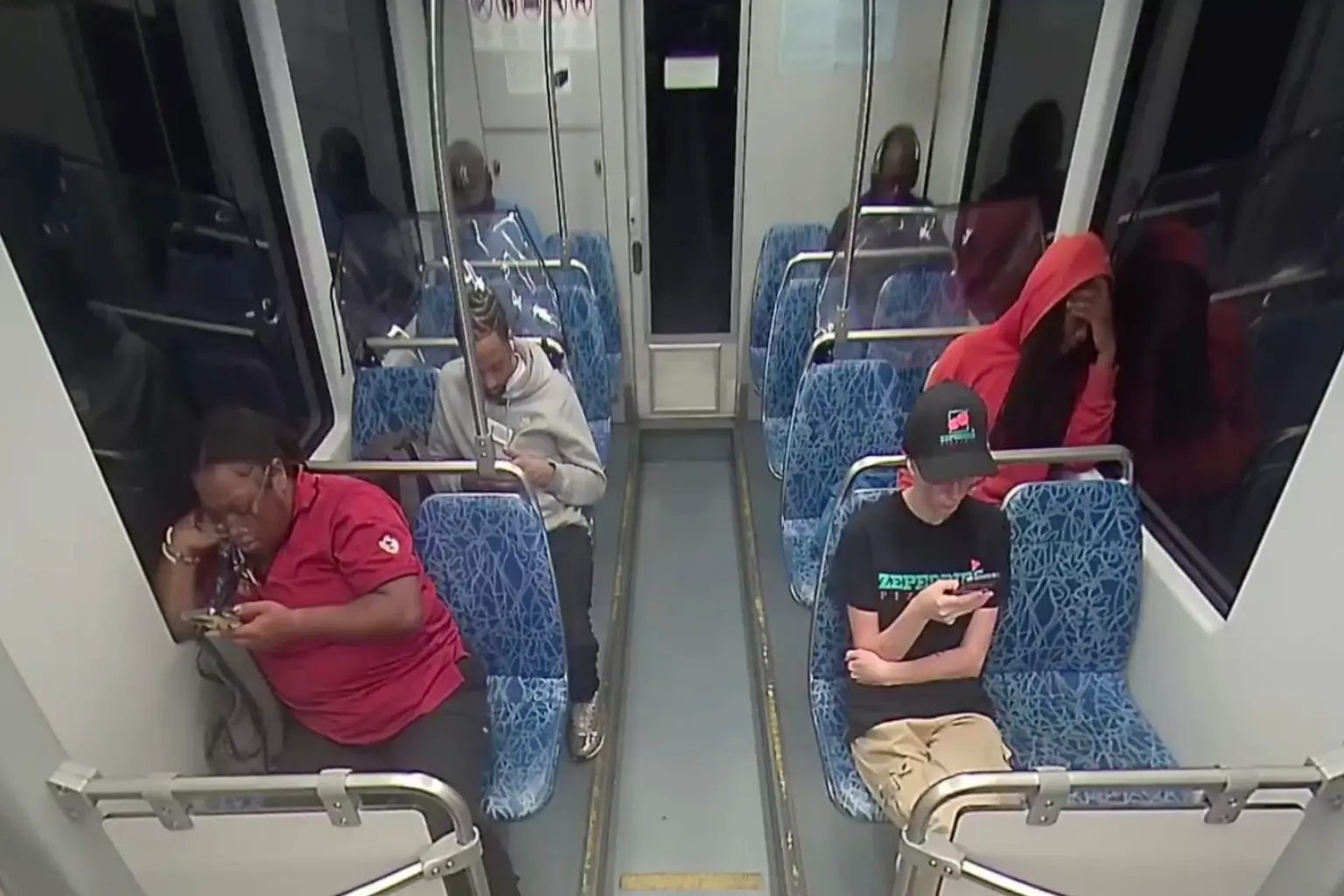
- Surveillance image showing Zarutska (right, sitting) and Brown directly behind her, moments before the stabbing
- Location: 35.211944°N 80.859167°W; East/West Boulevard station, Charlotte, North Carolina, U.S.
- Date: August 22, 2025; 9:50 p.m. EDT (UTC−4)
- Attack type: Stabbing
- Weapon: Foldable pocketknife
- Victim: Iryna Zarutska
- Accused: Decarlos Dejuan Brown Jr.
- Charges: First-degree murder (state); violation of 18 U.S.C. § 1992 (terrorist attacks and other violence against mass transportation systems) (federal)

On August 22, 2025, Iryna Zarutska, a 23-year-old Ukrainian woman, was killed at the East/West Boulevard station on the Lynx Blue Line, in Charlotte, North Carolina. Zarutska, a Ukrainian refugee who had fled her country because of the Russian invasion, was fatally stabbed from behind while seated on the train. The suspect, Decarlos Dejuan Brown Jr., was arrested upon exiting the train and charged with first-degree murder. He was deemed incompetent to stand trial on state and federal charges. In June 2026, he was involuntarily committed to a federal medical facility to restore his competency.

The killing gained national attention, prompting statements from local, state and federal politicians, with Republicans blaming Democrats for policies which they said contributed to the stabbing. Footage of the killing sparked outrage on some social media platforms, leading to discussions about transit security, fare enforcement, and gaps in the criminal justice and mental health systems. The killing resulted in the Cashless Bail Reporting Act being passed by the United States House of Representatives.

In North Carolina, the killing prompted the passage of House Bill 307, dubbed "Iryna's Law", which set out various criminal law reforms, including restricting cashless bail and seeking to resume capital punishment in the state. Republican Party leaders called the bill a key move to crack down on violent crime and repeat offenders, while moving toward resuming the state's death penalty; Democratic Party members argued the bill would not have prevented Zarutska's death.

== Background ==
=== Iryna Zarutska ===
Iryna Zarutska (Ukrainian: Ірина Заруцька, (Note: pronounced [iˈrɪnɐ zɐˈrut͡sʲkɐ]) May 22, 2002 – August 22, 2025) was born in Kyiv, Ukraine. She studied at Synergy College in Kyiv and earned a diploma in art and restoration, leaving at the age of 18. Following the 2022 Russian invasion, the Zarutska family's neighborhood of Solomianskyi was subjected to bombardments as part of the Battle of Kyiv. The family moved from their apartment to a small bomb shelter, where they lived for months.

In August 2022, Zarutska, her mother, her sister, and her younger brother immigrated to the United States, living with her aunt and uncle in Huntersville, North Carolina. Her father remained in Ukraine, as the martial law in effect prevented men between the ages of 18 and 60 from leaving the country. It was reported that he was unable to attend her funeral in the United States, but this was refuted by the State Border Guard Service of Ukraine. In Huntersville, Zarutska took various jobs and began learning English. Her boyfriend gave her driving lessons, since the family had never owned a car. She eventually moved to the NoDa neighborhood of Charlotte with her boyfriend, where she enrolled in college classes and found work at a pizzeria in Charlotte's Lower South End. On the night of the attack, Zarutska had finished a shift there and was commuting home on the Lynx Blue Line.

Following her death, Zarutska's family elected to bury her in the United States.

=== Decarlos Dejuan Brown Jr. ===
The 34-year-old suspect, Decarlos Dejuan Brown Jr. (born October 1, 1990), had been arrested 14 times in Mecklenburg County, North Carolina, before the stabbing, with criminal charges dating back to 2007. On April 11, 2014, he was convicted of breaking and entering into a residence in the Foxcroft neighborhood of Charlotte. While on probation, he was arrested for armed robbery and possession of a firearm by a felon. Brown was convicted of armed robbery and incarcerated in state prison in Raleigh, North Carolina from 2015 to September 2020. Upon release, he initially lived with his family, but his mother told ABC News that he was diagnosed with schizophrenia at this point and displayed violent behavior at home. His mother said that she had sought involuntary commitment, but that it was denied. The Associated Press reported that involuntary commitments are difficult to obtain unless a court finds the person to be dangerous. North Carolina reduced the capacity of state hospitals in the early 2000s, and the average wait time for a psychiatric bed was 16 days in 2024. After Brown stopped taking psychiatric medication, his mother took him to a homeless shelter. In January 2025, he made repeated 911 calls from the grounds of Novant Health Presbyterian Medical Center after speaking with the medical personnel there, claiming that a "man-made material" inside him was controlling his body. Instead of being immediately admitted, Brown was charged with misuse of 911 instead, and released without bond.

In January 2026, it was alleged that Brown had been granted early release from prison in February 2021 as part of measures to mitigate the spread of COVID-19 in the context of litigation against then-governor of North Carolina Roy Cooper by the American Civil Liberties Union and NAACP. The North Carolina Department of Adult Correction stated that Brown was not released early, and that he was released because his post-release supervision had been reinstated by a hearing officer.

== Killing ==
On August 22, 2025, Brown spent several hours riding on the Lynx Blue Line, during which surveillance footage showed him "making unusual movements" and laughing to himself. At 8:18 PM, he was passed by two Charlotte Area Transit System (CATS) security officials, but he did not interact with them. Local Charlotte television channel WBTV later quoted authorities as saying that Brown "did not have a ticket to ride the train".

CCTV footage showing the aftermath of the killing of Iryna Zarutska in August 2025

At 9:46 PM that evening, Zarutska boarded the Lynx Blue Line at the Scaleybark station in Charlotte's South End neighborhood. Surveillance footage shows Zarutska sitting in front of Brown, who was already seated on the train. Four minutes after Zarutska boarded, Brown pulled a pocketknife from his hoodie and stabbed Zarutska three times from behind, including at least once in the neck. No security personnel were present in the train car, though there were officers on board the train one car ahead. At least four other passengers were seated nearby during the attack.

Zarutska initially remained conscious or semi-conscious following the stabbing before collapsing to the floor within one minute. One of the witnesses exited the train, and the others remained seated. One and a half minutes after the stabbing, passengers from other parts of the train attempted to render aid. Among the many 9-1-1 calls received, one caller reported, "There are people around her right now. She looks young. I don't know. I don't think she's responsive right now. There's a lot of blood. I think she's dead. She's not responding."

After stabbing Zarutska, Brown stood a few feet in front of her seat, still holding the bloody knife, then walked away as Zarutska began bleeding out. After the attack, Brown is reported to have said "I got that white girl." Brown exited the train at the East/West Boulevard station two minutes following the stabbing, and was arrested by police on the platform. He was transported for treatment for a hand wound.

Zarutska was pronounced dead at the scene. A Federal Bureau of Investigation affidavit stated that she had one stab wound in the middle of her neck and a small cut on her left knee. An autopsy by the Mecklenburg County Medical Examiner's Office found that she had sustained three stab wounds: one in the neck injuring the right jugular vein, one in the right breast injuring the left carotid artery, and one in the left knee.

== Legal proceedings ==
Charlotte-Mecklenburg Police Department (CMPD) named Brown as the suspect in the killing; it did not disclose the motive for the attack. On August 23, 2025, Brown was charged with first-degree murder. On August 29, a judge ordered a 60-day psychological evaluation at Central Regional Hospital in Butner, North Carolina. On September 15, 2025, Brown was indicted by a grand jury for first-degree murder in Mecklenburg Superior Court. He was also indicted in United States District Court for the Western District of North Carolina on the federal charge of violence against a railroad carrier and mass transportation system resulting in death. He was taken into federal custody and held at the Mecklenburg County Detention Center without bond.

United States magistrate judge Susan Rodriguez appointed a capital defense lawyer to represent Brown alongside federal public defenders. In October 2025, it was announced that a Rule 24 court hearing to determine whether Brown would face the death penalty had been delayed to April 2026. On October 22, Brown was indicted by a federal grand jury for violence against a railroad carrier and mass transportation system. On December 11, Brown appeared in Charlotte federal court for the first time.

After Charlotte television station WSOC-TV filed a civil lawsuit seeking copies of audio and video recordings held by the Charlotte-Mecklenburg Police Department relating to the killing of Zarutska, lawyers acting for Brown filed an emergency motion seeking a federal injunction challenging the release on the basis that Brown would incur "irreparable harm to his rights to due process and a fair trial" should the recordings expose witnesses. The motion was granted by the United States Attorney for the Western District of North Carolina. WSOC-TV in turn challenged the injunction, arguing that Brown's lawyers violated the Anti-Injunction Act by asking a federal court to interfere with state proceedings.

In December 2025, Central Regional Hospital determined that Brown was incapable of proceeding to trial on the state charges. In April 2026, Brown's public defender filed a motion requesting Mecklenburg Superior Court to continue the case and delay a Rule 24 capacity hearing scheduled for April 30, 2026, for 180 days to allow time for further evaluation. In the same month, United States Assistant Attorney General Harmeet Dhillon stated that Brown would face a separate competency determination on the federal charges. In May 2026, Brown's defenders filed a motion seeking a federal competency hearing, noting that an examination by the Federal Bureau of Prisons had found Brown to be incapable of proceeding to trial on the federal charge and seeking a determination from a federal judge on Brown's competence. In June 2026, the US attorney's office for the western district of North Carolina said that Brown had been found incompetent to stand trial in a federal court.

The Zarutska family filed suit against the city of Charlotte and Professional Security Services on August 21, 2026, claiming negligence in Zarutska's death.

== Reactions ==
=== Local ===
Zarutska's death raised concerns about the safety of Charlotte's Lynx Blue Line. Charlotte City Council member Edwin Peacock III stressed fragile public trust and urged CATS and CMPD to review security. CATS confirmed the train operator followed protocol, holding the train until police arrived. On September 5, 2025, CATS released surveillance video of the stabbing, which soon went viral online. Following the killing, local officials and the district attorney publicly discussed gaps in Mecklenburg County's mental health and justice systems, using the case as an example in debates over how courts handle defendants with serious mental illness. Mayor Vi Lyles called the killing "senseless and tragic", and urged respect for the victim's family as the investigation continued.

Multiple Charlotte City Council officials and candidates in the 2025 Charlotte mayoral election called for greater action to ensure safety on public transit. Dimple Ajmera, another member of Charlotte City Council, said of the crime, "Clearly, our current safety policies are not enough", and expressed concern that fear of crime in the transportation system might affect an upcoming referendum to expand the city's light rail system. CATS said it would seek to increase fare inspections, install new ticket validators, and expand security staffing on trains and platforms. On September 22, Charlotte City Council agreed to expand the scope of Professional Police Services LLC, a private security contractor appointed to carry out safety monitoring on the Lynx Blue Line, to include sidewalks and other areas adjacent to transit centers. In December 2025, WBTV reported on safety concerns around the Blue Line in the context of a further stabbing, noting that CATS data showed a 10% decline in Blue Line passenger numbers in September 2025, followed by an 8% decline in October 2025. In February 2026, an audit by the Federal Transit Administration was released that identified 18 areas of non-compliance with federal requirements by CATS and required CATS to submit a corrective action plan within 30 days. In June 2026, CATS published data showing a year-on-year reduction in crime on the Blue Line.

=== State ===
North Carolina governor Josh Stein called for "more cops on the beat", for the state legislature to pass a law enforcement package to address vacancies, and for review of the pretrial system.

President pro tempore of the North Carolina Senate Phil Berger stated that he would seek to revive capital punishment in North Carolina, with no executions having taken place since 2006. Several Republican members of the North Carolina House of Representatives signed an open letter demanding the removal of the state court magistrate judge who released the suspect on his own recognizance following his arrest for a misdemeanor earlier in 2025.

In November 2025, a new House Select Committee on Involuntary Commitment and Public Safety was convened to examine the involuntary commitment process in North Carolina and make recommendations to improve it. In January 2026, the House Select Committee on Oversight and Reform scheduled a legislative hearing to discuss the killing, summoning Mecklenburg County Sheriff Garry McFadden, Charlotte Mayor Vi Lyles, and other city officials and requesting documents from Mecklenburg County District Attorney Spencer Merriwether. The hearing was postponed after a federal judge blocked Merriwether from releasing some documents. The oversight hearing was then held on February 9, 2026. Republican legislators questioned Mecklenburg County Sheriff Garry McFadden, who was facing a primary election.

==== Iryna's Law ====
North Carolina state lawmakers introduced a criminal law reform bill – House Bill 307, dubbed "Iryna's Law" – in the North Carolina General Assembly on September 22, 2025. Iryna's Law was passed 28–8 by the North Carolina Senate on September 22 and 81–31 by the North Carolina House of Representatives on September 23, and signed into law by Stein on October 3. Measures set out in Iryna's Law include:

- Removing cashless bail for certain offenses.
- Defining a category of violent offenses for which a judge or magistrate would be required to impose conditions for pretrial release such as GPS monitoring, including arson and murder.
- Establishing a protocol requiring court officials to order mental health evaluations where the defendant was charged with a violent offense and had been subject to an involuntary commitment order in the prior three years and/or where the defendant was charged with any offense and the court had reasonable grounds to believe they were a danger to themselves or others.
- Requiring appeals against death sentences to be heard by the end of 2027.
- Giving the North Carolina chief justice the ability to suspend magistrates.
- Establishing that the victim using public transportation at the time of the crime as an aggravating factor when seeking the death penalty.
- Directing the North Carolina Department of Adult Correction to identify another means of carrying out death sentences if lethal injection was declared unconstitutional or was not possible because the drugs needed for it were unavailable.
- Providing funding for 10 new assistant district attorneys and five new legal assistants in Mecklenburg County.

Iryna's Law came into effect on Monday, December 1, 2025. In November 2025, Mecklenburg County Sheriff Garry McFadden noted that the implementation could place more pressure on county jails. In December 2025, North Carolina Department of Health and Human Services deputy secretary for facilities and licensure Karen Burke suggested that the law could result in increased demand for behavioral health services. In March 2026, Wake County district attorney Lorrin Freeman noted that the law had reduced officials' discretion to grant pre-trial release, suggesting it could contribute to overcrowding in jails. In May 2026, McFadden announced the reopening of Charlotte's Jail North to address overcrowding. In June 2026, WLOS reported that the law had attracted "praise and pushback", with "supporters pointing to public safety benefits and critics raising concerns about its long-term impact on the criminal justice system".

==== House Bill 1104 ====
On April 29, 2026, representative Timothy Reeder introduced House Bill 1104, "Improve IVC Process and Enhance Public Safety", in the North Carolina General Assembly. The bill sets out reforms to the involuntary commitment process in North Carolina. Measures set out in the bill include:

- Directs the North Carolina Department of Health and Human Services (NCDHHS), the North Carolina Department of Information Technology, and the North Carolina Administrative Office of the Courts to review the involuntary commitment process, including considering the provision of clinical data to judges and magistrates and granting law enforcement access to certain court records.
- Directing NCDHHS to evaluate its training program for medical providers performing psychiatric evaluations of criminal suspects.
- Directing NCDHHS and local management entities/managed care organizations to develop plans for the use of mobile crisis units as part of the involuntary commitment process.
- Directing NCDHHS and the North Carolina Sheriffs' Association to develop a plan for using telehealth in county jails to complete first examinations of criminal suspects in custody.
- Directing UNC Health to explore improvements to state-run psychiatric facilities.
- Directing NCDHHS to develop a plan to address the shortage of staffed behavioral health beds in state-run facilities, including scoping the use of non-state entities to provide beds, spaces, and staff.
- Expanding the use of outpatient commitment, where people would be compelled to comply with a treatment plan while living in the community rather than being institutionalised.

In June 2026, House Bill 1104 was passed 100-10 by the North Carolina House of Representatives and referred to the North Carolina Senate. Following the passage, House Speaker Destin Hall stated, "Recent tragedies like the preventable murder of Iryna Zarutska have exposed serious failures in our mental health and public safety systems that put all North Carolinians at risk" and "These changes will make our state safer by keeping dangerous criminals with mental illnesses off the streets and getting them the care they need before they can harm others."

=== National ===
U.S. President Donald Trump speaking on the killing on September 9, 2025

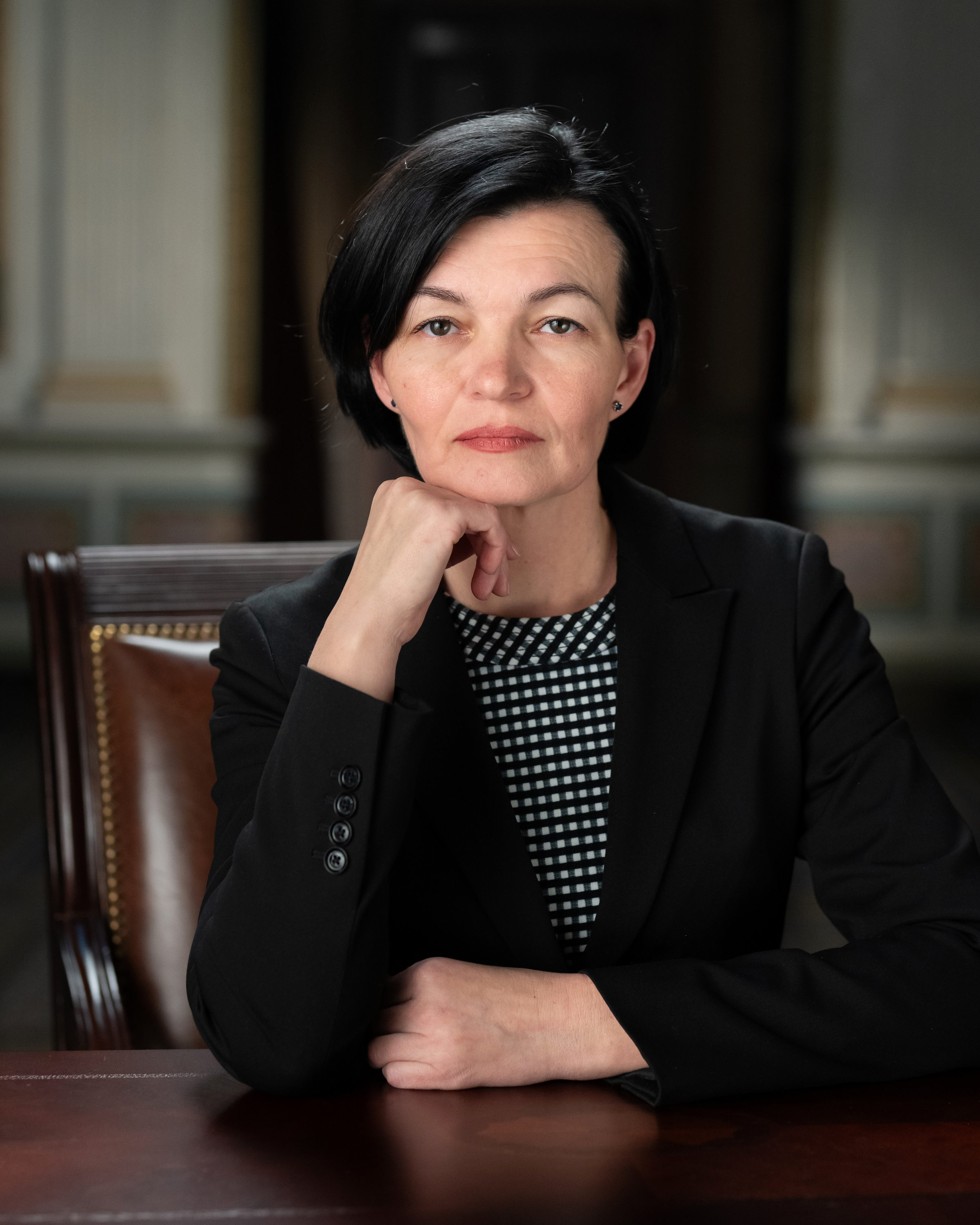
Iryna Zarutska's mother, Anna Zarutska, attended the 2026 State of the Union Address

The killing garnered national attention in the United States, particularly from right-wing political commentators, and was described by The Charlotte Observer as having become "politicized." Conservative commentators accused mainstream media of not covering the Charlotte killing, which involved a white victim and a black suspect, as heavily as the Jordan Neely case, where the situation was opposite. U.S. Secretary of Transportation Sean Duffy publicly blamed public transit and Charlotte City Council officials for the killing, and Elon Musk criticized judges and district attorneys for allowing "criminals to roam free."

Writing in The New York Times, Zeynep Tufekci likened the recurring replays of the graphic video of Zarutska's stabbing to a "snuff film," in a column about her death and the assassination of Charlie Kirk.

Speaking at the Museum of the Bible on September 8, U.S. President Donald Trump called the attacker a "madman" and "lunatic," and said that "when you have horrible killings, you have to take horrible actions. And the actions that we take are nothing," before blaming local officials in places like Chicago for failing to stop crime, and denounced cashless bail. On the same day, the White House released a statement criticizing "North Carolina's Democrat politicians, prosecutors, and judges" for "prioritizing woke agendas that fail to protect their citizens." On September 9, the White House released a video in which Trump said that Zarutska was "slaughtered by a deranged monster." On September 24, U.S. Vice President JD Vance discussed the killing in a visit to Concord, North Carolina, blaming it on "soft-on-crime policies" and stating he was "open" to deploying the North Carolina National Guard to Charlotte if requested by Governor Stein and Mayor Lyles. The U.S. House Committee on the Judiciary held a field hearing in Charlotte on September 29 on safety in public transit systems and the treatment of repeat offenders. In February 2026, Trump again referenced the killing during his 2026 State of the Union Address; Zarutska's mother was in attendance for the speech. Trump used the phrase "came in through open borders" in the speech, implying that Decarlos Brown Jr. was an immigrant, but he is reported to have been born in Charlotte, North Carolina. Trump also stated in February 2026 that "Repeat Violent Offender DeCarlos Brown Jr. was put on the streets by Radical Roy Cooper, and his soft-on-crime agenda".

The killing prompted Mark Harris (the Representative for North Carolina's 8th congressional district) to introduce House Resolution 5625, the Cashless Bail Reporting Act, which would require the United States Department of Justice to publish a list of state and local governments permitting cashless bail and the charges associated with each instance of bail. The bill was passed by the United States House of Representatives on May 14, 2026 by 301 to 116.

=== International ===
The case received international coverage, including in Ukraine, with the Ministry of Foreign Affairs of Ukraine stating it was "in constant contact" with investigators. Addressing the United Nations General Assembly on September 24, 2025, President of Ukraine Volodymyr Zelenskyy paid tribute to Zarutska.

In the United Kingdom, The Times noted that the case had "fuelled a debate about crime rates in the United States", while The Daily Telegraph noted the case has "triggered uproar over crime in the US". In June 2026, The Guardian—reporting on the murder of Henry Nowak—stated that "Among those eager to exploit the case of Novak, there is already a move to liken it to the killing of Iryna Zarutska".

== Memorials and tributes ==
On August 31, 2025, a candlelight vigil in Charlotte honored Zarutska and other recent victims of transit-related violence. A candlelight vigil organized by the Mecklenburg County Republican Party was held on September 22, 2025, at the East/West Boulevard station. The organizers proposed that the station be renamed the "Iryna Zarutska Light Rail Station".

In September 2025, American rapper DaBaby released the song "Save Me" dedicated to Zarutska, with a video re-enacting the event but with DaBaby saving Zarutska.

In October 2025, a newly described species of Celastrina butterfly from the coastal area of Georgia and South Carolina was named Celastrina iryna ("Iryna's Azure") in tribute to Zarutska.

Technology executive and Republican donor Eoghan McCabe established "Remember Iryna", a group aimed at delivering murals of Zarutska across the United States. In December 2025, Elon Musk announced he would donate $1,000,000 towards murals honoring Zarutska. Murals to Zarutska delivered as of April 2026 included those by Alice Steele in Abilene, Texas; by Ben Keller in the Bushwick, Brooklyn neighborhood of New York City, New York and in New Haven, Connecticut; by Gear Duran in Las Vegas, Nevada; and by "SAV 45" in North Center, Chicago and in Charlotte itself. In March 2026, an unfinished mural in Providence, Rhode Island by Ian Gaudreau became the subject of local controversy. Providence Mayor Brett Smiley called for its removal, labeling the project and its backers as "misguided" and "divisive." State Representative David Morales agreed with the Mayor that the mural "does not reflect Providence's values" and said the work was the result of a "right-wing movement" exploiting Zarutska's death to "spread division." On March 30, the owners of The Dark Lady, the gay club where the mural was located, announced they would discontinue the project and take down the unfinished work.

== See also ==
- 2025 Cambridgeshire train stabbing – Multiple stabbing in the United Kingdom
- 2025 Chicago train immolation – Immolation on a train in Chicago, Illinois
- Crime in North Carolina
- Crime in the United States
- Killing of Debrina Kawam – Fatal immolation in Brooklyn, New York
- Killing of Tim McLean – Murder of a 22-year-old man in Canada
