= Rescue Me =

Rescue Me may refer to:

== Film ==
- Rescue Me (film), a 1992 film starring Michael Dudikoff
- Rescue Me: Mave-chan, a 2005 original video animation spin-off of the novel series and anime Yukikaze

== Television ==
=== Shows ===
- Rescue Me (American TV series), a 2004–2011 drama series starring Denis Leary
- Rescue Me (British TV series), a 2002 romantic comedy series

=== Episodes ===
- "Rescue Me", Abot-Kamay na Pangarap episode 477 (2024)
- "Rescue Me", American Dreams season 2, episode 6 (2003)
- "Rescue Me", American Heiress episode 10 (2007)
- "Rescue Me", Baywatch season 11, episode 22 (2001)
- "Rescue Me", Boston Legal season 4, episode 14 (2008)
- "Rescue Me", Cheers season 3, episode 25 (1985)
- "Rescue Me", Diagnosis: Murder season 6, episode 16 (1999)
- "Rescue Me", Doc Martin series 7, episode 1 (2015)
- "Rescue Me", ER season 7, episode 7 (2000)
- "Rescue Me", Falcon Crest season 7, episode 13 (1988)
- "Rescue Me", First Yaya season 1, episode 6 (2023)
- "Rescue Me", Groomer Has It season 2, episode 8 (2009)
- "Rescue Me", Holby City series 13, episode 34 (2011)
- "Rescue Me", Just Shoot Me! season 2, episode 23 (1998)
- "Rescue Me", Knots Landing season 14, episode 4 (1992)
- "Rescue Me", Life Is Wild episode 10 (2008)
- "Rescue Me!", Maximum Exposure season 1, episode 10 (2000)
- "Rescue Me", Police Rescue season 4, episode 12 (1995)
- "Rescue Me", Providence season 3, episode 4 (2000)
- "Rescue Me", Sea Patrol season 1, episode 7 (2007)
- "Rescue Me", Shameless (British) series 9, episode 11 (2012)
- "Rescue Me", Survive This season 2, episode 11 (2010)
- "Rescue Me", The Bill series 25, episode 61 (2009)
- "Rescue Me", The Vampire Diaries season 5, episode 17 (2014)
- "Rescue Me", Two Guys and a Girl season 4, episode 10 (2000)

== Literature ==
- Rescue Me, a 2008 romantic fiction anthology by Cherry Adair, Lora Leigh, and Cindy Gerard
- Rescue Me, a 2012 novel by Rachel Gibson
- Rescue Me, a 2011 novel by Christopher Hart

== Music ==
=== Albums ===
- Rescue Me (soundtrack), from the American TV series, 2006
- Rescue Me, by John Rich, 2001
- Rescue Me, by Roy Buchanan, 1974

=== Songs ===
- "Rescue Me" (Bell, Book & Candle song), 1997
- "Rescue Me" (EuroGroove song), 1995
- "Rescue Me" (Fontella Bass song), 1965; covered by many performers
- "Rescue Me" (Madonna song), 1991
- "Rescue Me" (Marshmello song), 2019
- "Rescue Me" (OneRepublic song), 2019
- "Rescue Me" (Skepta song), 2010
- "Rescue Me" (Thirty Seconds to Mars song), 2018
- "Rescue Me" (Ultra song), 1999
- "Rescue Me" (You Me at Six song), 2011
- "Rescue Me"/"Smile Again", by Every Little Thing, 2000
- "SOS (Rescue Me)", by Rihanna, 2006
- "Rescue Me", by Al B. Sure! from In Effect Mode, 1988
- "Rescue Me", by the Alarm from Eye of the Hurricane, 1987
- "Rescue Me", by Black Stone Cherry from Kentucky, 2016
- "Rescue Me", by Buckcherry from Black Butterfly, 2008
- "Rescue Me", by Daughtry from Break the Spell, 2011
- "Rescue Me", by Dirty Heads, 2023
- "Rescue Me", by Freak of Nature from Freak of Nature, 1993
- "Rescue Me", by Hawthorne Heights from Fragile Future, 2008
- "Rescue Me", by In Case of Fire, 2024
- "Rescue Me", by the Hooters
- "Rescue Me", by Myka Relocate from The Young Souls, 2015
- "Rescue Me", by Pushmonkey from Year of the Monkey, 2005
- "Rescue Me", by Slaughterhouse from Welcome to: Our House, 2012
- "Rescue Me", by A Taste of Honey from Twice As Sweet, 1980
- "Rescue Me", by Tokio Hotel from Scream, 2007
- "Rescue Me", by Y&T from Earthshaker, 1981
- "Rescue Me", by Zebrahead from MFZB, 2003

== See also ==
- Rette mich (disambiguation)
- Save Me (disambiguation)
