= 2025 Chicago train immolation =

Immolation on a train in Chicago, Illinois

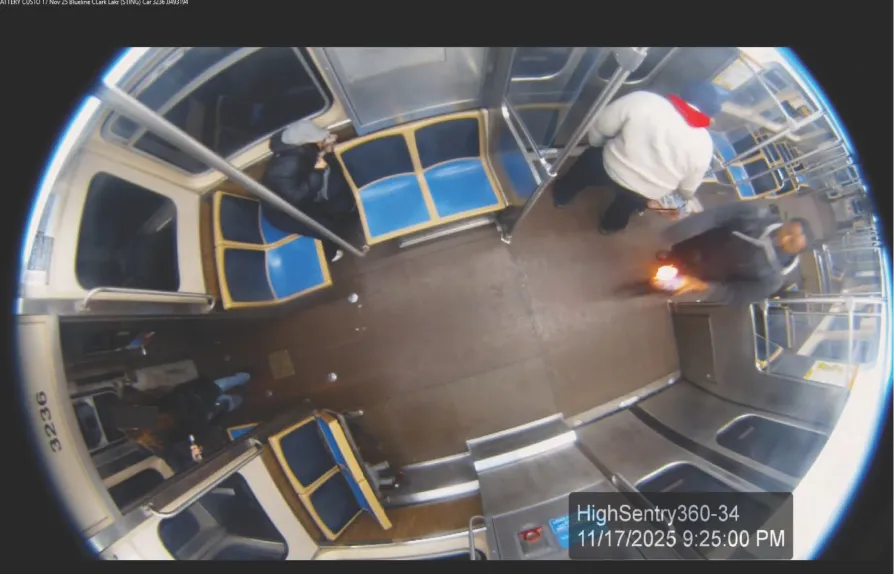
- MaGee (left) moments before being set on fire by an assailant (right) holding a flaming bottle
- Location: 41°53′8.76″N 87°37′51.19″W; Chicago, Illinois, United States
- Date: November 17, 2025; 9:25 p.m. (CST)
- Target: Train passenger
- Attack type: Targeted immolation
- Weapons: Gasoline, lighter
- Deaths: 0
- Injuries: 2 (including the perpetrator)
- Victim: Bethany MaGee
- Motive: Under investigation
- Accused: Lawrence Reed
- Charges: Federal- 18 U.S.C. § 1992 (terrorist attacks and other violence against mass transportation systems)
- Judge: Laura McNally

On November 17, 2025, a 26-year-old woman, Bethany MaGee, was set on fire in an immolation attack on a Blue Line train in Chicago, Illinois, United States. MaGee survived with critical injuries. The suspected assailant, Lawrence Reed, who had 72 prior arrests, was arrested and charged with federal terrorism charges. The case gained both local and national attention and was mentioned by U.S. President Donald Trump and his administration.

== Incident ==
A few minutes prior to 9:30 p.m. on Monday, November 17, 2025, Reed allegedly approached MaGee from behind on a Chicago Transit Authority (CTA) Blue Line train car, holding an iced tea bottle filled with gasoline. Without provocation, Reed allegedly began pouring gasoline on MaGee, who briefly fought him off and attempted to escape. Reed allegedly ignited the bottle as he held it, pursued MaGee, "cornered her," and used the bottle to light her on fire. Passengers witnessed the attack but did not intervene.

According to a later criminal complaint, MaGee was "almost fully engulfed in flames" for a period of about one minute, and she rolled on the floor of the train car, trying to put herself out. When the train pulled to a stop at Clark/Lake station, MaGee was able to exit before collapsing on the platform. Finally, as recounted by U.S. Attorney for the Northern District of Illinois Andrew S. Boutros, two "good Samaritans" extinguished the fire. As alleged by Assistant United States Attorney Aaron Bond, throughout the incident Reed allegedly watched MaGee burn "as if nothing was happening".

== Victim ==
Bethany MaGee, a 26-year-old woman, was transported to a hospital in critical condition "with severe burns to her face and body," according to a criminal complaint. Reportedly, "more than half of her body was burned" in the attack. As of December 18, she remained hospitalized in critical condition. MaGee has been described as a "gentle spirit" by her family. MaGee was discharged from Stroger Hospital's burn ward on February 5, 2026.

== Accused ==
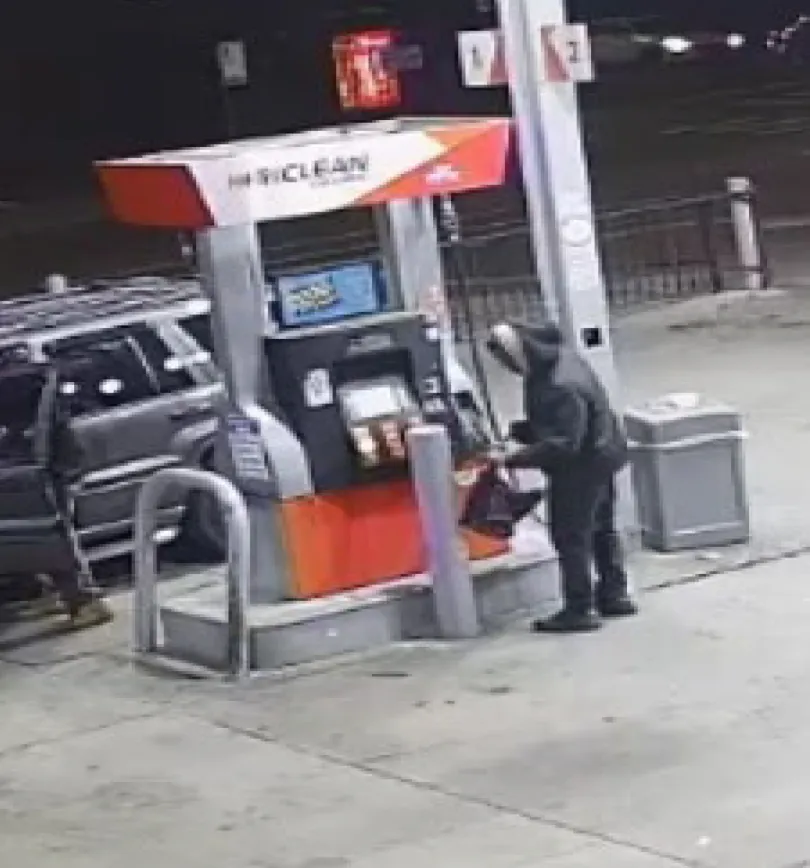
Reed pictured by closed-circuit television at a gas station before the attack

The suspect was identified as 50-year-old Lawrence Reed, a resident from Chicago. Reed had been arrested by Chicago police at least 72 times over the past 32 years, has 15 criminal convictions (including eight felony convictions), and has a history of mental illness. As described by the Chicago Tribune, Reed "was arrested while on pretrial release for an aggravated battery case and has several prior cases in his criminal history, including a 2020 conviction for aggravated arson for an attempt to set the Thompson Center on fire." In the latter case, ABC News reported that Reed "was sentenced to mental health probation". In December 2025, Reed was indicted on several additional charges, including attacking two CTA passengers in March 2025 and an arson incident targeting the City Hall-County Building on November 14, three days prior to the attack on MaGee.

A man resembling Reed was spotted on security camera filling a small container with gasoline from a convenience store pump and heading to a nearby Blue Line station less than thirty minutes before the attack. Reed was arrested on Tuesday morning, allegedly wearing the same clothes as the attacker, and with "fire related injuries to his right hand," according to a criminal complaint. The complaint further alleges that while in police custody, Reed "made repeated spontaneous and unprompted utterances, specifically yelling 'burn bitch' and 'burn alive bitch'". Reed was charged federally with terrorism against a mass transportation system, and also faces separate charges related to the attack on MaGee. The terrorism charge is punishable by a maximum sentence of life in federal prison and if the victim dies, Reed could be eligible for the death penalty. The federal terrorism charge was called "unusual" by the Chicago Tribune, with ABC News noting that it "has never been applied in Chicago".

== Reaction ==
The immolation led to renewed scrutiny of Illinois's SAFE-T Act, particularly the provisions relating to pre-trial detention, after it was revealed that Reed allegedly attacked MaGee while on pre-trial release with electronic monitoring to face charges of aggravated battery against a hospital worker, and that Reed had repeatedly violated the terms of his release in the days leading up to the attack. For example, the office of Eileen O'Neill Burke, the Cook County State's Attorney, cited the incident as a "tragic example" of "the overreliance on and inadequacies of electronic monitoring for violent offenders." Burke's office separately noted: "My office requested the perpetrator be detained after he committed a previous violent crime. The judge denied our request." The editorial board of the Chicago Tribune opined: "We believe the public at large is generally unaware that there's now effectively no timely enforcement for those who violate or ignore conditions of release under the [electronic monitoring] program. Given that [electronic monitoring] has become the main alternative to incarceration under the SAFE-T Act when judges opt not to detain those accused of serious crimes, the currently lax state of [electronic monitoring] enforcement obviously is a serious threat to public safety." Referring to an August statement by Circuit Court Judge Teresa Molina-Gonzalez ordering Reed's release with monitoring, the editorial board further commented that "[t]hose are likely to be words Molina-Gonzalez very much regrets when she next faces voters."

Chicago mayor Brandon Johnson stated: "[A]s awful and as horrific as this tragedy is, this is an isolated incident. As we continue to invest more in our public transportation system, we want people to feel safe as they ride." Johnson later described the case as "an absolute failure of our criminal justice, as well as our mental health institutions." In response to the criticism of the SAFE-T Act, Illinois Governor JB Pritzker emphasized that the law "is designed to give judges the ability to keep people in jail who they think are potentially dangerous to the community."

US president Donald Trump commented on the incident, blaming "liberal judges": "They burned this beautiful woman riding in a train. A man was arrested 72 times ... and they let him out again." As noted by Caroline Kubzansky and Talia Soglin of the Chicago Tribune, "Trump's administration has repeatedly used violence on public transit as a political cudgel against blue cities. That includes Chicago, where the administration previously threatened to withhold federal funds from the CTA if it did not address crime and fare evasion to its satisfaction." Transportation Secretary Sean Duffy wrote on X: "This horrific attack is EXACTLY why we need communities to take safety seriously. Blue cities cannot allow another Iryna Zarutska to happen."

== See also ==
- 2025 Cambridgeshire train stabbing – Multiple stabbing in the United Kingdom
- Killing of Debrina Kawam – Fatal immolation in Brooklyn, New York
- Killing of Iryna Zarutska – 2025 stabbing in Charlotte, North Carolina, U.S.
