= Joanne Hadjia =

Australian singer (born 1990)

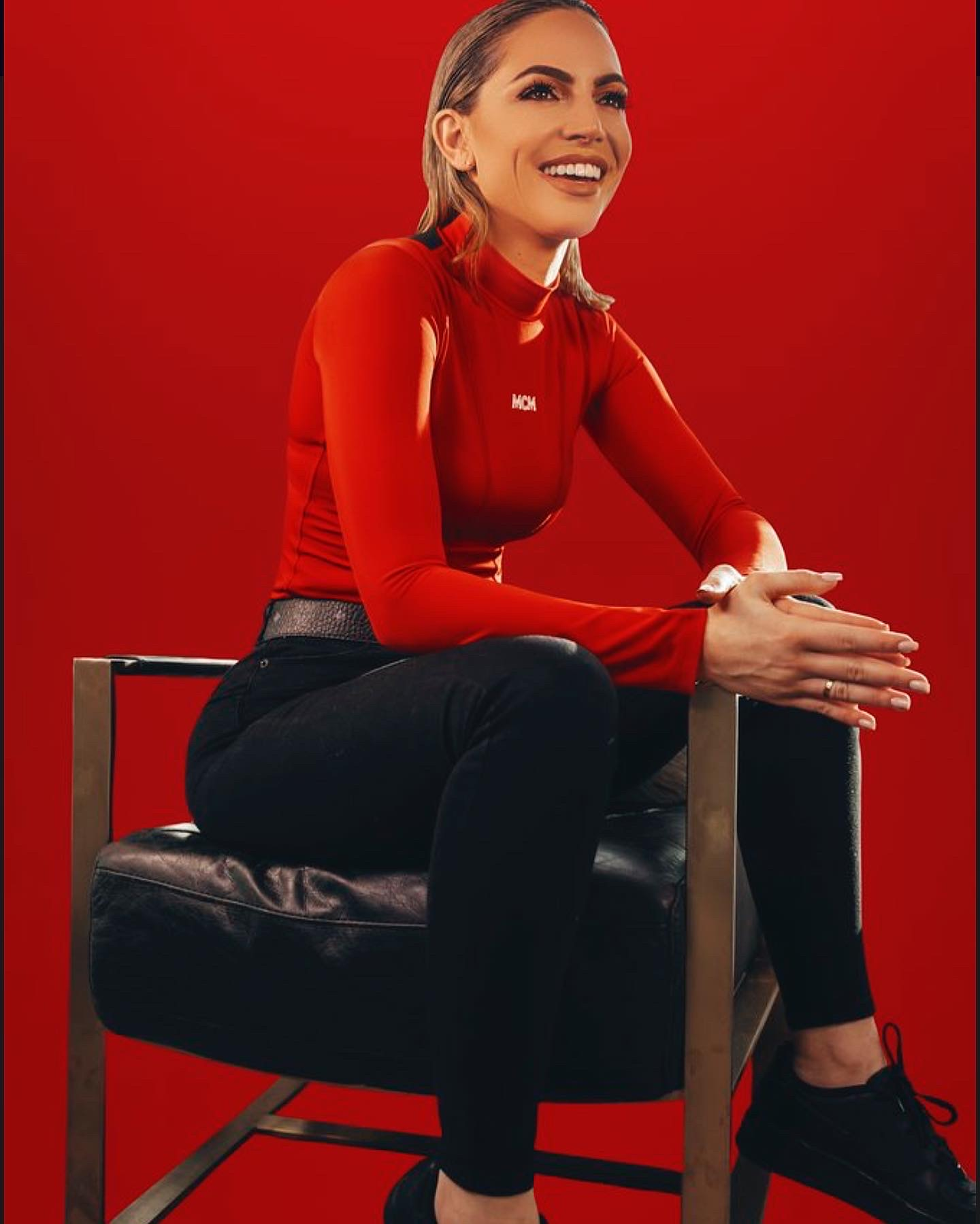
- Hadjia in 2019

Background information
- Born: Joanne Mary Hadjia; 7 November 1990 (age 36); Sydney
- Genres: R&B; soul; pop
- Occupations: Singer; songwriter
- Years active: 2009–present
- Label: Djia Media
- Website: djiamedia.com

Joanne Hadjia (born 7 November 1990 in Sydney), known professionally as Joey Djia (formerly known as Joelle until 2016, NOWIMJOEY until 2017, JOEY until 2018), is an Australian singer. She is first known as a contestant in the fourth season of The X Factor Australia, where she performed as part of the duo Good Question, and later in the show's fifth season as a solo act.

Alongside her music career, she has ventured into business, owning a recording studio chain, media company, running a baby clothing brand and a vending machine business with her husband.

== Personal life ==
Joanne Hadjia, also known as Joey Djia, is from Sydney, Australia. She married Omar Kadir in 2021 and has two sets of fraternal twins born November 2022 and July 2024. She owns various businesses including RecordBook; a 5 recording studio chain in North Hollywood, California, Djia Media, Inc.; a media and marketing company, Imonlylittle; an online brand as well as other businesses such as an Sydney wide vending machine business with her husband. She attended the University of Western Sydney.

== Career ==
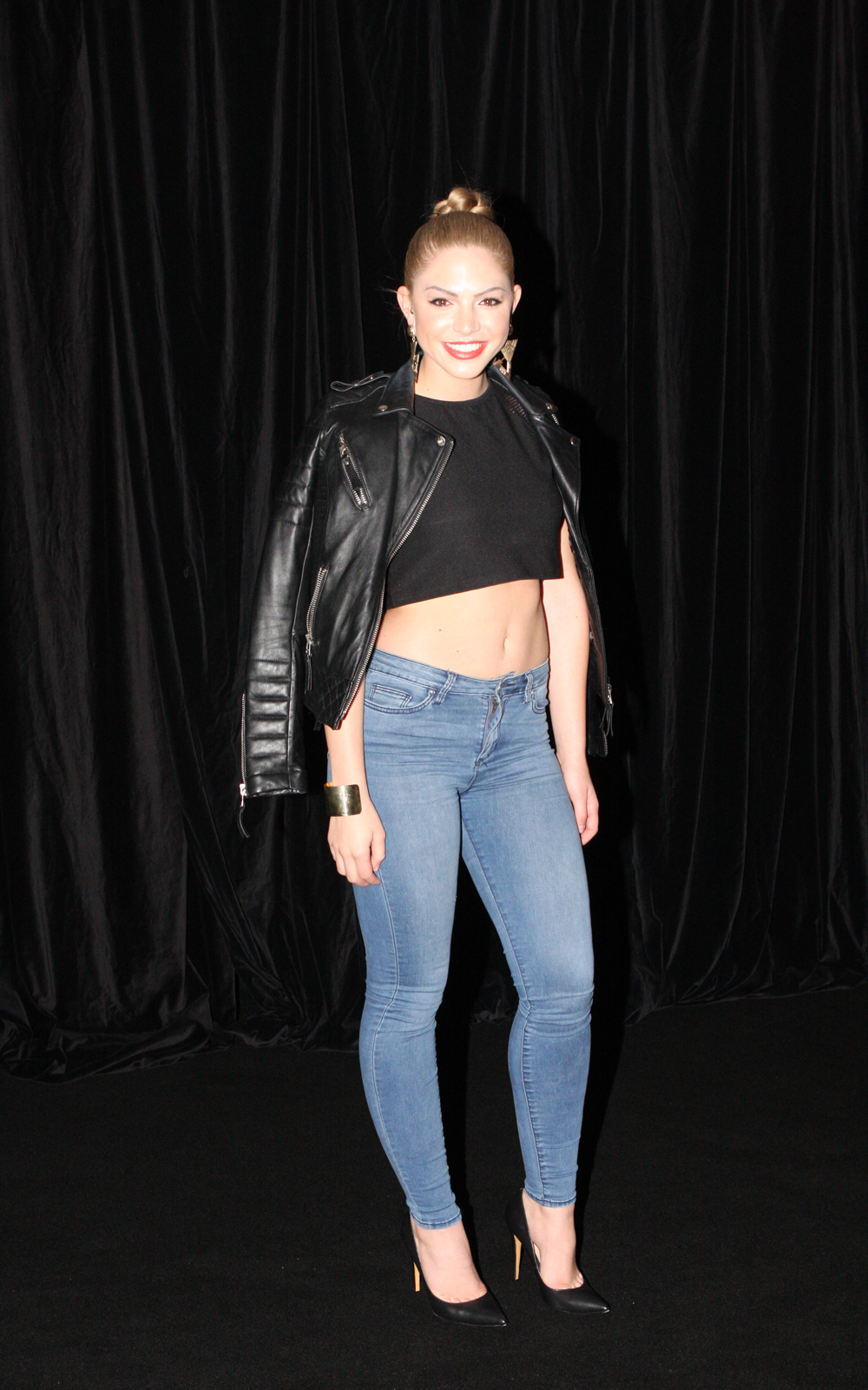
Hadjia in 2014

Hadjia originally tried to kickstart her career in Los Angeles when she was 19 and was signed to a small independent label. Hadjia released her first single entitled "Thought It Was You" which was produced by Sergio 'Don Dolla' Selim. Following the disbandment of Good Question, Hadjia announced that she would return to her solo career.

=== 2012–2013: The X Factor Australia ===
After Kristina Adesuwa discovered Hadjia on YouTube, they formed a duo called Good Question. The duo auditioned for the fourth season of The X Factor Australia, singing "Wild Ones" by American rapper Flo Rida and Sia, where they got four yeses. On the first day of super bootcamp, they performed "Back for Good" by the British pop group Take That. On 25 August 2012, Good Question performed "Get Yourself Back Home" by Gym Class Heroes on the talk show Weekend Sunrise.

Hadjia auditioned for the fifth season of The X Factor Australia as an individual contestant for the Girls category, in her home town of Sydney, singing "Don't You Worry Child" by Swedish House Mafia. She gained two out of three yeses with judge Redfoo feeling the she didn't have "The X Factor", despite this she advanced to the super bootcamp stage of the competition. On the first day of super bootcamp, Hadjia sang a rendition of "I'm with You" by Avril Lavigne, advancing to the second stage of bootcamp. On the second day, she sang "ET" by Katy Perry. On the final day of bootcamp, Hadjia performed "Big Girls Don't Cry" by Fergie to the judges and a live audience of one thousand, advancing to the home visits. Hadjia was announced to compete in the Girls category being mentored by Redfoo. At the home visits, Hadjia sang "Read All About It, Pt. III" by Emeli Sande for Redfoo and his assistant will.i.am. Hadjia advanced to the live shows stage. At the first week of the live shows, Redfoo chose Hadjia to sing "Sweet Nothing" by Calvin Harris, and she advanced to the second week of the live shows.

In week four of the live shows, she sang "True Love" by Pink causing judge Ronan Keating to say "Every week, every single week we're in the same situation. This isn't you, this isn't the right song" and also leaving him to question Redfoo by saying "I don't know if you guys are not working together but I'm just not getting it. It's not happening." In week five of the live shows, Hadjia fell into the bottom two alongside Jiordan Tolli but was sent home after Keating, Natalie Bassingthwaighte and Dannii Minogue all chose to save Tolli. Hadjia's version of "Joey" debuted on the ARIA Singles Chart at number 33, but fell to number 81 the following week.

==== Performances on The X Factor ====
denotes having entered the ARIA Singles Chart.
denotes having been in the bottom two.
denotes having been eliminated.

Show	Theme	Song	Original artist	Order	Result
Audition	Free choice	"Don't You Worry Child"	Swedish House Mafia	N/A	Through to super bootcamp
Super bootcamp 1	Solo performance	"I'm with You"	Avril Lavigne	N/A	Through to super bootcamp 2
Super bootcamp 2	Group performance	"ET"	Katy Perry	N/A	Through to super bootcamp 3
Super bootcamp 3	Solo performance	"Big Girls Don't Cry"	Fergie	N/A	Through to home visits
Home visits	Free choice	"Read All About It, Pt. III"	Emeli Sande	N/A	Through to live shows
Week 1	Judges' Choice	"Sweet Nothing"	Calvin Harris	11	Safe
Week 2	Legends	"Rude Boy"	Rihanna	2	Bottom two
Week 2	Final Showdown	"Give Me Love"	Ed Sheeran	2	Saved
Week 3	Top 10 Hits	"Locked Out of Heaven"	Bruno Mars	7	Safe
Week 4	Latest and Greatest	"True Love"	Pink	4	Safe
Week 5	Rock	"Joey"	Concrete Blonde	3	Bottom two
Week 5	Final Showdown	"A Thousand Miles"	Vanessa Carlton	1	Eliminated (8th place)

=== 2014: After The X Factor ===
Hadjia's debut single "Save Me" was released on 15 April 2014, and debuted at number 56 on the ARIA Singles Chart. In September 2014, Hadjia released a song called "So Don't" which was written by Hadjia and was recorded to raise awareness to suicide. Initially available only from her website, it was released on iTunes in March 2017. Hadjia's second single "Balance" was released on 19 November 2014. Hadjia's third single "Wish I Never" was released on 19 May 2015.

=== 2012–2018: Gronkeh to Djia Media, Inc ===
In 2012, Joey decided to sign herself to a company of her own with the knowledge she gained being in the industry. Joey launched an independent label; Gronkeh, Inc. Gaining millions of listeners throughout the years, Joey decided to rebrand the company and to help other artists in the process. Djia Media, Inc. was developed from Joey's hard work and dedication. Being the CEO of her own career, Joey now helps usher a new generation of talent, signing new and also established acts. As of September 2019, Joey published her first book; "Decompress: A 7 Day Guide To Reduce Stress, Anxiety and Depression " which became an international best seller in both Australia and America.

== Artistry ==
To people from the show, I might seem like some blonde chick who just went on there to be a singer but there's way more to it and how I ended up with this chance, because of everything I've been through, I'm taking every opportunity and I'm determined to make this work. The one thing I always come back to is my music. I'm really full on so music helps me express that and is a great release. I love music because I can put a sound to whatever I am feeling at a particular time.

— Joelle, on her music

Hadjia describes her voice as "a combination of RnB, pop and soul." Joelle also said "I don't really have a particular genre that I put myself in which I always thought was a bad thing but now I'm discovering it is good because it is something different and fresh". She cites Beyoncé, Drake, Rihanna, The Weeknd, Chris Brown, Lauryn Hill, Keri Hilson, Jessie J, John Legend, Rita Ora, Kelly Rowland, Ed Sheeran and Taylor Swift as her musical influences.

== Discography ==
=== Studio albums ===
Title	Album details	Peak chart positions
Title	Album details	AUS
Enough	Release date: 11 August 2017; Label: Gronkeville; Formats: digital download,	

=== Singles ===
Title	Year	Peak chart positions	
Title	Year	AUS	AUS Indie
"Save Me"	2014	56	5
"Balance"	2014	—	9
"Wish I Never"	2015	85	5
"So Don't"	2016	—	—
"I'm Done"	2016	—	—
"He Said"	2016	—	—
"Miracle"	2016	—	—
"Feel Something"	2016	—	—
"Best Friend"	2017	—	—
"Temporary Love"	2017	—	—
"Fuel"	2017	—	—
"—" denotes a song that did not enter that chart.

=== Other charted songs ===
Title	Year	Peak chart positions
Title	Year	AUS
"Joey"	2013	33
