= Rette mich =

Rette mich (German for rescue me) may refer to:

- "Rette mich" (Tokio Hotel song), 2005
- "Rette mich", a song by Eisbrecher from Die Hölle muss warten, 2012
- "Rette mich", a song by Nena from ?, 1984
- "Rette mich", a song by Oomph! from Ego, 2001

== See also ==
- Rescue Me (disambiguation)
- Save Me (disambiguation)
