= Operation Plato =

British omnibus governmental protocol

Operation Plato is a British omnibus governmental protocol enacted in the event of major national or regional emergencies requiring the immediate coordination of multiple first responders and national governmental echelons; most notably Cabinet Office Briefing Rooms (more familiarly known as Cobra) is convened. The Joint Operating Principles (JOP) automatically come into play. Operation Plato is used by police when responding to a "marauding terror attack".

== Incidents ==
- It was activated during the Manchester Arena bombing but force duty officer (FDO) Insp Dale Sexton went against guidance and kept Operation Plato "secret" so that paramedics, unarmed police and members of the public helping the injured would not be withdrawn from a "hot zone", in which only armed officers should operate.
- It was activated (by the Greater Manchester Police) for the 2 October 2025 Manchester synagogue attack on Yom Kippur
- It was initially activated but later rescinded in response to the 2025 Cambridgeshire train stabbing on 1 November 2025.
