= 2025 Cambridgeshire train stabbing =

Multiple stabbing in the United Kingdom

- Location: LNER train between Peterborough and Huntingdon
- Date: 1 November 2025; 19:39 (GMT)
- Attack type: Mass stabbing
- Weapon: Knife
- Deaths: 0
- Injuries: 11 (2 critically)
- Accused: Anthony Williams
- Charges: Attempted murder (11 counts); Actual bodily harm (1 count); Possession of a bladed article (1 count)

On 1 November 2025, a mass stabbing occurred aboard a London North Eastern Railway (LNER) train in England that had departed from Doncaster and was heading for London King's Cross. A man boarded the train at Peterborough railway station in Cambridgeshire at approximately 19:30 GMT, then began attacking passengers indiscriminately.

Within fourteen minutes of the train leaving Peterborough and within five minutes of the first call to emergency services, the train made an unscheduled stop at Huntingdon railway station. It was met at 19:44 by armed police who arrested two men, one of whom was released the following day without charge. Ten people were taken to hospital, nine of whom were believed to have life-threatening injuries.

The next day, the police ruled out a terrorist motive and said that the attacker had acted alone. He was charged with eleven counts of attempted murder, one of which related to an incident at a London station on the morning of the same day.

== Incident ==
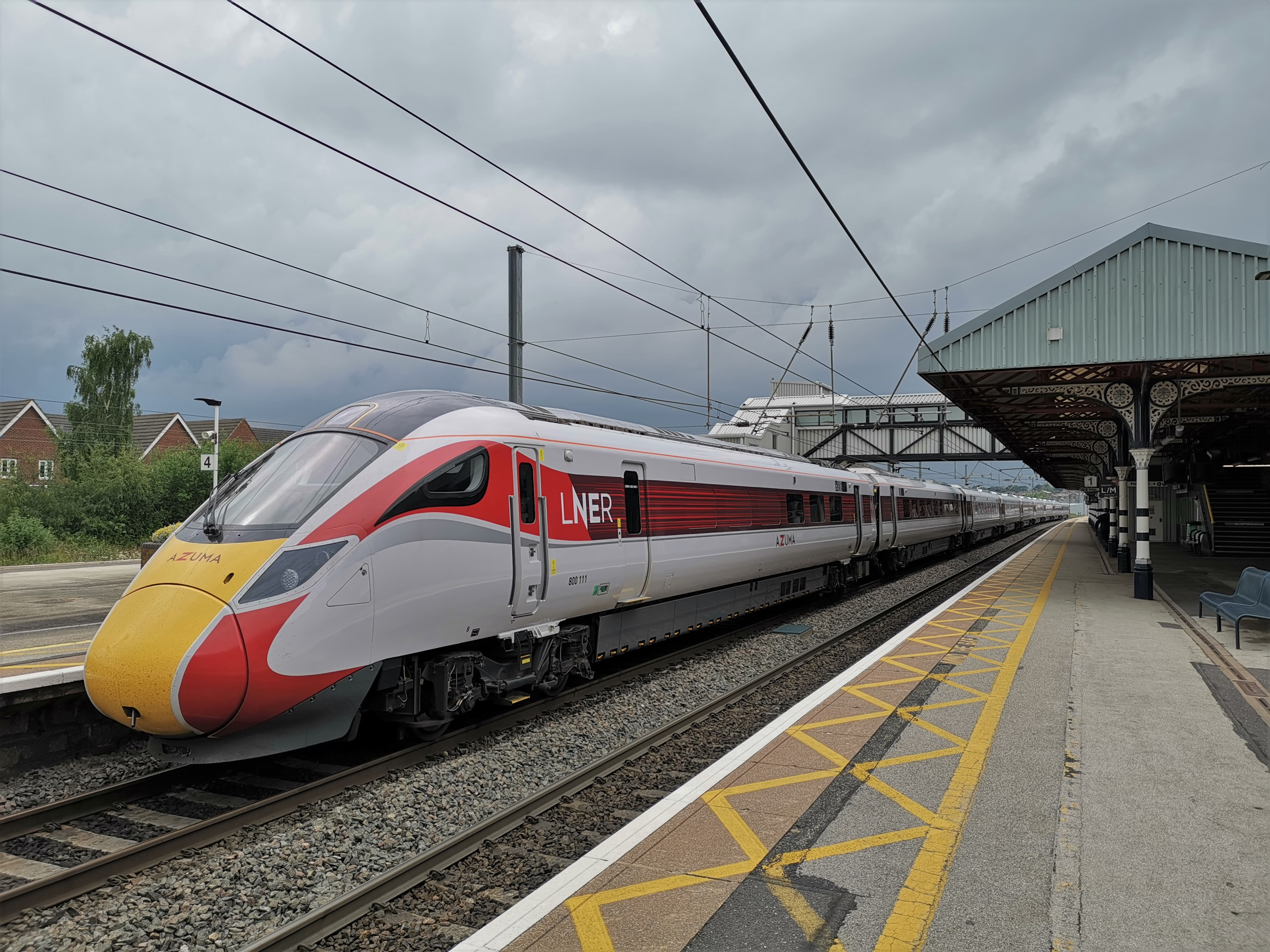
The train involved, unit 800111, at Grantham in 2019

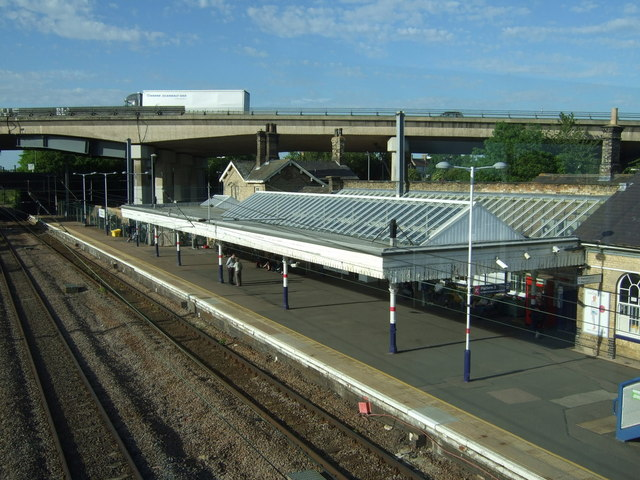
The platform at Huntingdon railway station at which the train stopped, photographed in 2015

The attacker boarded the train at Peterborough railway station, and the stabbings began shortly after the train left the station at 19:30 GMT. At 19:39, Cambridgeshire Constabulary, whose headquarters are close to Huntingdon railway station, received the first 999 call from a passenger on board the train, with the British Transport Police being alerted at 19:42. The police declared the situation to be a major incident, using the code word "Operation Plato", which is designed for use in "marauding terror attacks". This was rescinded when it became clear that the incident was not terror-related. As the attack was ongoing, the driver communicated with his control room and Network Rail signallers who diverted the train to the slow line, enabling it to stop at the next available station. The train made an unscheduled stop at Huntingdon railway station at 19:44. The police estimate that the entire incident lasted 10–15 minutes between the beginning of the stabbings and officers accessing the train at Huntingdon.

According to eyewitnesses, the attacker was armed with a knife and indiscriminately assaulted passengers on board, causing panic and injuries; several witnesses reported seeing people fleeing through the aisle covered in blood, and one victim collapsing. Eyewitnesses said that the attack began in coach J, the fourth carriage from the front of the nine-car train, and that an emergency alarm in that carriage was pulled. According to one witness, the attacker said that the "devil is not going to win". Multiple passengers locked themselves into the buffet car (two coaches further back), which the assailant tried but failed to enter.

Ten people were taken to Addenbrooke's Hospital, a major trauma centre in Cambridge, for treatment, and another person later self-presented with injuries. Nine of the injured were believed to have had life-threatening injuries. Five of the injured had been discharged by the evening of 2 November. Two people were arrested on suspicion of attempted murder within eight minutes of the first 999 call being made. Thirty officers from Cambridgeshire Constabulary attended the incident alongside officers from British Transport Police. Huntingdon station was closed to the public, all trains in the surrounding area were brought to a halt, and armed officers were deployed to the scene. A witness said a man holding a large knife was tased and restrained by police. A witness told The Guardian that the man shouted "kill me" three times to officers prior to his arrest.

A passenger and an LNER employee, both of whom were wounded, were praised for their attempts to stop the attacker and protect passengers. Stephen Crean, a passenger, received injuries to his hand when trying to disarm the attacker. Samir Zitouni, a member of the catering crew on the train, was injured in the head and neck and spent two weeks in hospital.

=== Investigation ===
A diagram of the train involved

Police were initially joined by Counter Terrorism Policing in their investigation, although terrorism was soon dismissed as a motive for the attack. British Transport Police were later announced as leading the investigation. Police initially identified two men as suspects, but on 2 November they announced that one had been released without charge.

On 3 November, police announced that the attacker had been linked to an incident earlier on 1 November, in which someone was attacked at Pontoon Dock DLR station in London. The following day, police said he was also being linked to three incidents in Peterborough on 31 October and 1 November. In one incident, a 14-year-old suffered minor injuries when he was stabbed in the city centre; in the other incidents, a barber's shop reported a man with a knife. On 6 November, police said there was a further link to an incident in Fletton in September, in which a man was attacked with a knife while waiting for a taxi outside a social club in Fletton and left with a cut to his face that required stitches. A few days later, Cambridgeshire Police referred itself to the Independent Office for Police Conduct (IOPC) over its handling of the Fletton incident. The IOPC reported in July 2026, concluding that two police constables should face charges of gross misconduct for falsely claiming CCTV was not available and, in the case of one of the constables, failing to conduct proper inquiries into the incident.

== Suspect ==
The suspect was identified as 32-year-old Anthony Williams, a black British national from Peterborough. Police stated that he is believed to have acted alone, with no links to terrorism or organised crime. On 3 November, police announced that he had been charged with eleven counts of attempted murder, one count of actual bodily harm for an assault on a police officer while in custody, and one count of possession of a bladed article.

Following an appearance at Peterborough Magistrates Court, Williams was remanded in custody. He declined to enter a plea. One of the counts of attempted murder, plus an additional account of possession of a bladed article, relate to an incident at Pontoon Dock DLR station on the day of the train attack. On 19 November, police confirmed that Williams had been charged with seven additional offences, including two more counts of attempted murder. These new charges stem from incidents that occurred on 31 October in Peterborough, Stevenage, and aboard a train travelling between Hitchin and Biggleswade. On 1 December, Williams failed to appear in Cambridge Crown Court after refusing to join a video link from prison. The short hearing was adjourned with proceedings due to resume on 28 January.

On 9 July 2026, during a plea hearing at Cambridge Crown Court, Williams denied all twenty-one charges against him, the charges being: fourteen attempted murders charges, ten attempted murder charges on the train near Huntingdon on 1 November 2025, three attempted murder charges in Peterborough the day before, including that of a 14-year-old boy, and another attempted murder charge of a 17-year-old boy in East London in the early-hours of 1 November, as well as three charges of possessing a bladed article, one charge of assaulting a police officer, and one charge of common assault on another train. The trial was originally scheduled for June 2026, but was delayed until October.

The pre-trial review took place on 19 October. The accused pleaded not guilty to seventeen charges of attempted murder and guilty to fourteen charges of wounding with intent, one charge of affray, one charge of theft and two charges of possessing a bladed article in public. A three-week trial opened on 26 October.

== Reactions ==
Shortly after the attack, Home Secretary Shabana Mahmood urged people to avoid comment and speculation before facts were released by the police. She also said the police had increased their presence on the rail network. Kemi Badenoch, the leader of the opposition, also asked people to wait until more facts emerge, but added that "we cannot be a country where people are innocently going about their business and facing this level of violent crime".

There was debate around the decision by the police to release information about the ethnicity and nationality of those arrested and charged, done following half a day of online speculation and far-right rumours about African immigrants or Muslims being responsible. Three month earlier, the National Police Chiefs' Council changed guidance to allow police to give that information after charging suspects, but several MPs on the right argued it was done too slowly. The Conservative MP for Huntingdon, Ben Obese-Jecty, urged the police to reveal more about the attackers, arguing that releasing their identities was important to stop misinformation and speculation from being spread. The decision was welcomed by Jonathan Hall KC, the Independent Reviewer of Terrorism Legislation.

Shadow Home Secretary Chris Philp initially said the police and government should provide an update on what happened and who has been arrested as soon as possible. He later added that the attack showed the UK's need for an increase in stop and search.

Evangelos Marinakis, the owner of Nottingham Forest F.C., offered to fund medical care for any supporters affected by the attacks; many of the club's London-based fans were aboard the train returning from the home fixture against Manchester United.

== See also ==
- 2025 Hamburg stabbing attack, on a station platform
- List of mass stabbings in the United Kingdom
- 2025 Chicago train attack
- Killing of Iryna Zarutska
