= Save You =

Save You may refer to:

- "Save You" (Kelly Clarkson song) (2009)
- "Save You" (Pearl Jam song) (2002)
- "Save You" (Simple Plan song) (2008)
- "Save You", a 2006 song by A. R. Rahman from Provoked
- "Save You", a song by Emilie Autumn from Enchant
- "Save You!", a song by Galneryus from Resurrection
- "Save You", a song by Matthew Perryman Jones from Music from One Tree Hill
- "Save You", a song by The Riverboat Gamblers from Something to Crow About
- "Save You", a song by Seasons After from Through Tomorrow
- "Save You", a song by The Sound of Arrows from the South Korean edition of Magic EP
- "Save You", a song by Veruca Salt from IV

== See also ==
- Save (disambiguation)
- Save Me (disambiguation)
- Save You/Save Me, a 2007 album by Nothing More
