= 2025 Hamburg stabbing attack =

Mass stabbing in Hamburg, Germany

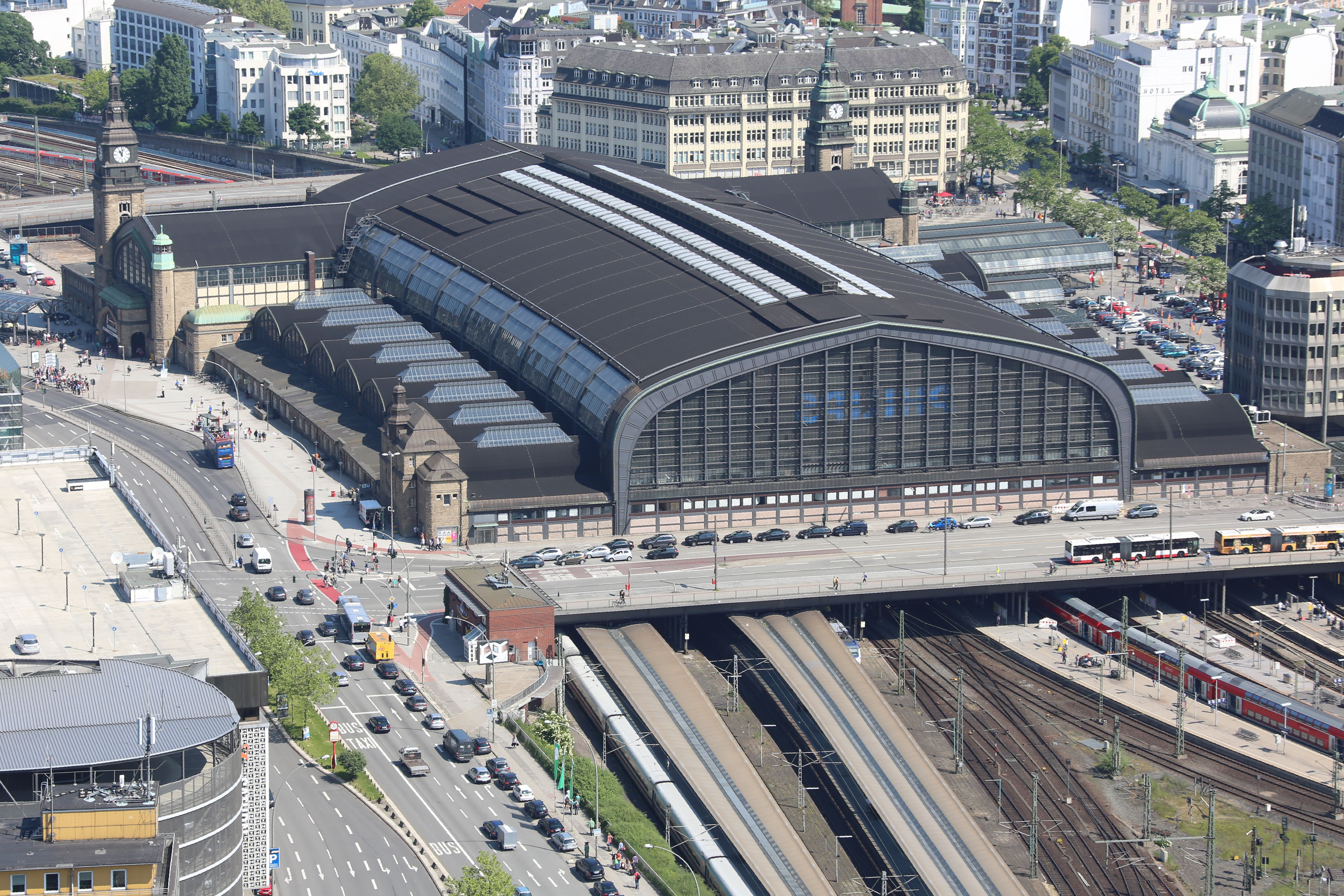
- Hamburg Hauptbahnhof in 2013
- Location: 53°33′10″N 10°00′23″E; Altstadt, Hamburg, Germany
- Date: 23 May 2025; 18:05 (CEST)
- Attack type: Mass stabbing
- Weapon: Vegetable knife
- Deaths: 0
- Injuries: 18 (3 indirectly)
- Perpetrator: Lydia S.
- Charges: 21 counts of attempted manslaughter, including fifteen coinciding with dangerous bodily harm
- Verdict: Not criminally responsible

On 23 May 2025, a mass stabbing took place at the central train station of Hamburg, Germany. Eighteen people were wounded. Passersby subdued the perpetrator, 39-year-old Lydia S., until the arrival of Hamburg Police. Police ruled out political or terrorist motives, and due to the perpetrator's history, they have strong reasons to believe that she was affected by mental illness. In January 2026, Lydia S. was found not criminally responsible due to schizophrenia and placed in indefinite holding at a forensic psychiatric facility.

== Background ==
Hamburg Hauptbahnhof is the second-busiest train station in Europe, processing around half a million travellers each day. The attack occurred on a Friday evening, which are noted to be particularly crowded, more so than usual due to the beginning of Pentecost holiday season in Hamburg.

The train station is considered a hotspot for violent crime and drug use. A ban on weapons and alcohol had been put in place around the train station in October 2023 and April 2024 respectively to prevent fights. As part of increased police activity, over 500 weapons, including 350 knives, were confiscated during person searches in 2024. Over 200 cameras were installed inside the station. Since spring 2023, the train station has been regularly patrolled by Quattro-Streifen (Quattro patrols), a formation of four officers from Federal Police, State Police, Deutsche Bahn security and Hochbahn security. Between 2023 and 2024, annual incidents of violence at the train station fell from 720 to 546 cases, but crimes involving knives increased from 12 to 23.

== Incident ==
The attack occurred shortly after 6 p.m. at the platform for rail 13/14, located to the far west of the south jetty, outside of the main station hall. Most of the victims had been waiting for the departure of an Intercity Express bound for Fulda, originally scheduled for 6:01 p.m. Witnesses described a woman running through the crowd while shouting incoherently, appearing to push people around her while moving her arms in a "swimming motion". The knife had not been visible at first, with commuters dispersing once the stabbed victims began to scream and clutch at their wounds.

The attack was stopped when a member of the public tripped the woman with an outstretched leg. The bystander was joined by another man in restraining the perpetrator and two minutes later, armed officers of a Quattro-Streife arrived and took custody of the perpetrator. According to one of the helpers and police, the woman stopped screaming as soon as she was subdued and also offered no resistance upon her arrest. Media sources noted that the two men, 21-year-old Abu Bakr Siddik Agaev and 19-year-old Muhammad al-Muhammad, were of Chechen and Syrian nationality. The knife was kicked out of the perpetrator's hand by one of the men and recovered from the rail track. The attack lasted 24 seconds.

Despite the initial panic, other platforms remained in order, with trains arriving and departing as usual. First aid was immediately provided by witnesses on the platforms and a train that arrived shortly after the attack. Around 410 police officers and 50 fire fighters responded to the scene. The streets between Hühnerposten and Steintor were temporarily closed off. Train services were resumed by 7 p.m., with the exception of the rails 11 to 14, surrounding the affected platform. Significant delays in train traffic resulted from the attack and subsequent police deployment, with most lines redirected to depart or terminate at Hamburg-Harburg station instead.

== Victims ==
Responding fire department initially counted eight injured victims, which were revised to twelve within the hour. At least one person had been stabbed in the neck. Paramedics treated victims on-site at Steintordamm, near the train station. Emergency services were still in the process of combing the area for any unaccounted wounded people.

By 10 p.m., the fire department reported between 17 and 18 injuries. Police declined to give an official number in the hours after the stabbing, At a press conference the next morning, police confirmed a total count of 18 injured, aged 19 to 85, including three injuries from falls and shock. Additionally, six people who were attacked evaded the knife swings. Four people had life-threatening injuries and another six had heavy injuries. By the following day, all victims were in stable condition, and as of 27 May, all but two were released from stationary hospital treatment. Seven individuals were locals to Hamburg while the others were from Bremen, Lower Saxony, North Rhine-Westphalia, Bavaria, and Hesse, also including two citizens of Poland and Jordan.

== Perpetrator ==
Lydia S., a 39-year-old German woman from Braunschweig, was arrested by police. Witnesses stated that the woman had stabbed people indiscriminately. Evaluation of surveillance footage preceding the stabbing led police to believe that she acted alone. She had stolen the knife, with a blade length of 8,5 cm, from a pharmacy in the station's commercial area at 17:52, around ten minutes before the attack.

According to police spokesperson Florian Abbenseth, there is no evidence pointing towards a political or extremist motive. Investigators had "strong indication" for mental illness and that the perpetrator had been in "mental distress" at the time of the crime. There were no signs of intoxication on alcohol or drugs.

According to the news magazine Der Spiegel, Lydia S. had a prior criminal record, dating back to 2021, which included assault and arson. On 5 March 2024, while riding a train to Bremen, she was arrested for attacking fellow passengers, with officers finding a hatchet in her backpack. Between November and December 2024, she spent several weeks at two psychiatric clinics for suicide threats. On 5 January 2025, she stabbed her parents with scissors during an argument in Großhansdorf, leaving her father with heavy injuries. Landesgericht Lübeck denied a request by the prosecutor's office to have Lydia S. put in a psychiatric ward. On 26 February of the same year, Lydia S. punched a six-year-old girl at the food court in Hamburg Airport, resulting in her being involuntarily committed to Ochsenzoll clinic in Langenhorn. During her stay, she assaulted a fellow patient in March, for which she was being criminally investigated. She was released from Ochsenzoll, but recommitted in early May after police found her in a "helpless state" in Cuxhaven. After receiving treatment at a closed psychiatric ward in Geestland, reported as either four days or three weeks, she was released a day before the attack. She was previously diagnosed with paranoid schizophrenia and was described as "part of the homeless community". While psychiatric treatment ranged back to 2005, she was never committed for longer than a few weeks. Lydia S.'s lawyer maintained that requests for longer stationary treatments were repeatedly denied.

Several hours before the attack, Lydia S. had been stopped and checked by police at Hamburg Airport, when a paramedic noticed a bleeding injury on her face and called over officers because she appeared confused. S. did not have any identification on her, but claimed she was planning to fly to Paris. She told police of her recent release from a mental hospital and that the injury was inflicted by a staff member there, but she declined an offer to accompany officers to file charges.

== Investigation ==
The Federal Police of Germany temporarily closed off the southwestern part of the train station to the public for forensic investigation. The railways were fully reopened after 1:15 a.m. The sequence of events was filmed by a surveillance camera and further detailed by questioning of witnesses. A background check into Lydia S.'s prior psychiatric history was issued.

A magistrate judge has charged Lydia S. with 15 counts of attempted manslaughter in coincidence with dangerous bodily harm. She was set to be held at the Ochsenzoll facility while in custody. According to the Hamburg Public Prosecutor General's Office, S. confessed to her actions in front of the investigating judge.

=== Trial ===
On 16 October 2025, the public prosecutor's office ordered securing procedures to arrange indefinite involuntary confinement for Lydia S., as the prosecutor's office deemed her most likely not criminally responsible on account of a "distorted reality perception in conjunction with paranoid schizophrenia". The prosecution stated that Lydia S. had committed the stabbing to "silence the voices". On 18 November, legal proceedings for the securing order began at a penal section of Landgericht Hamburg. Six co-plaintiffs are represented in the trial, including the defendant's father. On 27 January 2026, after seven court dates, Lydia S. was found not criminally responsible due to a mental disorder and put in involuntary commitment.

== Reactions ==
=== Political ===
German Chancellor Friedrich Merz called Hamburg's First Mayor Peter Tschentscher to receive updates on the unfolding situation and the status of the injured. Merz called the attack "upsetting" and sent well wishes to the victims and their families. Federal Minister of the Interior Alexander Dobrindt called the attack "treacherous and cowardly". Merz, Tschentscher, and Dobrindt thanked the first responders for their life-saving efforts.

Konstantin von Notz, Bundestag MP for Alliance 90/The Greens, called for permanent posting of Federal Police at train stations and airports as a security measure. Sören Pellmann, Leader of The Left in the Bundestag, advocated for increased spending in mental health care.

=== Misinformation ===
Several conspiracy theories circulated on social media shortly after the attack. An early report by Welt, in which a witness had described the arrested suspect as a "young man in a hoodie", was widely shared to claim that authorities were lying about the suspect being female. Users on Twitter and Facebook additionally claimed that the suspect was a "turbo-Germanised Palestinian woman" or a "trans woman from Palestine", who immigrated in 2016.

After the identification of Muhammad al-Muhammad as one of the men who restrained the perpetrator through an article by Der Spiegel, social media users spread misinformation to either cast doubt on al-Muhammad's involvement or deny his existence as an invention of the press all together. Within hours of the report, internet users claimed that al-Muhammad was not in Hamburg during the stabbing because the private photo used by Der Spiegel, taken two months earlier, showed him at the Brandenburg Gate in Berlin. Exxtra24, a news portal owned by Markus Posset and run by former Exxpress chief editor Richard Schmitt, called into question why al-Muhammad was not directly named in police reports. Deutsche Welle made contact with Hamburg Police, which confirmed that al-Muhammad was one of the helpers and stated that any persons involved in a criminal case are not named in press reports due to personality rights. There was also a Bild article claiming that police were the ones to subdue the attacker, citing a police report which stated "Emergency services and police temporarily put the suspect under arrest". In a response to an inquiry by public broadcaster Norddeutscher Rundfunk (NDR), Bild defended the phrasing of the article, writing "How do you imagine the arrest of a woman running amok and stabbing at her surroundings? It's always a subduing regardless of force applied by police".

AI-generated images were spread to falsely claim that al-Muhammad did not exist or his role in stopping the attacker was a fabrication. According to NDR, the fake images of al-Muhammad, which first appeared on Twitter, were purposely made to be recognisable as AI-generated, then falsely attributed as having been used by mainstream media to discredit the story. According to media studies researcher Una Titz, the misinformation campaign was a response to "overtly positive reporting" on al-Muhammad, stating "The idea that a Syrian can be a rescuer doesn't fit into a world view that considers refugees, particularly Syrians, synonymous with 'knifemen', or assassins".

=== Judicial ===
Andreas Roßkopf, head of the Federal Police representation in the Gewerkschaft der Polizei (GdP) police union, has called for the government to make AI-based surveillance technology with movement recognition available for Federal Police officers at German train stations, in order to "detect behavioral abnormalities in advance". The union renewed existing calls for the implementation of a weapons-free zone at all train stations, which would allow officers to search individuals for weapons regardless of suspicion.

Following the reveal of the existing psychiatric record of Lydia S., GdP complained about the inability of officers to hold persons with known mental issues for involuntary commitment, which is only allowed in cases where individuals pose an acute danger to themselves or others. There was further criticism regarding the discharge of Lydia S. a day before the stabbing, in spite of her history of violent incidents and an ongoing investigation against her; a court order is required to hold a person in involuntary commitment for longer periods of time.

As Lydia S. had been treated at a facility in Lower Saxony, the state's ministry of social affairs planned a reform of the PsychKG, the state mental health laws, to allow for more thorough examinations of patients due for release at mental hospitals. Law enforcement would also receive easier access to information about potential risk persons (Gefährder) with prior forced psychiatric stays. The law reform neared completion in September 2025 and originally set for introduction at the Landtag of Lower Saxony for December 2025. The Lower Saxon City and Communal Association voiced support for the reform, while CDU criticised that the changes weren't enough and that the law should be revised to include more data access for law enforcement. As of November 2025, the decision date was pushed to 2026. The state government agreed to the change on 20 January 2026 and seeks approval by the Landtag within the year. The reform was criticised as an increased stigmatization of mental illness by the patient advocacy group Bundesverband Psychiatrie-Erfahrener.

== See also ==
- 2015 Thalys train attack
- 2025 Cambridgeshire train stabbing
