= Somebody Save Me =

Somebody Save Me may refer to:

- "Somebody Save Me" (Cinderella song), 1987
- "Somebody Save Me" (Eminem song), 2024
- Somebody Save Me, a 2019 album by Sugaray Rayford
- "Somebody Save Me", a song by Krypteria from their 2007 album Bloodangel's Cry

== See also ==
- Save Me (disambiguation)
