= Killing of Debrina Kawam =

Fatal immolation in Brooklyn, New York

- Location of the Coney Island-Stillwell Avenue station relative to New York City
- Location: 40°34′38″N 73°58′52″W; Coney Island-Stillwell Avenue station, Brooklyn, New York City
- Date: December 22, 2024 c. 7:30 a.m. EST
- Attack type: Targeted immolation
- Weapon: Lighter
- Victim: Debrina Kawam
- Motive: Unknown
- Accused: Sebastian Zapeta-Calil
- Charges: First-degree murder (1 count); Second-degree murder (1 count); First-degree arson (1 count)

On the morning of December 22, 2024, Debrina Kawam (born Debbie Kawam), was immolated by a man while she was sleeping on the New York City Subway while an F train was stopped at the Coney Island-Stillwell Avenue station in Brooklyn. Sebastian Zapeta-Calil, was subsequently arrested in connection to the killing.

The immolation was determined to have been a random attack. The incident has led to heightened concerns relating to safety of those using transportation in New York City.

== Incident ==
At approximately 7:30 a.m. EST on December 22, 2024, on a stationary F train at the Coney Island-Stillwell Avenue station, a man approached the only other passenger on the train car, a woman who was sleeping, using a lighter to set fire to her clothing. The victim became engulfed in flames in a matter of seconds.

After carrying out the attack, the perpetrator got off the train car but remained at the scene sitting on a bench. A video taken by a bystander shows a man, later identified as Zapeta-Calil, sitting on a nearby bench watching the fire before standing up and appearing to fan the flames using a T-shirt.

Body cameras worn by two officers responding to the scene captured him on a bench opposite the car. A third officer was later discovered on video repeatedly walking by Kawam while she burned but making no attempt to smother the flames. Zapeta-Calil was not immediately identified as the suspected perpetrator, however, and was able to leave the scene. Images from the video were later circulated to identify him. A Metropolitan Transportation Authority worker used a fire extinguisher to put out the fire, but the victim was pronounced dead at the scene at 7:48 a.m.

== Victim ==
On December 31, 2024, nine days after the attack, police identified the victim, Debrina Kawam, a 57-year-old woman who had been reported as living in New York City homeless shelters since at least September 9, 2024, but who lived previously in Toms River, New Jersey. She attended Passaic Valley Regional High School in Little Falls, New Jersey graduating in 1985. In an autopsy carried out on the victim, a medical examiner determined that the victim's cause of death was heat-related burns as well as smoke inhalation.

Within a day of the attack, false stories circulated on social media using an invented name and AI-generated images. These posts were debunked immediately.

== Suspect ==
The primary suspect was identified as 33-year-old Guatemalan Sebastian Zapeta-Calil, who illegally immigrated to the United States after being extradited in 2018 as a result of attempting to enter through the Arizona-Mexico border. It is unknown how long Zapeta-Calil has been in the United States.

Zapeta-Calil was arrested at the Herald Square station shortly after the incident, when three high school students recognized him on another subway train and called 911. At the time of his arrest, he was found possessing a lighter.

He was formally charged with first-degree and second-degree murder with an additional arson charge. Zapeta-Calil was sent to a hospital overnight, which delayed his arraignment hearing. Authorities said that the suspect and the woman were unrelated and that the attack was likely unprovoked. On December 24, Zapeta-Calil was arraigned and entered no plea. During the arraignment, the prosecutor stated that Zapeta-Calil had told police he had been drinking heavily and did not remember what had happened.

== Reactions ==
The New York Times observed: "She died from burns and smoke inhalation. It took the medical examiner’s office days to identify her. But since Kawam’s name emerged, her story has become one that is likely to remain in New Yorkers’ memories."

New York City Mayor Eric Adams tweeted that, "This type of depraved behavior has no place in our subways and we are committed to working hard to ensure there is swift justice for all victims of violent crime.” He thanked the bystanders who reported the suspect to the police. New York City Police Commissioner Jessica Tisch stated that the immolation was "one of the most depraved crimes one person could possibly commit against another human being." Tom Homan, who was the incoming border czar at the time of the attack, criticized Eric Adams and Kathy Hochul, governor of New York, for making New York City a "sanctuary for illegal immigrants."

Eric Gonzalez, the Brooklyn District Attorney, stated, "This gruesome and senseless act of violence against a vulnerable woman will be met with the most serious consequences."

Many people expressed outrage online at the several New York City Police Department officers who stood outside of the train and watched as the victim burned.

== See also ==
- 2025 Chicago train immolation
- Crime in New York City
- Illegal immigration to the United States and crime
- Violence against homeless people
