= Save Me (Joelle Hadjia song) =

Single by Joelle Hadjia
- Released: 15 April 2014
- Recorded: 2014
- Genre: Pop; R&B; soul
- Length: 3:36
- Songwriter: Joelle Hadjia
- Producer: Sergio Selim

Joelle Hadjia singles chronology
"Save Me" (2014)	"Balance" (2014)

Music video
- "Save Me" on YouTube

"Save Me" is a song by Australian singer Joelle Hadjia. The debut single, accompanied by a music video, was released on 15 April 2014.

== Track listing ==
- Digital download
1. "Save Me" – 3:36

== Credits and personnel ==
Recording

Mastered at Viking Lounge Mastering, Sydney

Personnel

- Joelle Hadjia – lead vocals and backing vocals, songwriter
- Sergio Selim – producer, music production, mixing, programming
- Paul Stefandis – mastered, programming

== Charts ==
"Save Me" debuted at number 56 on the ARIA Singles Chart.

Chart (2014)	Peak position
Australia (ARIA)	56
Australian Independent Artist Chart (AIR)	5
