= List of American Heiress episodes =

The following is an episode list for the MyNetworkTV telenovela American Heiress. This limited-run serial began on March 13, 2007, but finished early on July 18, 2007. Each two-hour installment airs on Tuesdays at 8:00 p.m. for two hours a week.

== Episodes ==
=== Episode 1: Lion King ===
Original Air Date: 13 March 2007

The Wakefield family are introduced. It was revealed that the father planned on leaving his fortune to Elizabeth, which Damien tried to stop by setting up a plane accident. Before Lionel had a chance to get to the airport, he was stopped by Danielle who worked for the FBI. She had worked with her fiance in the jungle when they witnessed his company selling weapons to American enemies. Before the two could get away, Danielle's fiance was killed. He brushed her off, but confronted Damien about this new information. While telling Damien how disappointed he is in his son, Lionel had a heart attack that landed him in the hospital. Meanwhile, Elizabeth boarded the plane that was being captained by JD Bruce. They got word that Mr. Wakefield had a heart attack and turned the plane around without telling Elizabeth their reasoning in an attempt to keep her calm.

=== Episode 2: Crash and Burn ===
Original Air Date: 13 March 2007

While flying Elizabeth back to see Lionel, the plane crashed in the jungles of Guatemala. The co-pilot was killed on impact while it appeared that Elizabeth and JD survived. Elizabeth pulled JD from the plane and worked on retrieving her luggage. When JD awoke, he worried that they would not be saved for days; while Elizabeth kept high hopes about being found within days. Back in the hospital, the Wakefield family continued to deal with the condition of their father and the family learned that their daughter's and sister's plane had crashed. With the news that his sister may be dead, Damien requested that they stop searching for Elizabeth. He figured that his plan may work out yet if his sister had died and his father did not survive surgery.

=== Episode 3: Jungle Fever ===
Original Air Date: 20 March 2007

Elizabeth and JD continued to fight on the island while growing closer. She almost drowned while bathing, but was saved by JD who was watching her. An unknowing JD and Elizabeth were in danger of being attacked by the locals in Guatemala who discovered part of the plane that they crashed in. Lionel lived through surgery and was almost killed by Damien who told him of his daughters supposed death and sent him into cardiac arrest. The episode ended with the appearance of the Wakefield children's mother who was thought to be dead.

=== Episode 4: Lions and Tigers and Bears ===
Original Air Date: 20 March 2007

Danielle confronted Damian about his involvement in the guns that she had seen with his family's company name branded on the side of the transport box. Later, Danielle went home and discovered a cracked porcelain doll that had a message attached, left by Damian. In the jungle, Elizabeth and JD begia to form a friendship. The two slept at the same camp. While they were asleep, the locals were getting closer and looked to kidnap Elizabeth and hold her for ransom. Finally, in the hospital Jordan was causing trouble with all of her children. In the past, Jordan wanted to be in her children's lives, but Lionel told her to leave and not to return. Most of the Wakefield children did not remember Jordan and only had memories told by their father. He told the children that their mother had an affair and left to Europe.

=== Episode 6: Patriot Games ===
Original Air Date: 27 March 2007
