= Teresa Molina-Gonzalez =

American attorney and judge

Teresa Molina-Gonzalez is an American attorney and judge serving on the Circuit Court of Cook County in Illinois. Appointed in 2019 and elected in 2020, she is the first Puerto Rican judge to hold a countywide judicial seat in Cook County. Before joining the bench, she spent nearly 18 years as a prosecutor in Chicago and has been an advocate for increased diversity within the judiciary.

Molina-Gonzalez came under intense public criticism in 2025 after releasing a man who had been arrested 71 times on electronic monitoring despite a prosecutor's request for detention. Days later, the man was accused of setting a woman on fire on a Chicago train.

== Early life and education ==
Molina-Gonzalez is from Cleveland, Ohio and is of Puerto Rican descent. Influenced by her grandmother and her mother, a social worker who stressed the value of education, she studied criminal justice and sociology in college and later attended law school with the goal of becoming a prosecutor. While in law school, attending the “Prosecutorial Opportunities Symposium” in Chicago and meeting Latina prosecutors led to a career in public service and the judiciary.

Molina-Gonzalez earned a bachelor's degree from Ashland University and a Juris Doctor from the Michael E. Moritz College of Law at Ohio State University in 2001.

== Career ==
After completing her education, Molina-Gonzalez moved to Chicago, where she began her legal career as a prosecutor. She worked in the field for nearly 18 years. She was appointed by the Illinois Supreme Court as Cook County judge in July 2019 and was elected to the position in 2020. She is the first Puerto Rican to be appointed and elected to a countywide judicial seat in Cook County. She serves in the Fourth Municipal District in Maywood, Illinois. During her tenure, she has supported increasing diversity in the judiciary, emphasizing its importance for public confidence and equitable legal outcomes.

In November 2025, Molina-Gonzalez faced public scrutiny after denying a prosecutor's request to detain Lawrence Reed, who had a history of multiple arrests and felony convictions. Instead, she ordered his release with electronic monitoring. Days later, Reed was accused of setting a woman on fire on a Chicago train. The incident drew widespread criticism and prompted debate over the use of electronic monitoring in Illinois. Many criticized Molina-Gonzalez's decision as part of broader policies regarding judicial discretion and public safety in Cook County.
