= Pierre Vogel =

German Muslim preacher

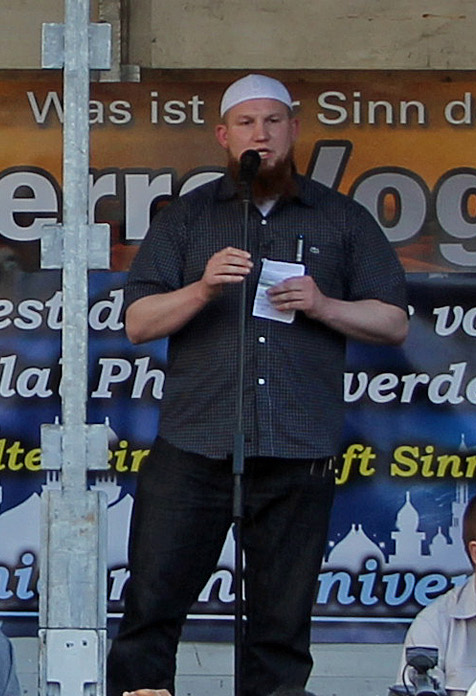

Personal information
- Nationality: (Germany) German
- Born: Pierre Vogel; July 20, 1978 (age 48) Frechen, North Rhine-Westphalia, West Germany
- Height: 6 ft 0 in (183 cm)

Boxing career
- Stance: ?

Boxing record
- Total fights: 7
- Wins: 6
- Win by KO: 2
- Losses: 0
- Draws: 1

Pierre Vogel (born July 20, 1978), also known as Abu Hamza (Arabic: أبو حمزة), is a German Islamic preacher and a former professional boxer.

== Early life and boxing career ==
Vogel was born in Frechen. He turned professional at the age of 22, fighting briefly (for two years) as a cruiserweight for the Sauerland club and was undefeated in seven bouts.

== Conversion to Islam ==
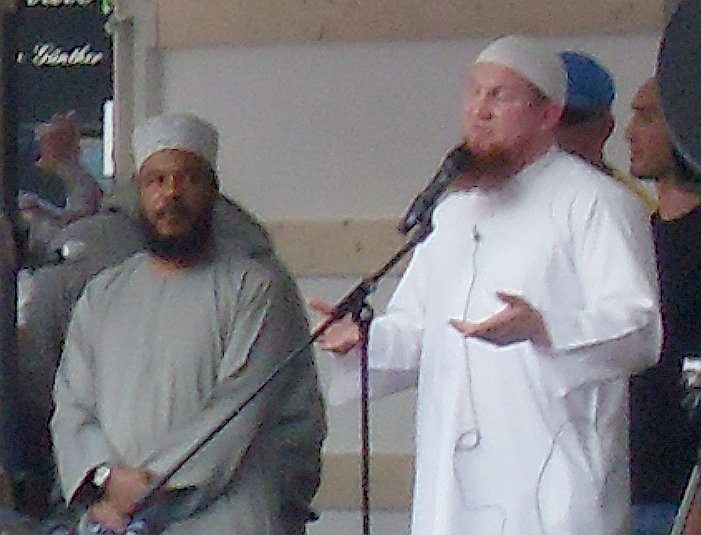
Pierre Vogel (on the right) and Bilal Philips speaking at a rally in Frankfurt, April 2011

Vogel converted to Islam in 2001 and shortly thereafter began courses in Islamic studies in Germany, and then studied in Medina. He is considered to be one of the most influential Muslims in Germany.

== Personal life ==
Vogel is married to a Muslim Moroccan woman and father of three children.

== Media perception ==
He has been described in one German report as a "radical Muslim", while Matthias Matussek, author and commentator for Der Spiegel, described him as representative of the "dark Nazi variant" of Islam in Germany.

When he appeared at a Muslim meeting in Dillingen, Saarland, 25 April 2010, he said that polygamy is legitimate due to the fact that there are more women than men in Germany.

In January 2016, Vogel shared a video giving out the personal details of a woman who claimed to have been raped by men of Middle Eastern appearance in Cologne during New Year's, claiming that she had falsified her story in order to slander Islam. The video's creator deleted it after a legal challenge from the victim.
