= Markus Posset =

Austrian media entrepreneur

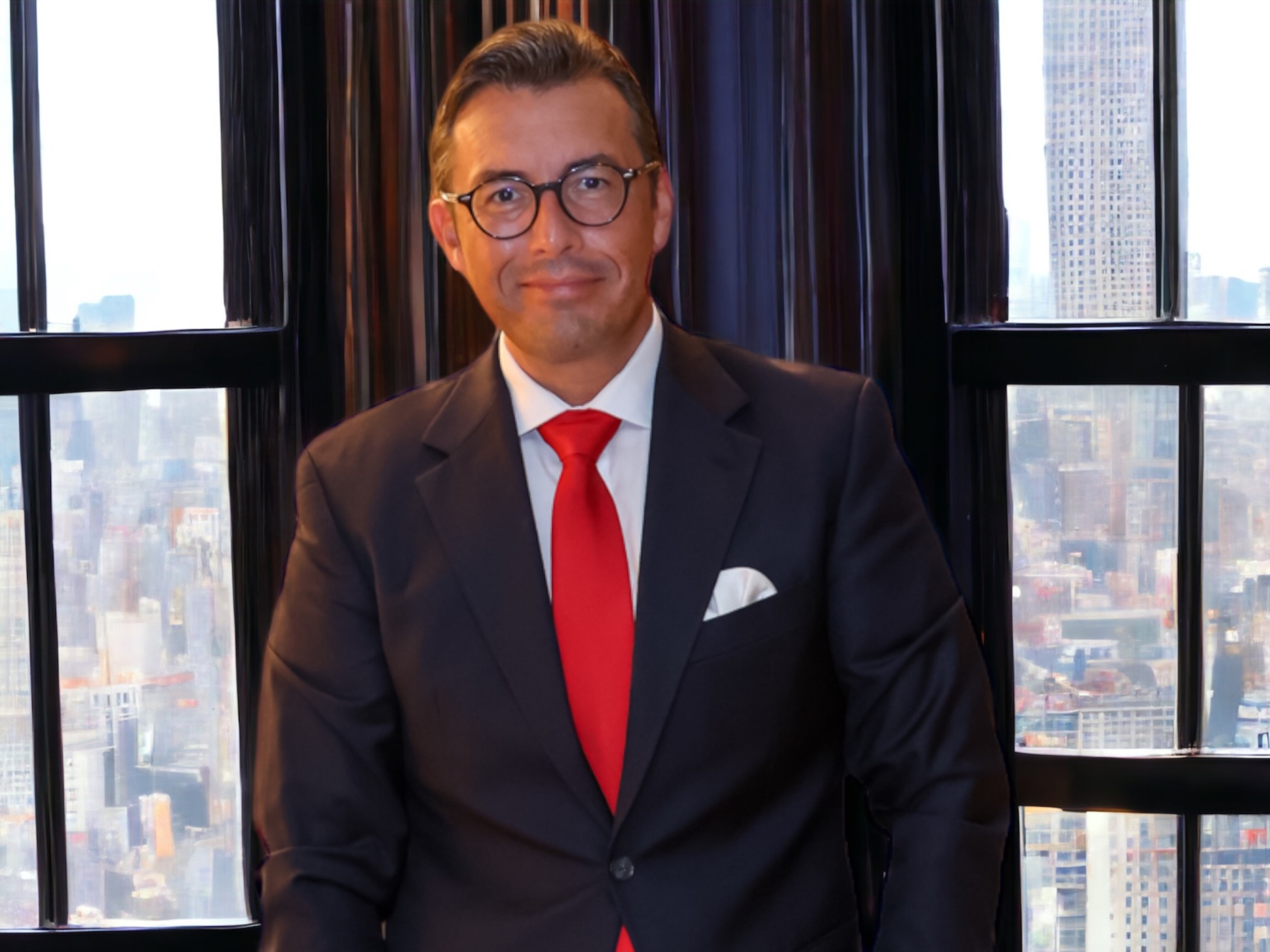
- Posset in 2022
- Born: 15 April 1976 (age 50); Mödling, Austria
- Citizenship: Austrian
- Occupations: Media entrepreneur, lobbyist
- Years active: 1990s–present
- Known for: Media management; Honorary Consul of Albania in Austria
- Awards: Decoration of Honour in Gold for Services to the Republic of Austria

Markus Posset (born 15 April 1976 in Mödling, Austria) is an Austrian media entrepreneur, lobbyist and investor. He has been awarded the Decoration of Honour for Services to the Republic of Austria in Gold and is Honorary Consul of the Republic of Albania in Austria. Posset is also a best-selling author of several books.

== Education ==
Posset completed an apprenticeship as a communications engineer with the Austrian Federal Railways (ÖBB) and completed studies in Business Administration (Magister), in Work and Process Psychology (MSc) and in Sales & Marketing (Executive MBA).

== Career ==
Posset worked in management positions at Echo Medienhaus Group, most recently being COO of the group. At the end of 2016, he left the group and in 2017 became managing director at the Verlagsgruppe News (VGN), being responsible for the magazines Trend and Profil. In May 2018, he became managing director for the magazine division of the media group Österreich. In 2023, Posset became the new chairman of the board of directors of Star Troopers Media, Entertainment und Investment AG in Switzerland and CEO of the Star Troopers Holding in Austria.

In January 2021, Posset was awarded the Decoration of Honour for Services to the Republic of Austria in Gold by resolution of the Austrian federal President Alexander Van der Bellen of 14 January 2021, acknowledging his services to the Austrian media landscape. In May 2021, he was appointed Honorary Consul of the Republic of Albania in Austria.

== Publications ==
- Posset, Markus & Quinton, Aaron (2022). Balkan-Express - Eine Geschichte über die Wahrheit. edition a GmbH (1st edition). Vienna. ISBN 978-3-99001-636-7
- Posset, Markus (2022). Medienökonomie: Alles, was Sie über Print, Fernsehen, Radio und Internet wissen müssen. Springer Gabler. Wiesbaden. ISBN 978-3-658-38441-8
- Posset, Markus (2021). Breaking News - Der Medienwahnsinn und seine Zukunftsaussichten (in German). Edition A. ISBN 3-99001-569-9
- Posset, Markus; Binderlehner, Franz (2023). Führungskräfte-Mentalität I Die Macht des starken Mindsets (in German). Star Troopers Publishing. ISBN 978-3951977805.
