= Save Me (DaBaby song) =

Song by DaBaby
- Released: September 16, 2025
- Recorded: 2025
- Genre: Hip-hop; R&B
- Length: 3:40

"Save Me" is a 2025 song by DaBaby and is dedicated to Iryna Zarutska, who was murdered during the light rail incident in Charlotte, North Carolina.

== Background ==
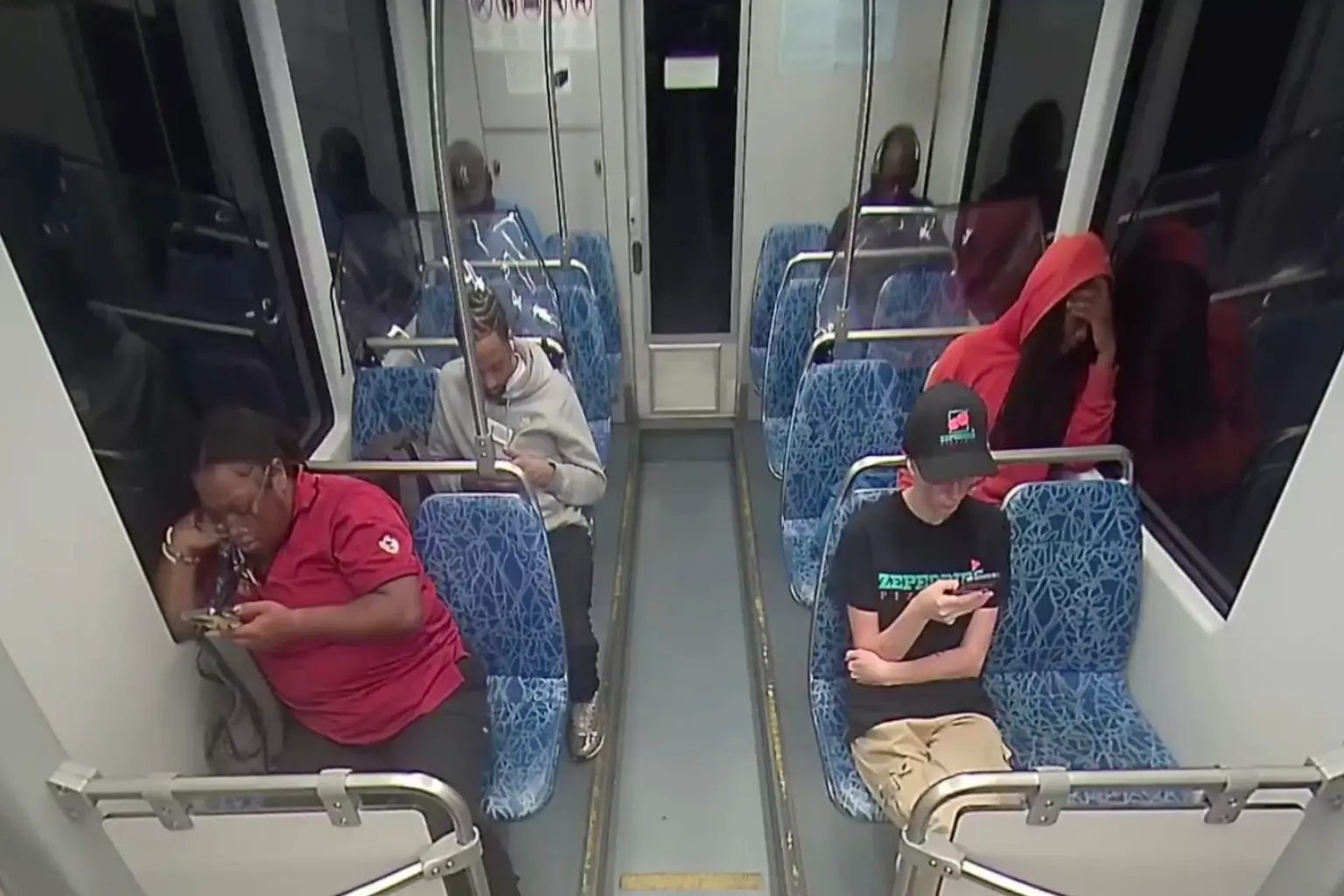
Decarlos Brown is seen sitting behind Zarutska. Therefore, the security footage is featured in the music video, as well as the reenactment of the incident.

On August 22, 2025, in Charlotte, Zarutska, a 23-year-old Ukrainian refugee, was stabbed to death by Decarlos Brown, and it caused people to feel "devastated and outraged."

== Song ==
DaBaby (real name Johnathan Lyndale Kirk) raps a song "Save Me" in dedication to Iryna Zarutska. The tribute song of Zarutska aims to remind others of "safety and compassion," and not solely highlighting the stabbing that ended Zarutska's life.

== Music video ==
The music video was premiered on YouTube on Tuesday, September 16, 2025, and it was directed by DaBaby himself.

In the beginning of the music video, the security footage shows Zarutska who is seen boarding the Blue Line light rail and sitting down, then the video progresses to the reenactment of the incident. The reenactment of the incident includes two actors–Natalie Jones and KenDarius "Too" Hargrove–who play as Zarutska and Brown, respectively. DaBaby is sitting adjacent to Brown, then the video ends with DaBaby grabbing Brown's wrist while the latter attempts to stab Zarutska to death, which is the alternate to the incident.
