= 2016 Hamburg stabbing attack =

Crime in Hamburg, Germany

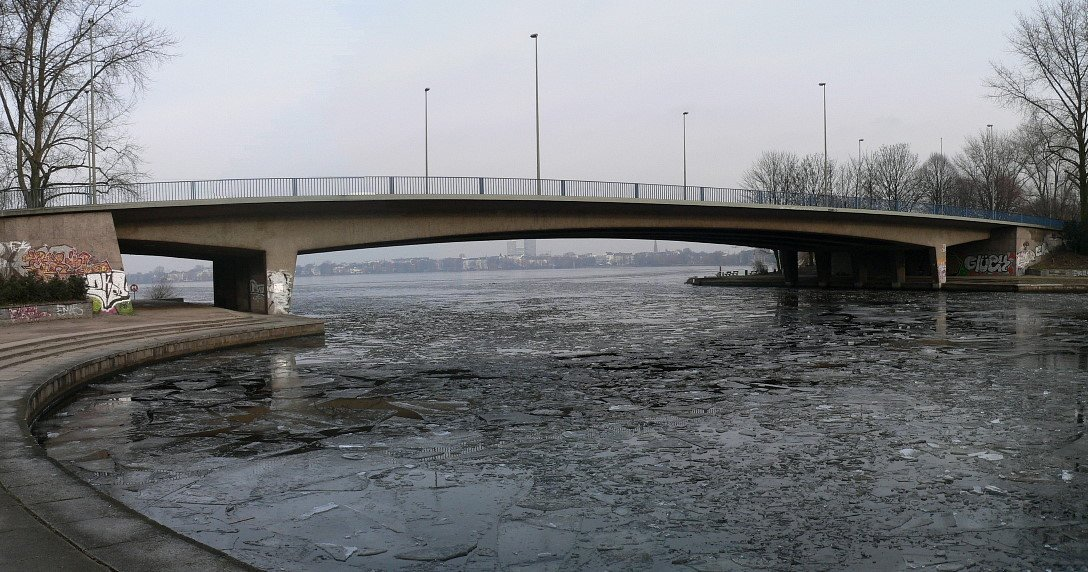
Kennedybrücke (Kennedy bridge) in Hamburg

The 2016 Hamburg stabbing attack, also referred to as Murder at the Alster or Alster Murder, was an attack on 16 October 2016 in the city of Hamburg, Germany. A 23- to 25-year-old man "of southern appearance" was named as the suspect. On 30 October 2016, the Islamic State (IS) claimed responsibility for the attack, though police later said a terrorist background or motive for the attack was "unlikely".

== Attack ==
In the evening of 16 October 2016, a 16-year-old boy, named by the police as Viktor E., was stabbed near the Kennedybrücke, (Kennedy bridge), over the Alster lake in Hamburg at around 10:00 p.m. His 15-year-old girlfriend, who was sitting with him on the stairs near the waterfront, was also thrown into the water by the assailant. She managed to swim to the shore again while the perpetrator ran away. Viktor E. died in the hospital shortly afterwards. His girlfriend was not injured.

== Investigation ==
Though the police dispersed flyers, no eyewitnesses were initially found, while divers attempted to find the knife in the water, but to no avail. The police agency admitted that it had no knowledge about the possible motivation of the perpetrator. On 27 October, police tried to reconstruct the murder at the crime scene. Specialists investigated the location of the crime scene again using metal detectors.

On 30 October, it was reported that IS had claimed responsibility for the attack. Their news website Amaq claimed that a "soldier of the caliphate" had carried out the stabbing. Hamburg police confirmed the claim, and acknowledged that federal security authorities (Staatsschutz) were involved in the investigation. The IS statement wrongly claimed that two people were attacked with a knife.

During the investigation, Hamburg police contacted about 11,500 Hamburg doctors, operating under the assumption that the perpetrator was injured himself during the attack. Hamburg Medical Council suspended the obligation to secrecy for the doctors in the city in this case, but no significant developments emerged from the effort.

On 2 November, it was reported that a female eyewitness had probably seen the perpetrator on the day of the attack, loitering near the crime scene. A facial composite of him was created and published by the police. Police also reconstructed the last route of Viktor E. and his girlfriend from Steindamm, an inner city street, via Lohmühlenstraße station, to Jungfernstieg, and then to Kennedybrücke. The perpetrator may have followed his victims through that route.

On 14 November, the mother of Viktor E. appealed to the public for assistance in the investigation; few useful clues had been provided to the police by then, although they posted handbills in several languages throughout the city. On 30 November, police stuck bills in about 170 residences used by refugees located all over the city.

Police acknowledged that they had received 360 clues in total by 30 November, but that there were no significant developments in the case by then. Police said that they considered a terrorist background or motive unlikely.

== Suspect ==
The suspect was described as a 23- to 25-year-old man "of southern appearance". He was approximately 1.8 to 1.9 m. tall, had dark hair, and a three-day stubble. He was wearing jeans and a brown pullover.

== Reactions ==
On 23 October, friends and relatives of Viktor E. mourned at the location of the murder. Some AfD supporters demonstrated as well; one of them was arrested. 70 left-wing protesters held a counter-demonstration.

Davis Lewin of the Henry Jackson Society stated that the "profile of the attack fits to the new strategy of IS". He said it was "highly unlikely" that IS "jumps on an alien act of violence as a free rider".

== See also ==
- February 2016 Hanover stabbing
- Immigration and crime in Germany
