= Swamp holly =

Swamp holly is a common name for several hollies and may refer to:

- Ilex amelanchier, the swamp holly proper
- Ilex decidua (meadow holly)
- Ilex verticillata (American winterberry), native to eastern North America
