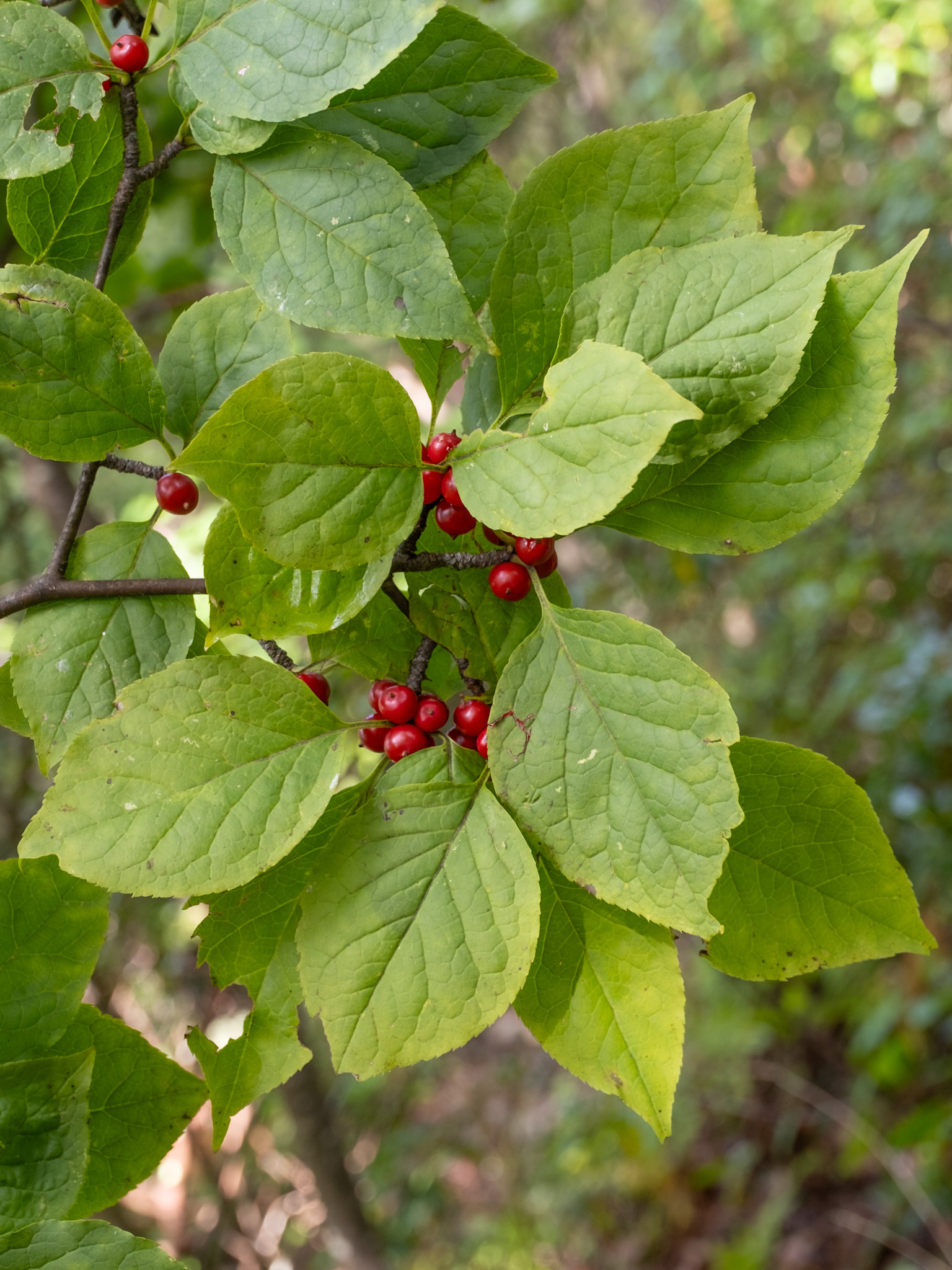

Conservation status
- Least Concern (IUCN 3.1)

Scientific classification
- Kingdom: Plantae
- Clade: Tracheophytes
- Clade: Angiosperms
- Clade: Eudicots
- Clade: Asterids
- Order: Aquifoliales
- Family: Aquifoliaceae
- Genus: Ilex
- Species: I. montana

Binomial name
- Ilex montana Torrey & A.Gray
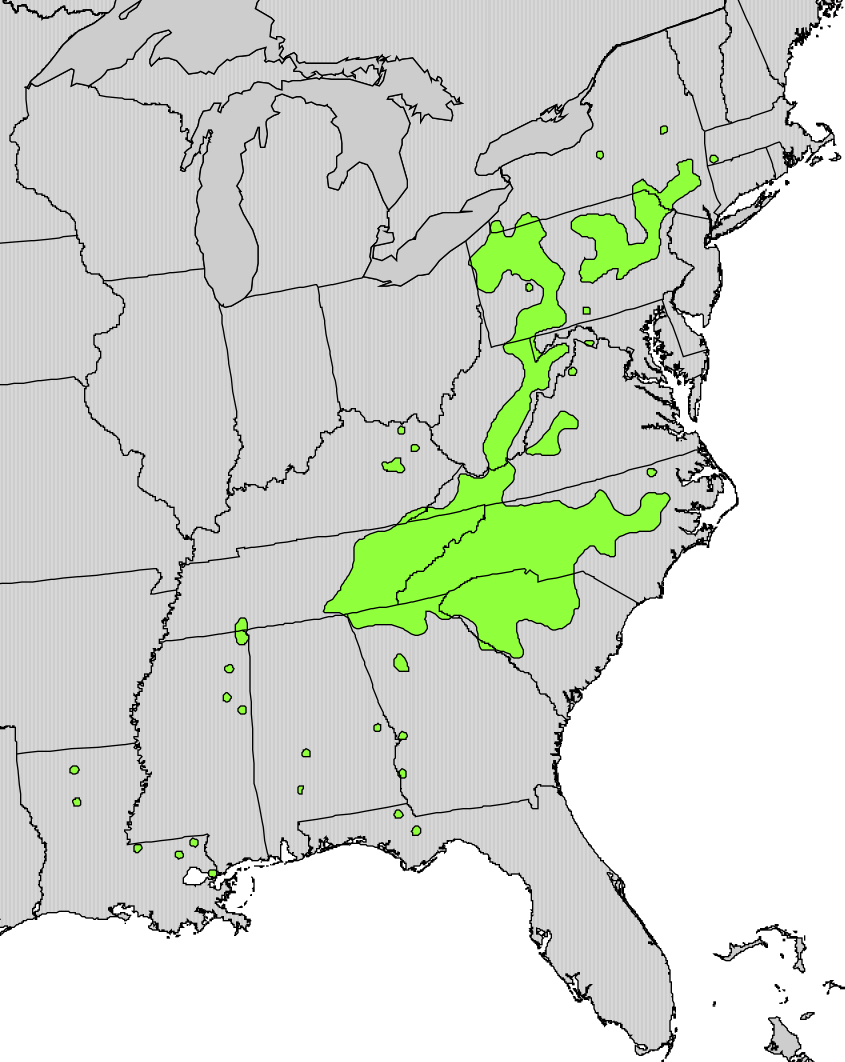
- Natural range

= Ilex montana =

Species of holly

Ilex montana, the mountain winterberry (or "mountain holly" which is more typically Ilex mucronata), is a species of holly native to the Eastern United States, ranging along the Appalachian Mountains from southeast Massachusetts to northeast Alabama and northern Georgia. Synonyms include Ilex monticola.

== Description ==
Ilex montana is a deciduous shrub or small tree growing to 9–12 metres (30–39 ft) tall. The leaves are 3–9 cm long and 2–5 cm broad, light green, ovate or oblong, wedge-shaped or rounded at the base and acute at apex, with a serrated margin and an acuminate apex; they do not suggest the popular idea of a holly, with no spines or bristles. The leaves turn yellow before dropping in late autumn.

The flowers are 4–5 mm diameter, with a four-lobed white corolla, appearing in late spring when the leaves are more than half grown. The fruit is a spherical bright red drupe 8–10 mm diameter, containing four seeds.

== Taxonomy ==
It is treated by some botanists as a variety of the related Ilex ambigua (Sand Holly), as I. ambigua var. monticola; the two are sometimes mistaken for each other in the U.S. southeastern coastal plain. The Latin specific epithet montana refers to mountains or coming from mountains.
