= Ilex khasiana =

Conservation status
- Critically Endangered (IUCN 2.3)

Scientific classification
- Kingdom: Plantae
- Clade: Tracheophytes
- Clade: Angiosperms
- Clade: Eudicots
- Clade: Asterids
- Order: Aquifoliales
- Family: Aquifoliaceae
- Genus: Ilex
- Species: I. khasiana

Binomial name
- Ilex khasiana Purakaystha

Species of holly

Ilex khasiana is a species of plant in the family Aquifoliaceae. It is endemic to Meghalaya state in northeast India. Four very rare specimens grow on Shillong Peak, 10 km west of Shillong, Meghalaya.
