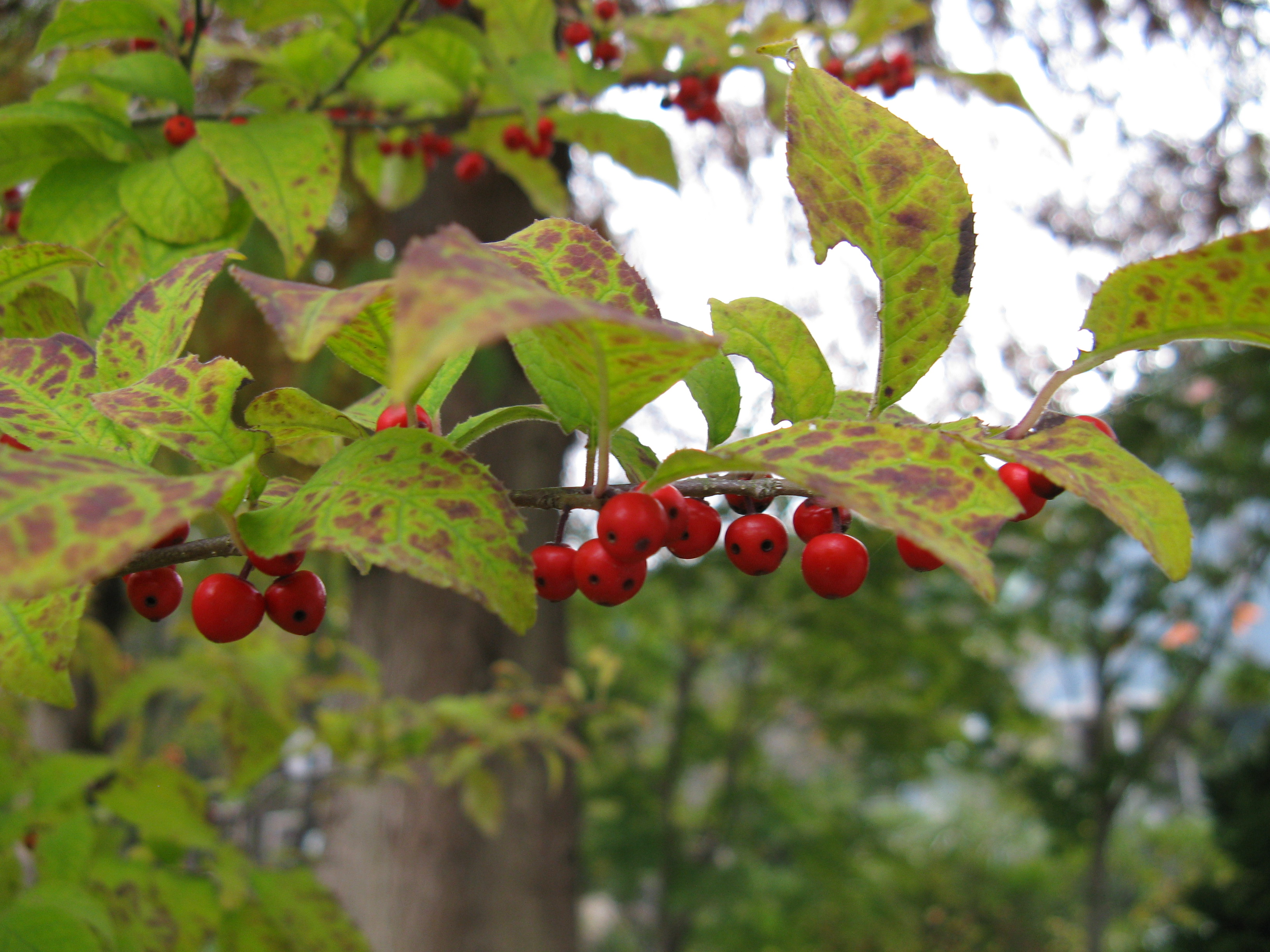

Scientific classification
- Kingdom: Plantae
- Clade: Tracheophytes
- Clade: Angiosperms
- Clade: Eudicots
- Clade: Asterids
- Order: Aquifoliales
- Family: Aquifoliaceae
- Genus: Ilex
- Species: I. serrata

Binomial name
- Ilex serrata Thunb.

= Ilex serrata =

Species of holly

Ilex serrata is a species in the Ilex (holly) genus and the family Aquifoliaceae. It is an evergreen shrub or small tree up to about 4.5 m high. In Japan where it naturally occurs, it is a hardy species with ovate dark green leaves, pink flowers and red berries on the female plant.
