= Ilex quercetorum =

Conservation status
- Least Concern (IUCN 3.1)

Scientific classification
- Kingdom: Plantae
- Clade: Tracheophytes
- Clade: Angiosperms
- Clade: Eudicots
- Clade: Asterids
- Order: Aquifoliales
- Family: Aquifoliaceae
- Genus: Ilex
- Species: I. quercetorum

Binomial name
- Ilex quercetorum I.M. Johnston

Species of holly

Ilex quercetorum is a species of plant in the family Aquifoliaceae. It is found in Guatemala and Mexico. It is threatened by habitat loss.

== Description ==
Ilex quercetorum is tree which grows from 6 to 15 meters tall, with a trunk up to 25 cm in diameter.

== Range and habitat ==
Ilex quercetorum is native to the southern Mexico, Guatemala, and Honduras. In Mexico it lives in the Sierra Madre de Oaxaca Veracruz and Oaxaca states and in the Chiapas Highlands and Sierra Madre de Chiapas of Chiapas, and in the highlands of Guatemala and Honduras.

It inhabits cloud forests and humid oak and pine forests from 200 to 2,500 meters elevation.
