= Ilex sinica =

Conservation status
- Least Concern (IUCN 3.1)

Scientific classification
- Kingdom: Plantae
- Clade: Tracheophytes
- Clade: Angiosperms
- Clade: Eudicots
- Clade: Asterids
- Order: Aquifoliales
- Family: Aquifoliaceae
- Genus: Ilex
- Species: I. sinica

Binomial name
- Ilex sinica (Loes.) S.Y.Hu

Synonyms
- Ilex malabarica var. sinica Loes.

Species of flowering plant

Ilex sinica is a species of flowering plant in the holly family, Aquifoliaceae. It is native to Yunnan and Guangxi provinces of China. A morphological and genetic study showed that it is basal in its genus.
