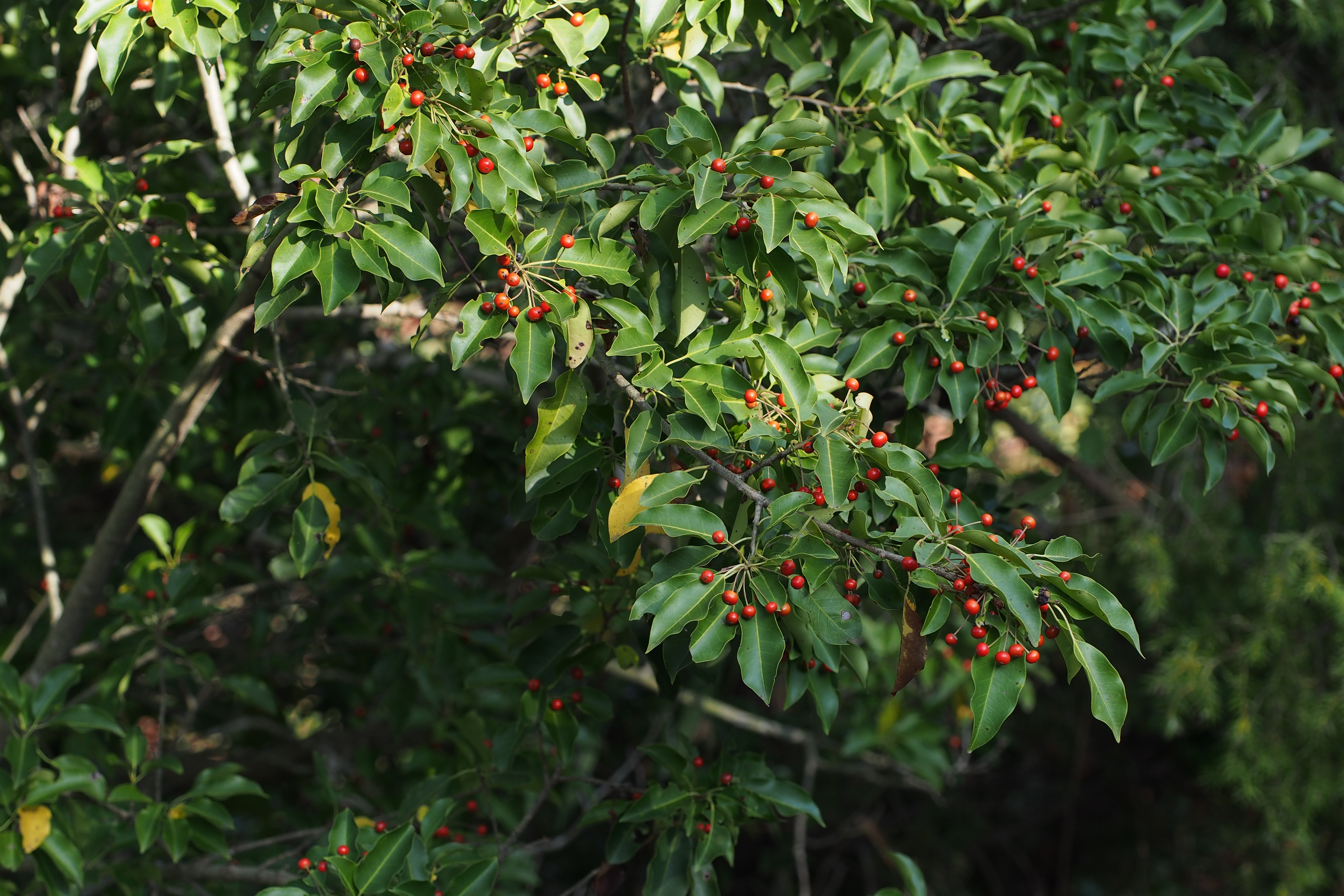
- Habit

Scientific classification
- Kingdom: Plantae
- Clade: Tracheophytes
- Clade: Angiosperms
- Clade: Eudicots
- Clade: Asterids
- Order: Aquifoliales
- Family: Aquifoliaceae
- Genus: Ilex
- Species: I. pedunculosa

Binomial name
- Ilex pedunculosa Miq.

Synonyms
- List: Ilex impressivena Yamam.; Ilex morii Yamam.; Ilex pedunculosa f. longipedunculata S.Watan.; Ilex senjoensis Hayashi

= Ilex pedunculosa =

Species of flowering plant

Ilex pedunculosa, called longstalk holly, is a species of flowering plant in the genus Ilex, native to central and southern China, Taiwan, and Japan. A lanky shrub or shrubby tree typically reaching 5 m (16 ft) in the garden, it is quite cold hardy (to USDA zone 5a). It gets its specific epithet and common name from its long peduncle (the stalk from which the berry depends). The red berries are relished by birds. It is deer resistant.
