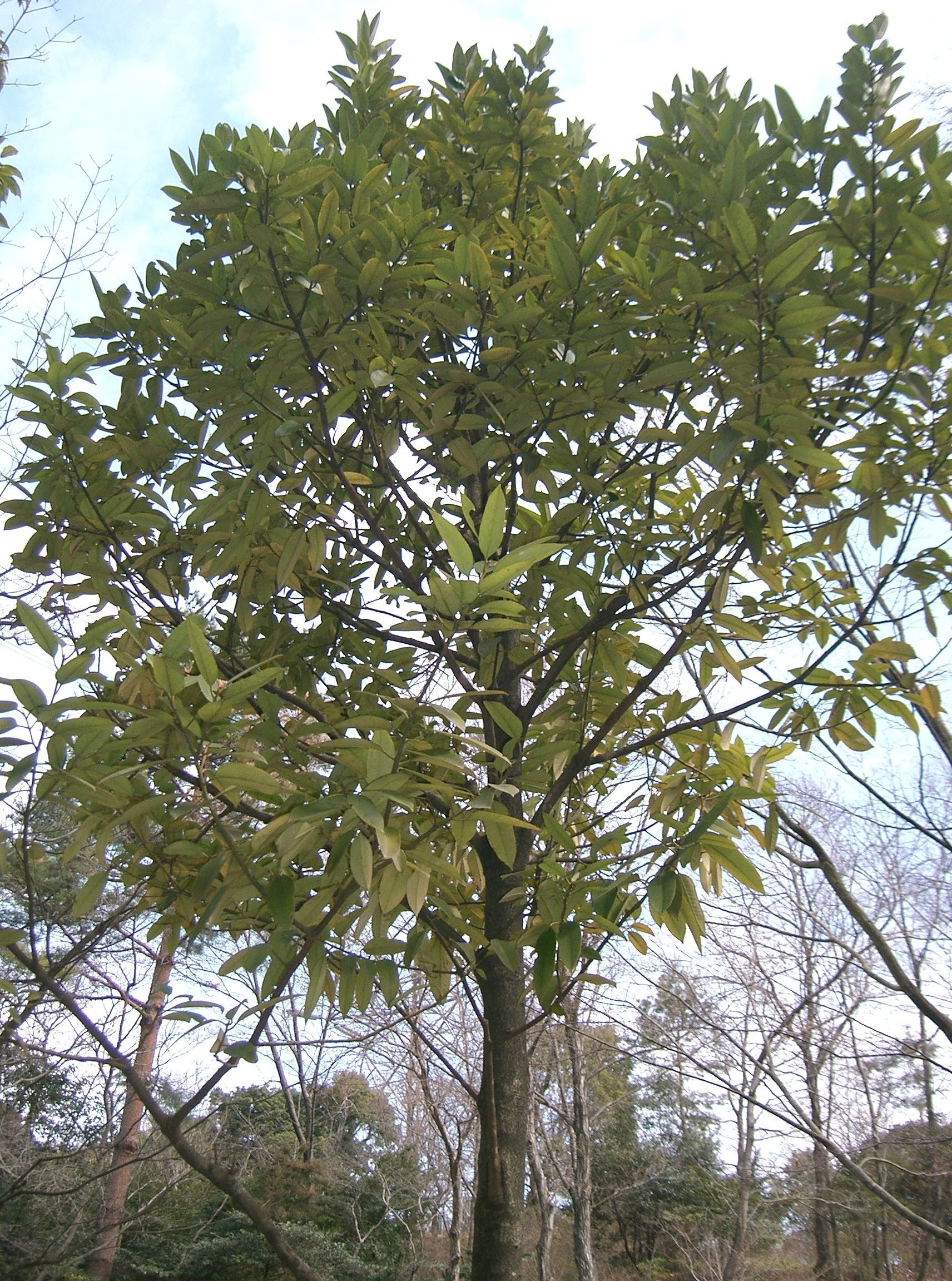
- Tree in Osaka-fu, Japan

Scientific classification
- Kingdom: Plantae
- Clade: Tracheophytes
- Clade: Angiosperms
- Clade: Eudicots
- Clade: Asterids
- Order: Aquifoliales
- Family: Aquifoliaceae
- Genus: Ilex
- Species: I. latifolia

Binomial name
- Ilex latifolia Thunb.

= Ilex latifolia =

Species of holly

Ilex latifolia (tarajo holly or tarajo; Japanese: 多羅葉 (たらよう, tarayō), Chinese: 大叶冬青 dà yè dōngqīng) is a species of holly, native to southern Japan (Shizuoka Prefecture south to Kyūshū) and eastern and southern China (Jiangsu south to Fujian and west to Yunnan), growing in broadleaf forests at altitudes of 200–1,500 m.

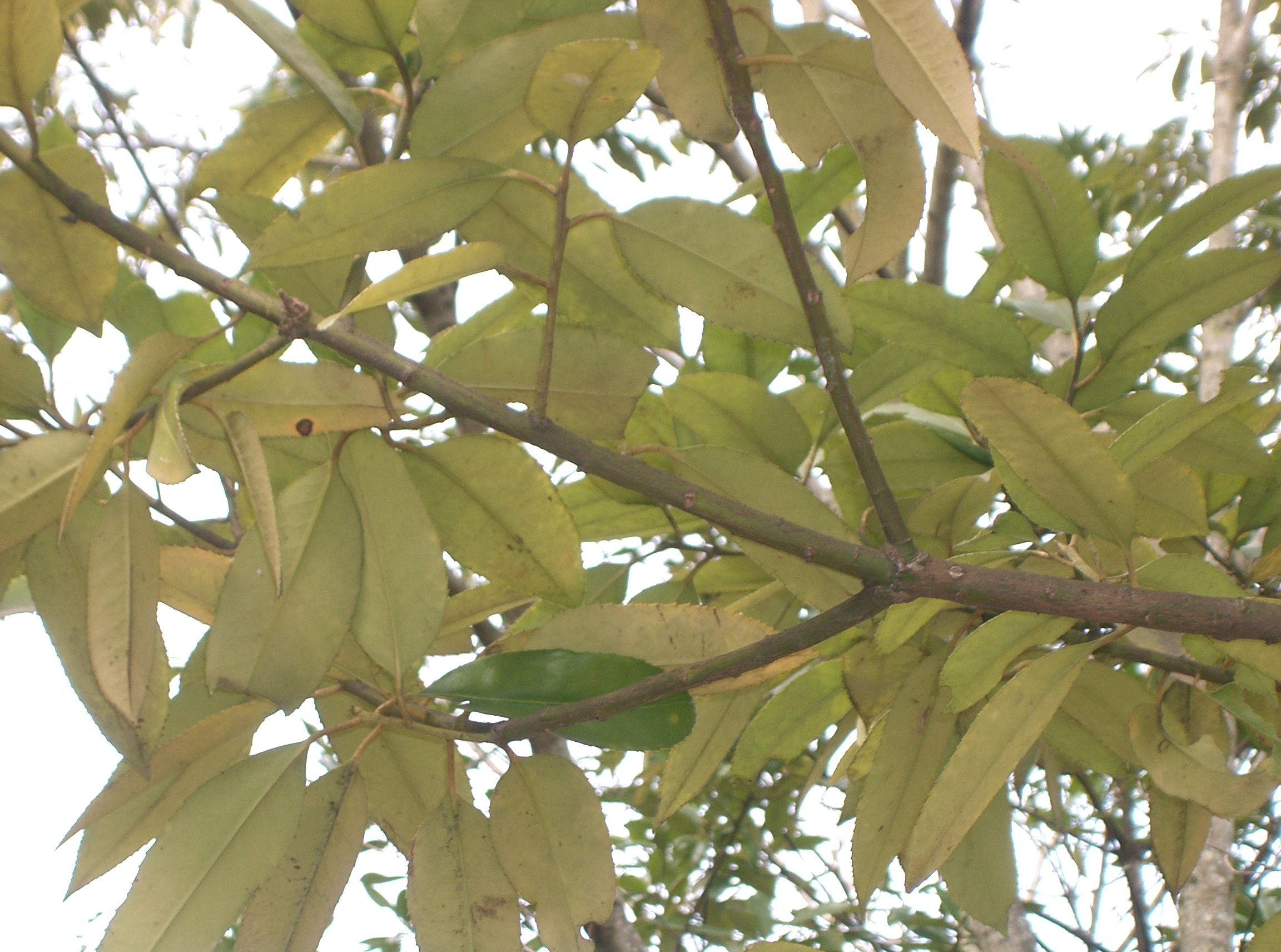
Foliage, showing pale underside of leaves, one leaf showing the dark upper side

It is a small to medium-sized evergreen tree growing to 10–20 m tall with a trunk up to 60 cm diameter. The bark is dark brown, with a rough surface. The leaves are alternate, broad lanceolate to ovate-oblong, 8–24 cm long and 4–8 cm broad (among the largest of any species of holly), glossy dark green above, paler below, with a thick, leathery texture and serrated (but not spiny) margins. The flowers are yellowish-green, with a four-lobed corolla, produced in late spring; it is dioecious, with male and female flowers on separate trees. The fruit is a drupe 7 mm diameter, ripening orange-red to dark red in winter, and containing four seeds; they are often produced in dense clusters on the stems.

== Cultivation and uses ==
It is cultivated as an ornamental tree in parks and temple gardens. The leaves may be infused to make tea ("bitter nail tea" kǔ dīng chá).
