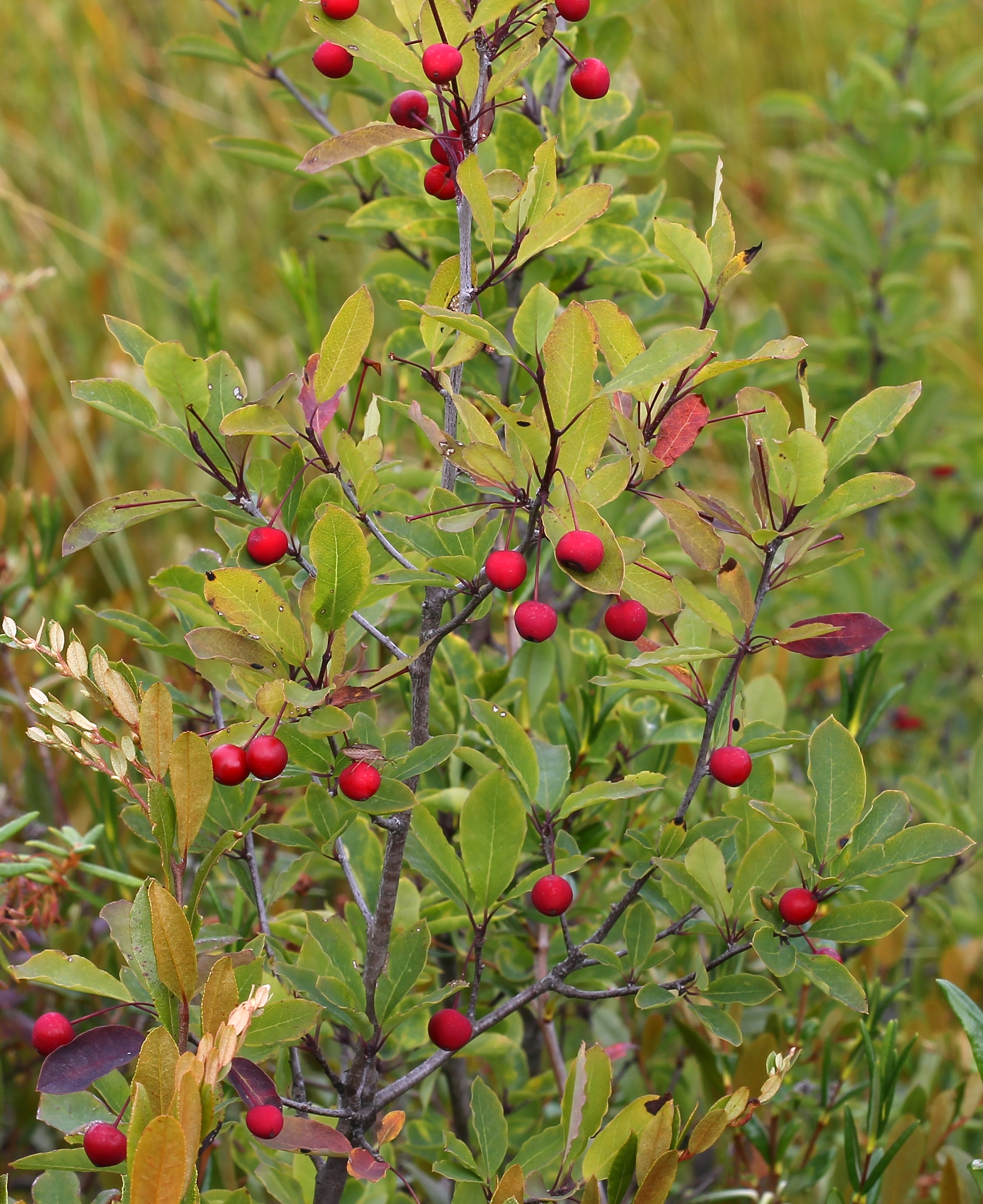

Conservation status
- Least Concern (IUCN 3.1)

Scientific classification
- Kingdom: Plantae
- Clade: Tracheophytes
- Clade: Angiosperms
- Clade: Eudicots
- Clade: Asterids
- Order: Aquifoliales
- Family: Aquifoliaceae
- Genus: Ilex
- Species: I. mucronata

Binomial name
- Ilex mucronata (L.) M.Powell, Savol., & S.Andrews

Synonyms
- Nemopanthus mucronatus

= Ilex mucronata =

Species of holly

Ilex mucronata, the mountain holly or catberry, is a species of holly native to eastern North America, from Newfoundland west to Minnesota, and south to Maryland and West Virginia.

== Taxonomy ==
It was formerly treated in its own monotypic genus as Nemopanthus mucronatus (L.) Loes., known as "false holly", but transferred to Ilex on molecular data; it is closely related to Ilex amelanchier.

== Description ==
Ilex mucronata is a deciduous shrub growing to 3 m (rarely 4 m) tall (or 6 to 10 feet high from the "Manual of Woody Landscape Plants" by Dr. Michael Dirr.) The leaves are alternate, simple, elliptic to oblong, (1 to 2.5" long and three-fourths as wide) 1.5–7 cm long and 1–3 cm broad, with an entire or finely serrated margin and an acute apex, and a 0.5–2 cm (1/4 to 1/2" long) petiole. The tiny flowers about 1/5" in diameter with four to five petals are inconspicuous, whitish to greenish-yellow, produced on slender peduncles 25 mm or more long; it is usually dioecious, with male and female flowers on separate plants. The fruit is a red drupe 6–7 mm (1/4 to 1/3") diameter containing three to five pits.

== Habitat ==
The plant does best in full sun, or part shade is good. It usually grows in moist or draining wet acid soils, often with the similar species of common winterberry, Ilex verticillata, but is also found on upland cliffs and slopes on hills and mountains. It develops a yellow autumn color. It is recommended for use in naturalistic landscapes. Its USDA hardiness zone recommendation is zones 4 to 6. The name "mountain holly" is also sometimes used for the related mountain winterberry (Ilex montana).

== Gallery ==
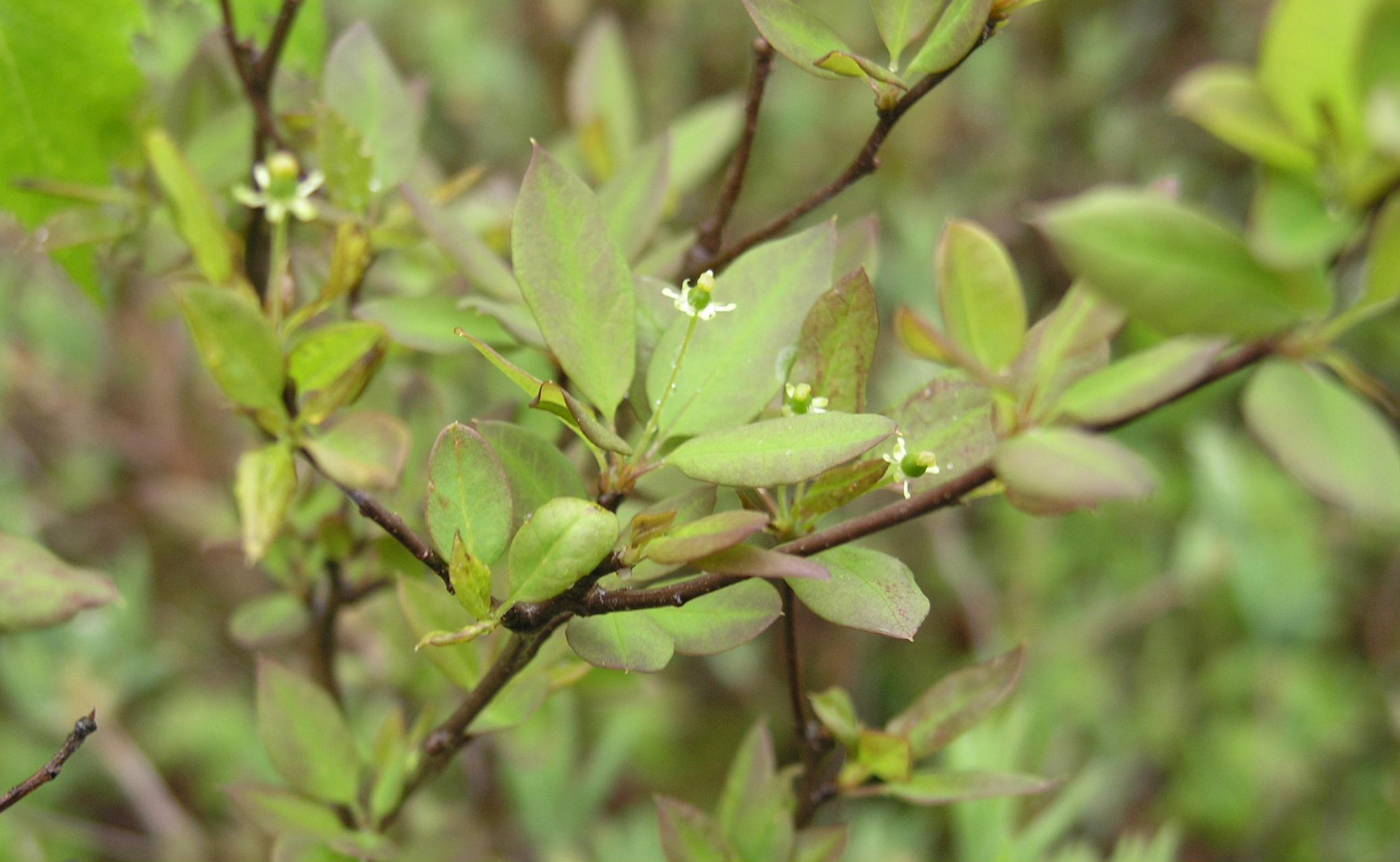
Female flowers in New Brunswick

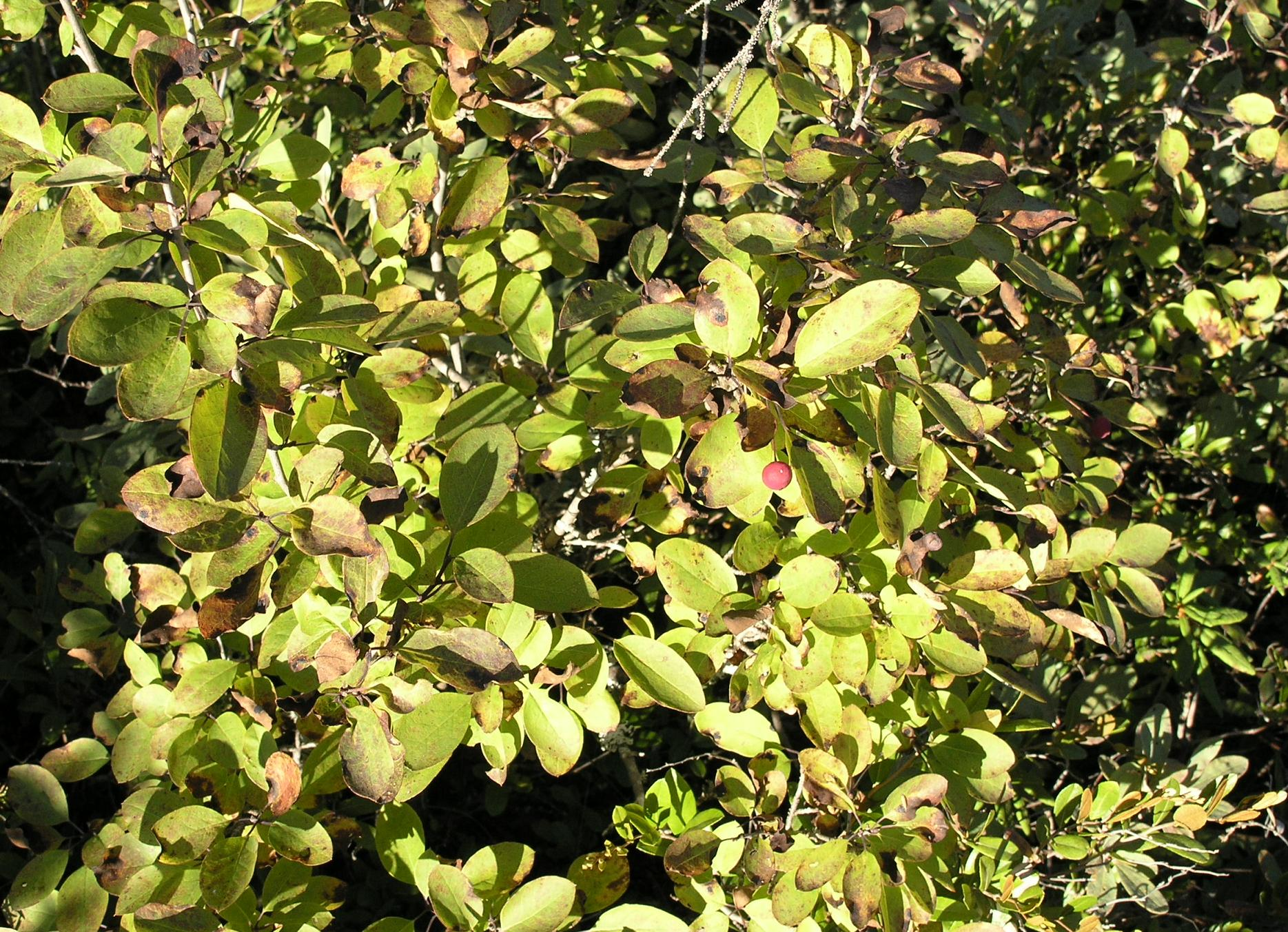
Fruit.
