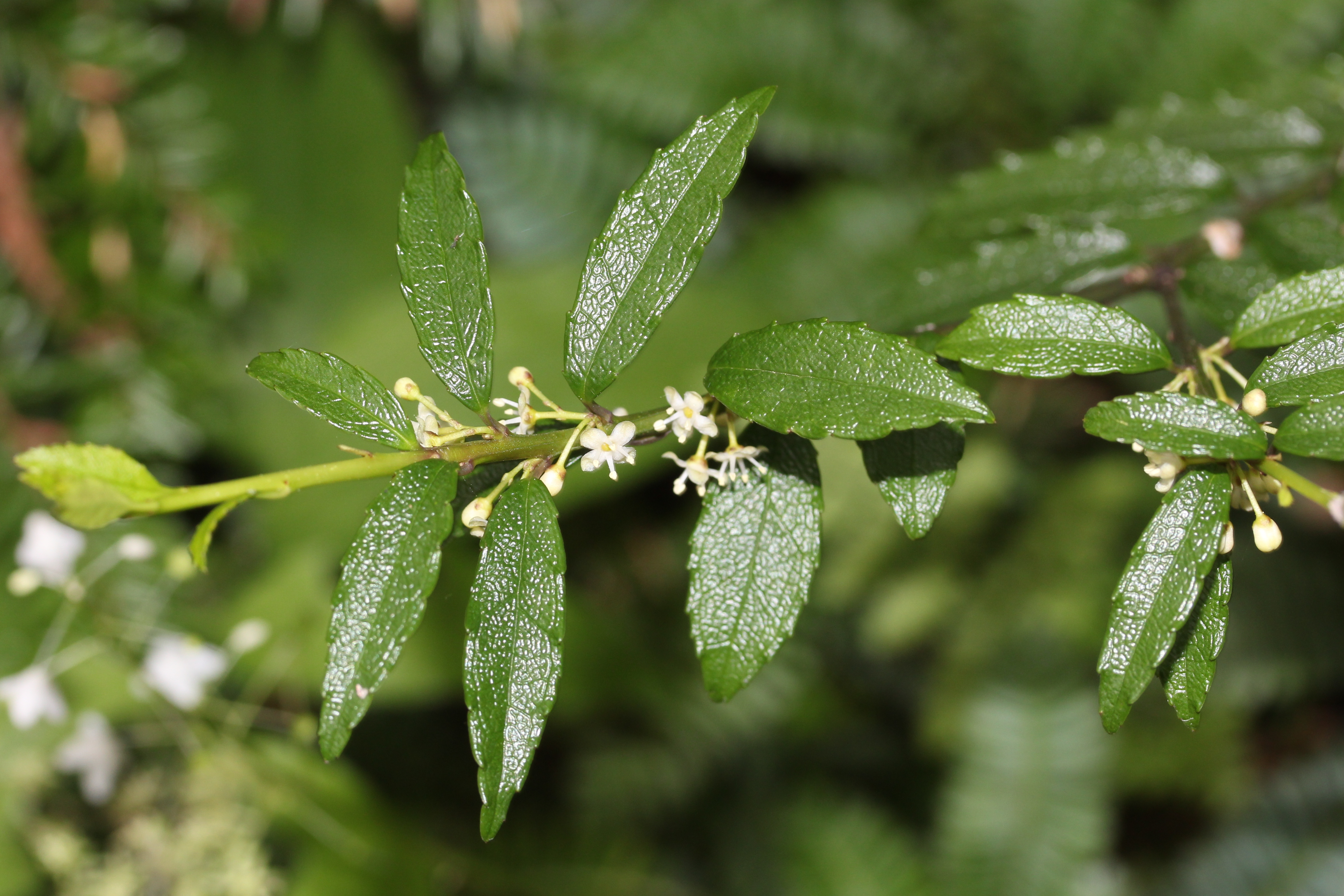
- Cruciform flowers are inconspicuous.
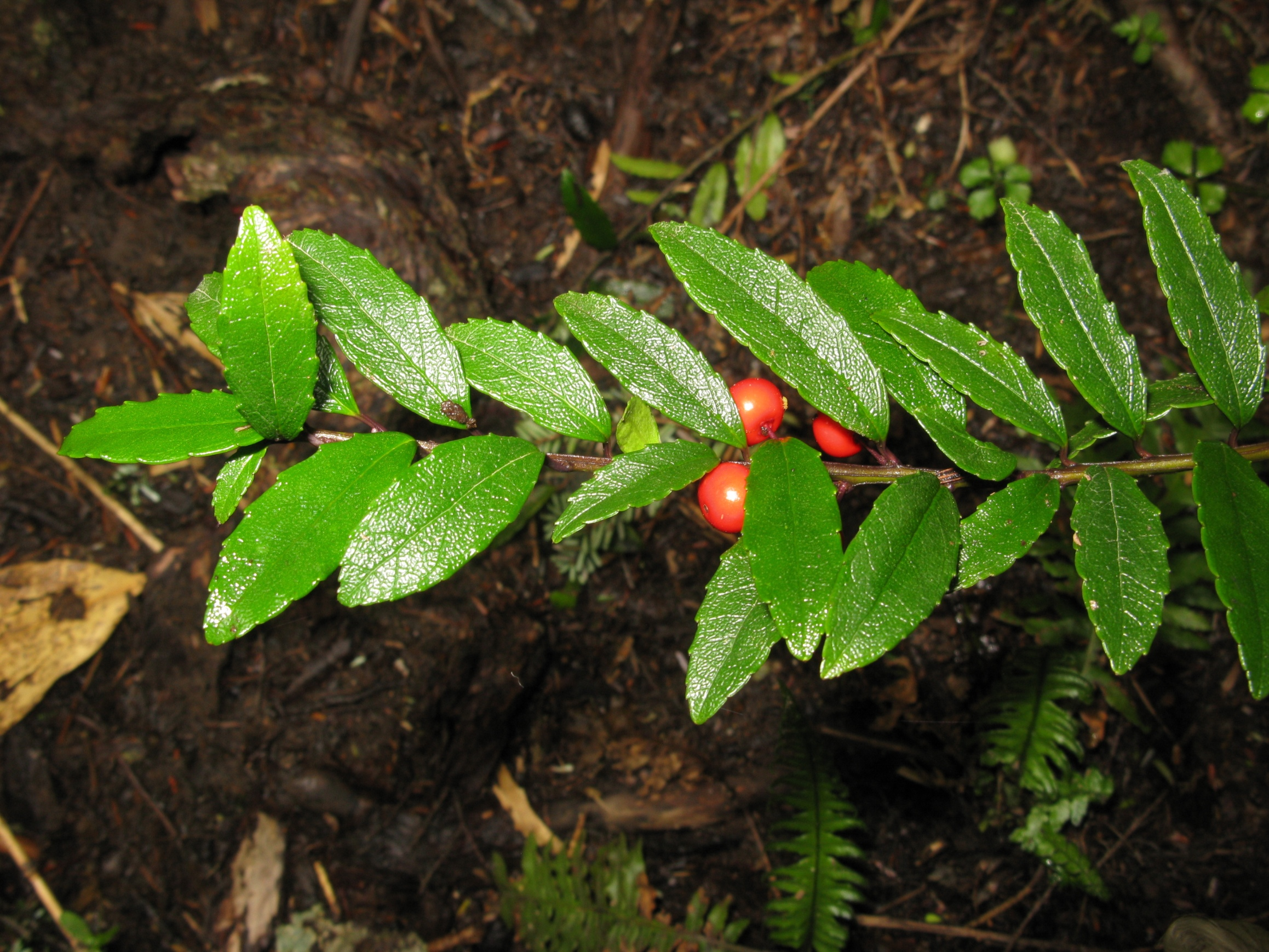
- Fruit are large for a holly.

Scientific classification
- Kingdom: Plantae
- Clade: Tracheophytes
- Clade: Angiosperms
- Clade: Eudicots
- Clade: Asterids
- Order: Aquifoliales
- Family: Aquifoliaceae
- Genus: Ilex
- Species: I. rugosa

Binomial name
- Ilex rugosa F.Schmidt

Synonyms
- Ilex rugosa var. hondoensis T.Yamaz.; Ilex stenophylla Koidz.

= Ilex rugosa =

Species of plant in the holly family

Ilex rugosa, the tsuru holly, is a species of flowering plant in the family Aquifoliaceae, native to southern Khabarovsk Krai, Sakhalin, and the Kuril Islands in Russia, and to eight mountain summits in Japan. It is usually quite prostrate (growing ever lower with increasing altitude) and does well in areas with protective winter snow cover to prevent damage from late frosts.

Because of its cold-hardiness, Kathleen Meserve crossed it with Ilex aquifolium (common holly) and produced hybrids dubbed the "blue hollies" and later given the scientific name Ilex × meserveae. Two of these hybrid shrubs, sold as clones, have gained the Royal Horticultural Society's Award of Garden Merit. 'Conapri' (trade name Blue Princess) is female. 'Conablu' (trade name Blue Prince) is male and grows a bit taller than 'Conapri', perhaps 2 m (7 ft) at maturity.
