= Ilex arnhemensis =

Scientific classification
- Kingdom: Plantae
- Clade: Tracheophytes
- Clade: Angiosperms
- Clade: Eudicots
- Clade: Asterids
- Order: Aquifoliales
- Family: Aquifoliaceae
- Genus: Ilex
- Species: I. arnhemensis

Binomial name
- Ilex arnhemensis (F.Muell.) Loes.

Subspecies
- I. arnhemensis subsp. arnhemensis I. arnhemensis subsp. ferdinandi

Species of holly

Ilex arnhemensis is the only species of Ilex (holly) native to Australia. Native to coastal and riverine habitats in the tropical north of Western Australia, the Northern Territory and Queensland, it grows as a tree up to 25 metres high.

This species was first published by Ferdinand von Mueller in 1861, under the name Byronia arnhemensis; and transferred in Ilex in 1890. Vernacular names include northern holly.
