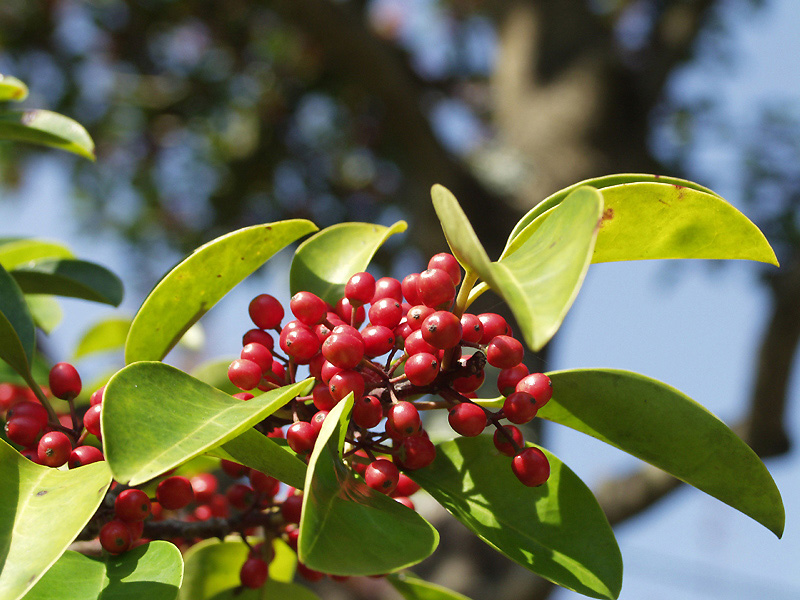

Conservation status
- Least Concern (IUCN 3.1)

Scientific classification
- Kingdom: Plantae
- Clade: Tracheophytes
- Clade: Angiosperms
- Clade: Eudicots
- Clade: Asterids
- Order: Aquifoliales
- Family: Aquifoliaceae
- Genus: Ilex
- Species: I. rotunda

Binomial name
- Ilex rotunda Thunb.

= Ilex rotunda =

Species of holly

Ilex rotunda, commonly called the Kurogane holly, is an evergreen tree in the holly family (Aquifoliaceae). It is native to east Asia, where it is found in China, Japan, Korea, Taiwan, and Vietnam. Its natural habitat is in evergreen broadleaf forests, often in sunny areas such forest edges or on mountain slopes.

It has spineless leathery leaves and clusters of bright-red berries. It reaches 18 m at maturity (although 20 m is also reported). The tree blooms from May to June, and the seeds become ripe from October to December. The plants are dioecious. The fruits contain flavonols.

Kurogane holly was first described in 1784 by Carl Peter Thunberg, from species growing in Japan.

In Japan, it is commonly planted garden and street tree. It was first introduced to gardens of the New World through collections sent by Robert Fortune. In Japan, kurogane holly is one of the hibakujumoku trees. It is also the official tree of several Japanese municipalities.

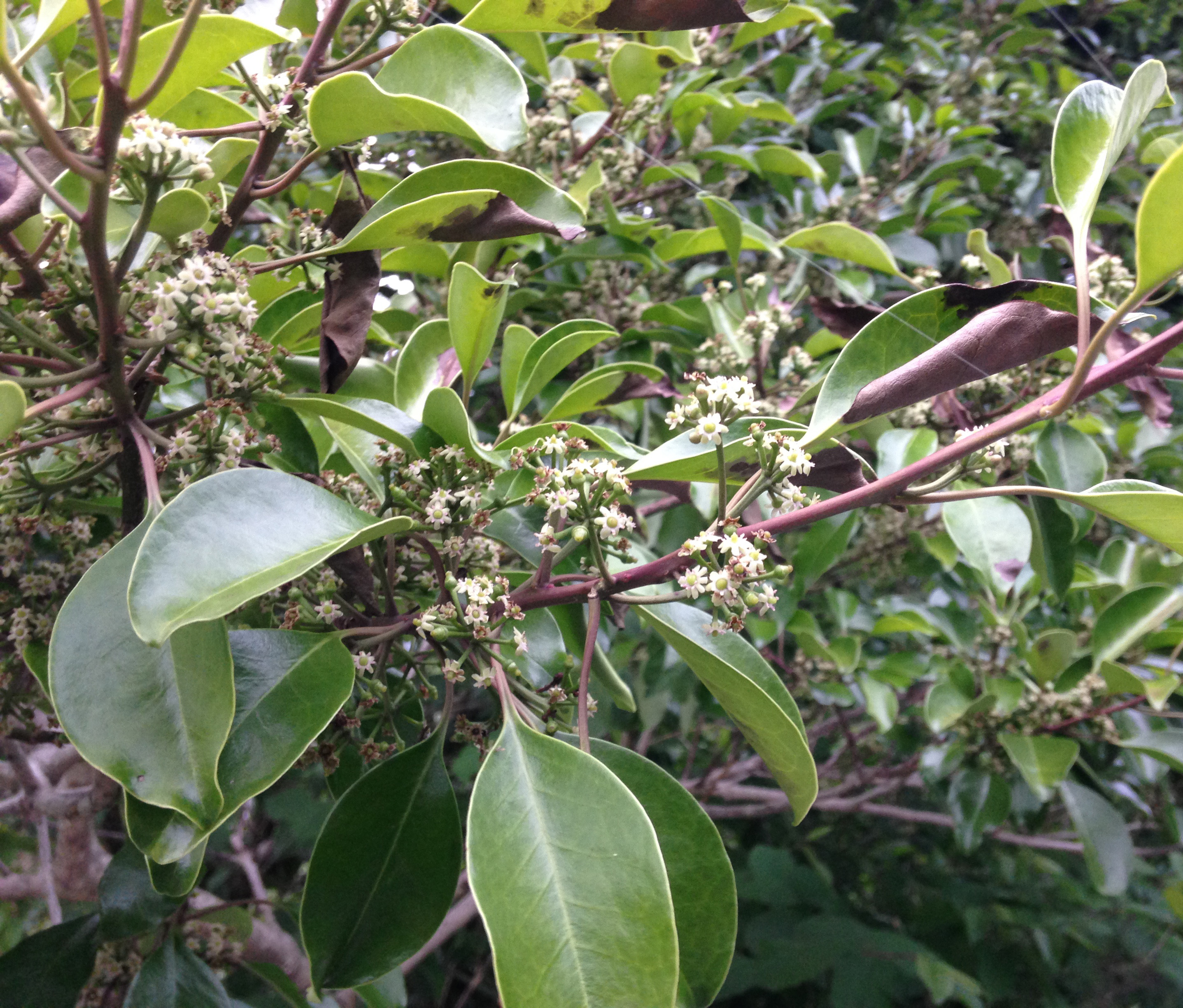
Mature flowers
