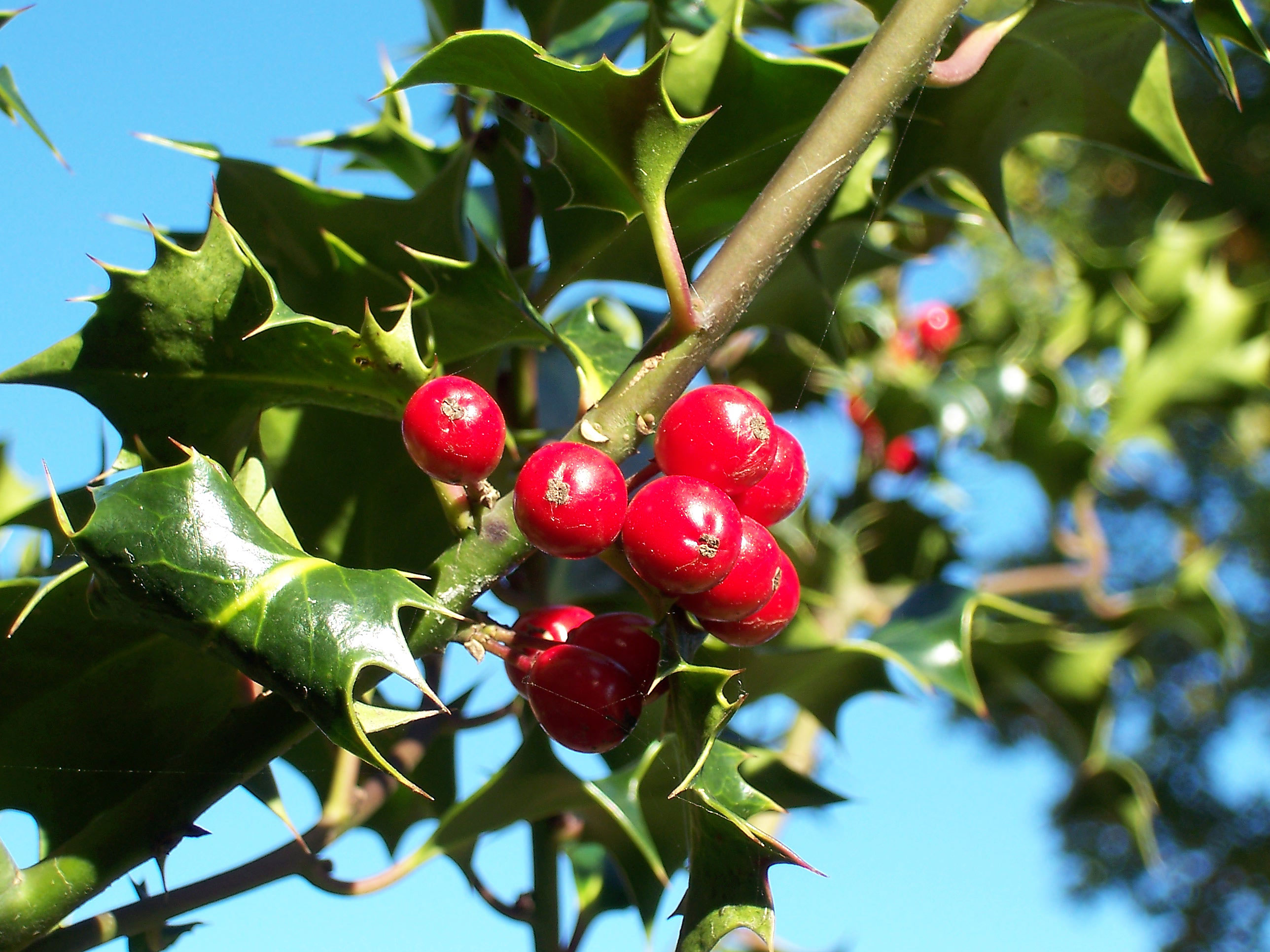
- European holly (Ilex aquifolium) leaves and fruit

Scientific classification
- Kingdom: Plantae
- Clade: Tracheophytes
- Clade: Angiosperms
- Clade: Eudicots
- Clade: Asterids
- Order: Aquifoliales
- Family: Aquifoliaceae; DC. ex A.Rich.
- Genus: Ilex; L.

Type species
- Ilex aquifolium L.

Species
- About 570, see text

= Holly =

Holly Temporal range: Turonian–recent

Genus of flowering plants

Ilex (/ˈaɪlɛks/) or holly is a genus of over 570 species of flowering plants in the family Aquifoliaceae, and the only living genus in that family. Ilex has the most species of any woody dioecious angiosperm genus. The species are evergreen or deciduous trees, shrubs, and climbers from tropics to temperate zones worldwide.

The type species is Ilex aquifolium, the common European holly used in Christmas decorations and cards. Aside, other hollies are desired for other purposes, like yerba mate and yaupon for the beverage made from their leaves.

== Description ==
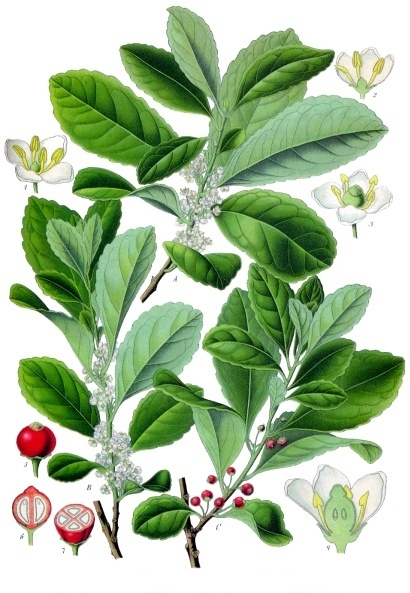
Ilex paraguariensis

The genus is widespread throughout the temperate and subtropical regions of the world. It includes species of trees, shrubs, and climbers, with evergreen or deciduous foliage and inconspicuous flowers. Its range was more extended in the Tertiary period and many species are adapted to laurel forest habitats. It occurs from sea level to more than 2,000 m (6,600 ft) with high mountain species. It is a genus of small, evergreen trees with smooth, glabrous, or pubescent branchlets. The plants are generally slow-growing with some species growing to 25 m (82 ft) tall. The type species is the European holly Ilex aquifolium described by Linnaeus. Plants in this genus have simple, alternate glossy leaves, frequently with a spiny leaf margin.

The inconspicuous flower is greenish white, with four petals. They are generally dioecious, with male and female flowers on different plants. Plants in the genus have highly similar flowers with a flower preserved in amber suggesting they have been largely unchanged for at least 38−34 million years.

=== Fruit ===
The small fruits of Ilex, although often referred to as berries, are technically drupes. They range in color from red to brown to black, and rarely green or yellow. The "bones" contain up to ten seeds each. Some species produce fruits parthenogenetically, such as the cultivar 'Nellie R. Stevens'. The fruits ripen in winter and thus provide winter colour contrast between the bright red of the fruits and the glossy green evergreen leaves. Hence the cut branches, especially of I. aquifolium, are widely used in Christmas decoration.

The fruits are generally slightly toxic to humans, and can cause vomiting and diarrhea when ingested. However, they are a food source for certain birds and other animals, which help disperse the seeds. Unfortunately this can have negative impacts as well. Along the west coast of North America, from California to British Columbia, English holly (Ilex aquifolium), which is grown commercially, is quickly spreading into native forest habitat, where it thrives in shade and crowds out native species. It has been placed on the Washington State Noxious Weed Control Board's monitor list, and is a Class C invasive plant in Portland.

== Etymology ==
The name "holly" is a common name that speficically refers to Ilex aquifolium, specifically stems with berries used in Christmas decoration. By extension, "holly" is also applied to the whole genus. The origin of the word "holly" is considered a reduced form of Old English hole(ġ)n, Middle English Holin, later Hollen. The French word for holly, houx, derives from the Old Low Franconian *hulis (Middle Dutch huls). Both are related to Old High German hulis, huls, as are Low German/Low Franconian terms like Hülse or hulst. These Germanic words appear to be related to words for holly in Celtic languages, such as Welsh celyn, Breton kelen(n) and Irish cuileann.

Ilex in Latin means the holm-oak or evergreen oak (Quercus ilex). Despite the Linnaean classification of Ilex as holly, as late as the 19th century in Britain, the term Ilex was still being applied to the oak as well as the holly – possibly due to the superficial similarity of the leaves.

== History ==
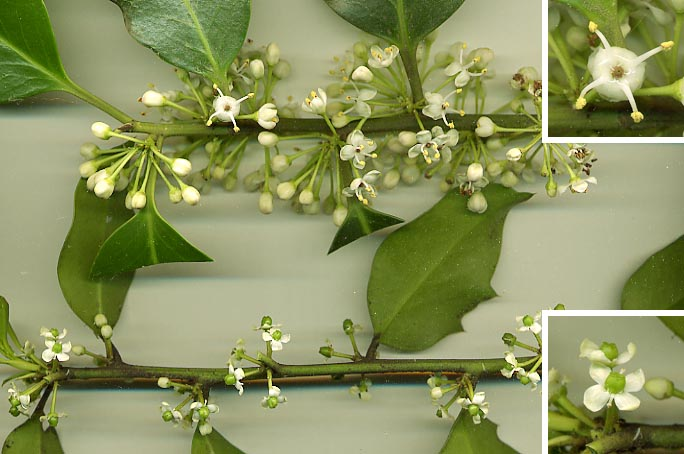
Hollies (here, Ilex aquifolium) are dioecious: (above) shoot with flowers from male plant; (top right) male flower enlarged from female plant; (lower right) female flower enlarged, showing ovary and reduced, sterile stamens with no pollen.

The phylogeography of this group provides examples of various speciation mechanisms at work. In this scenario ancestors of this group became isolated from the remaining Ilex when the Earth mass broke away into Gondwana and Laurasia about 82 million years ago, resulting in a physical separation of the groups and beginning a process of change to adapt to new conditions. This mechanism is called allopatric speciation. Over time, survivor species of the holly genus adapted to different ecological niches. This led to reproductive isolation, an example of ecological speciation. In the Pliocene, around five million years ago, mountain formation diversified the landscape and provided new opportunities for speciation within the genus.

The fossil record indicates that the Ilex lineage was already widespread prior to the end of the Cretaceous period; the earliest records of the distinctive pollen of Ilex are from the Turonian of the Otway Basin of Australia. The earliest fossil holly fruit is known from the Maastrichtian of central Europe. Based on the molecular clock, the common ancestor of most of the extant species probably appeared during the Eocene, about 50 million years ago, suggesting that older representatives of the genus belong to now extinct branches. This common ancestor lived in subtropical East Asia and the present worldwide distribution is the result of later migrations. Ilex sinica seems to be the most basal extant species. The laurel forest covered great areas of the Earth during the Paleogene, when the genus was more prosperous. This type of forest extended during the Neogene, more than 20 million years ago. Most of the last remaining temperate broadleaf evergreen forests are believed to have disappeared about 10,000 years ago at the end of the Pleistocene. Many of the then-existing species with the strictest ecological requirements became extinct because they could not cross the barriers imposed by the geography, but others found refuge as a species relict in coastal enclaves, archipelagos, and coastal mountains sufficiently far from areas of extreme cold and aridity and protected by the oceanic influence.

== Selected species ==
- Ilex ambigua – Southeastern US
- Ilex amelanchier – Southeastern US
- Ilex anomala (Hawaii)
- Ilex aquifolium – European holly, English holly, Christ's thorn (western and southern Europe, northwest Africa, and southwest Asia)
- Ilex canariensis (Macaronesian islands)
- Ilex cassine – dahoon holly, cassena (Virginia to southeast Texas of US, Veracruz of Mexico, Bahamas, Cuba, and Puerto Rico)
- Ilex coriacea – gallberry (Virginia to Texas of United States)
- Ilex cornuta – Chinese holly, horned holly (eastern China and Korea)
- Ilex crenata – Japanese holly, box-leaved holly, inutsuge (Japanese) (eastern China, Japan, Korea, Taiwan, and Sakhalin)
- Ilex decidua Walter – possumhaw (eastern United States, northeastern Mexico)
- Ilex gardneriana (extinct: 20th century?) (India)
- Ilex glabra L. A.Gray – evergreen winterberry, bitter gallberry, inkberry (eastern North America)
- Ilex guayusa (Amazon rainforest)
- Ilex integra – mochi tree, Nepal holly (Korea; Taiwan; the mid-southern regions of China; and Honshu, Shikoku and Kyushu in Japan)
- Ilex kaushue (China)
- Ilex khasiana (India)
- Ilex latifolia – tarajo holly, tarayō (Japanese) (southern Japan and eastern and southern China )
- Ilex mitis (southern Africa)
- Ilex montana Torrey & A.Gray – mountain winterberry (Eastern United States)
- Ilex mucronata (L.) M.Powell, Savol., & S.Andrews – mountain holly, catberry (Eastern North America)
- Ilex opaca – American holly (Eastern United States)
- Ilex paraguariensis – yerba mate (mate, erva-mate)
- Ilex pedunculosa – longstalked holly
- Ilex perado – Macaronesian holly
- Ilex quercetorum (Mexico and Guatemala)
- Ilex rotunda — Kurogane holly (east Asia)
- Ilex rugosa – Tsuru Holly (mountains of Japan, Sakhalin, Khabarovsk Krai and Kuril Islands Siberia)
- Ilex serrata – Japanese winterberry
- Ilex verticillata (L.) A.Gray American winterberry (Eastern North America)
- Ilex vomitoria – yaupon holly (southeastern United States)

== Range ==
The genus is distributed throughout the world's different climates. Most species make their home in the tropics and subtropics, with a worldwide distribution in temperate zones. The greatest diversity of species is found in the Americas and in Southeast Asia.

Ilex mucronata, formerly the type species of Nemopanthus, is native to eastern North America. Nemopanthus was treated as a separate genus with eight species. of the family Aquifoliaceae, now transferred to Ilex on molecular data; it is closely related to Ilex amelanchier.

In Europe the genus is represented by a single species, the classically named holly Ilex aquifolium, and in continental Africa by this species and Ilex mitis. Ilex canariensis, from Macaronesia, and Ilex aquifolium arose from a common ancestor in the laurel forests of the Mediterranean. Australia, isolated at an early period, has Ilex arnhemensis. Of 204 species growing in China, 149 species are endemic. A species which stands out for its economic importance in Spanish-speaking countries and in Brazil is Ilex paraguariensis or Yerba mate. Having evolved numerous species that are endemic to islands and small mountain ranges, and being highly useful plants, many hollies are now becoming rare.

== Ecology ==
Often the tropical species are especially threatened by habitat destruction and overexploitation. At least two species of Ilex have become extinct recently, and many others are barely surviving.

They are an extremely important food for numerous species of birds, and also are eaten by other wild animals. In the autumn and early winter the fruits are hard and apparently unpalatable. After being frozen or frosted several times, the fruits soften, and become milder in taste. During winter storms, birds often take refuge in hollies, which provide shelter, protection from predators (by the spiny leaves), and food. The flowers are sometimes eaten by the larva of the double-striped pug moth (Gymnoscelis rufifasciata). Other Lepidoptera whose larvae feed on holly include Bucculatrix ilecella, which feeds exclusively on hollies, and the engrailed (Ectropis crepuscularia).

== Toxicity ==
Holly can contain caffeic acid, caffeoyl derivatives, chlorogenic acid, quercetin, quinic acid, kaempferol, tannins, rutin, caffeine, theobromine, and ilicin.

Holly berries can cause vomiting and diarrhea. They are especially dangerous in cases involving accidental consumption by children attracted to the bright red berries. Ingestion of over 20 berries may be fatal to children.

Holly leaves, if eaten, might cause diarrhea, nausea, vomiting, and stomach and intestinal problems.

Holly plants might be toxic to pets and livestock.

== Uses ==
=== Culinary use ===
Leaves of some holly species are used by some cultures to make daily tea. These species are Yerba mate (I. paraguariensis), Ilex guayusa, Kuding (Ilex kaushue), Yaupon (I. vomitoria) and others. Leaves of other species, such as gallberry (I. glabra) are bitter and emetic. In general little is known about inter-species variation in constituents or toxicity of hollies.

Holly berries are fermented and distilled to produce an eau de vie.

=== Ornamental use ===
Many of the holly species are widely used as ornamental plants in temperate/European gardens and parks, notably:

- I. aquifolium (common European holly)
- I. crenata (box-leaved holly)
- I. verticillata (winterberry)

Hollies are often used for hedges; the spiny leaves make them difficult to penetrate, and they take well to pruning and shaping. Many hundreds of hybrids and cultivars have been developed for garden use, among them the very popular "Highclere holly", Ilex × altaclerensis (I. aquifolium × I. perado) and the "blue holly", Ilex × meserveae (I. aquifolium × I. rugosa). The cultivars I. × meserveae Blue Prince = 'Conablu' and Blue Princess = 'Conapri' have gained the Royal Horticultural Society's Award of Garden Merit. Another hybrid is Ilex × koehneana, with the cultivar 'Chestnut Leaf'.

=== Culture ===
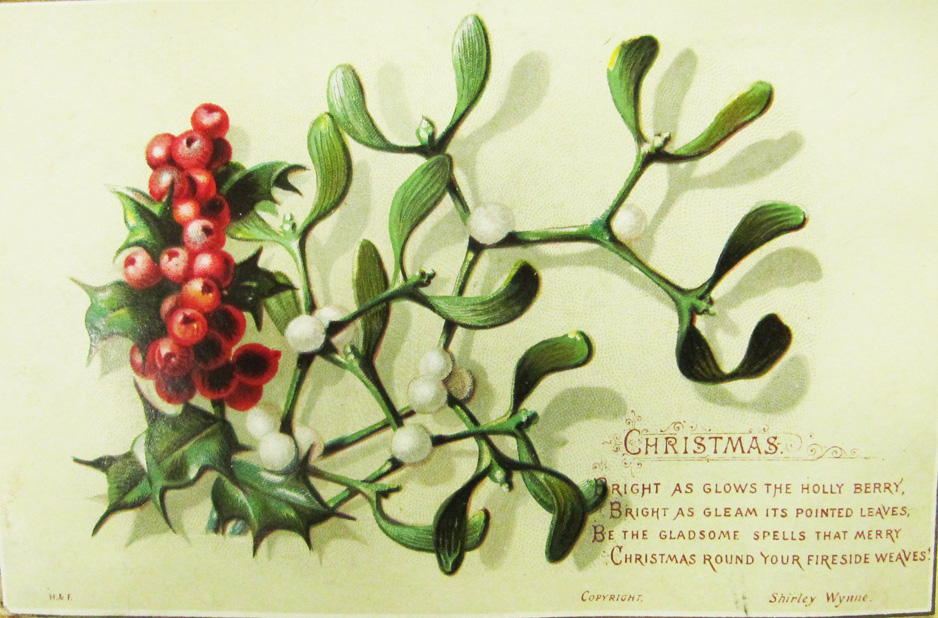
Traditional Christmas card with holly and mistletoe, circa 1880s

Holly – specifically the European holly, Ilex aquifolium – is commonly referenced at Christmas time, and is often referred to by the name Christ's thorn. In many Western Christian cultures, holly is used as a traditional Christmas decoration, used especially in wreaths and illustrations, for instance on Christmas cards. Since medieval times the plant has carried a Christian symbolism, as expressed in the traditional Christmas carol "The Holly and the Ivy", in which the holly represents Jesus and the ivy represents the Virgin Mary. Angie Mostellar discusses the Christian use of holly at Christmas, stating that:

Christians have identified a wealth of symbolism in its form. The sharpness of the leaves help to recall the crown of thorns worn by Jesus; the red berries serve as a reminder of the drops of blood that were shed for salvation; and the shape of the leaves, which resemble flames, can serve to reveal God's burning love for His people. Combined with the fact that holly maintains its bright colors during the Christmas season, it naturally came to be associated with the Christian holiday.

Coat of arms of Stord, Norway

In heraldry, holly is used to symbolize truth. Stord Municipality in Norway has a yellow twig of holly in its coat of arms.

The Druids held that "leaves of holly offered protection against evil spirits" and thus "wore holly in their hair".

In some traditions of Wicca, the Holly King is one of the faces of the Sun God. He is born at midsummer and rules from Mabon to Ostara.

In the Irish language, the words mac cuilinn mean 'son of holly'. Common anglicized forms of this arose; last names such as McCullen, McCullion, McQuillan, and MacCullion, which are quite common surnames in some areas.

=== Medicinal use ===
Gan Mao Ling (simplified Chinese: 感冒灵; traditional Chinese: 感冒靈) is a Chinese herbal medication alleged to be effective in the early stages of cold or flu, and one main ingredient is the root of the Ilex. It’s a commonly used and widely known medication in Traditional Chinese Medicine. The ingredients of the remedy are: Ilex root, Gang Mei Gen Euodia leaf, San Cha Ku Chrysanthemum flower, Ju Hua Vitex herb, Huang Jing Cao Isatis root, Ban Lan Gen Lonicera flower, Jin Yin Hua

== Gallery ==
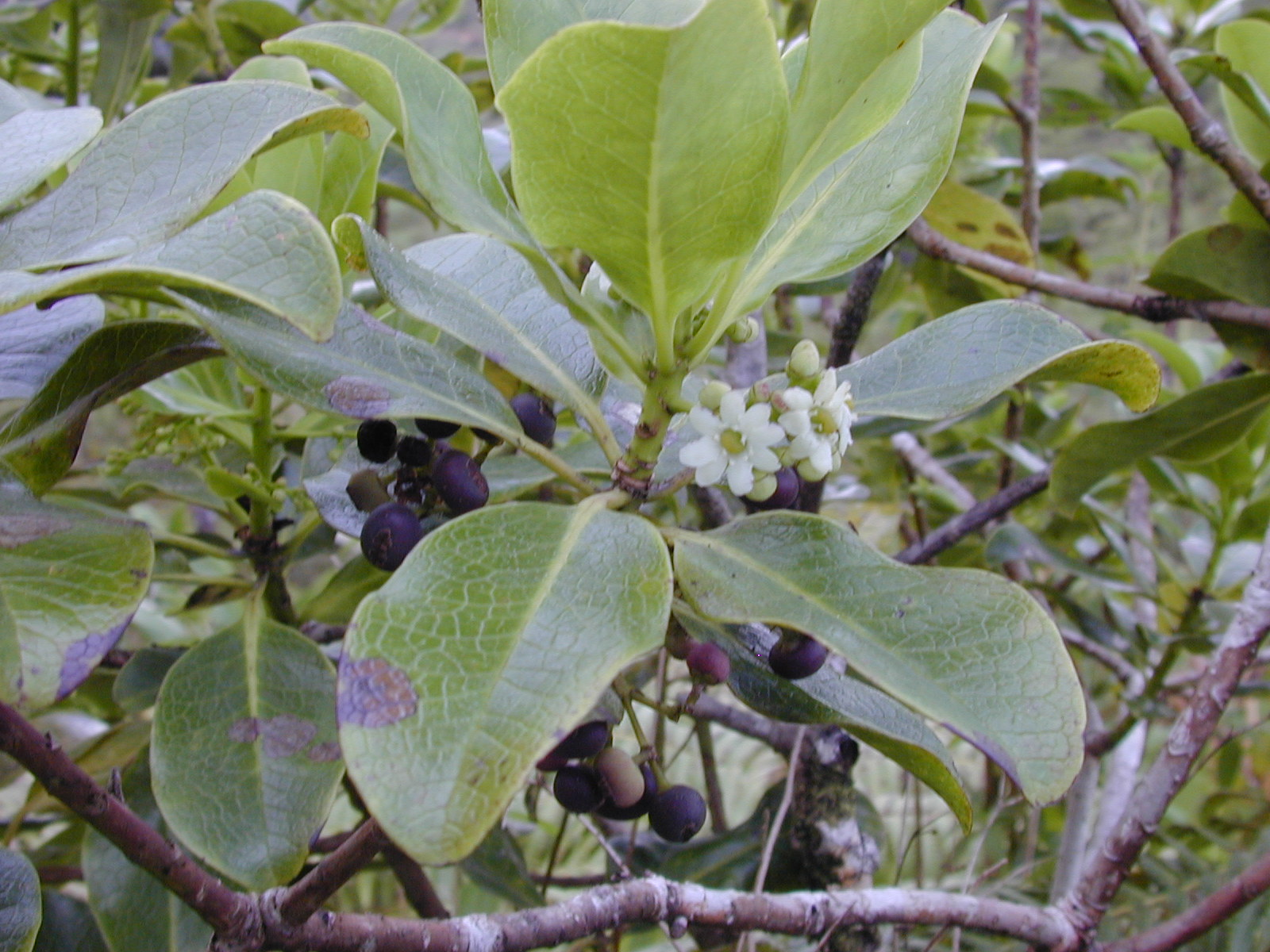
Ilex anomala

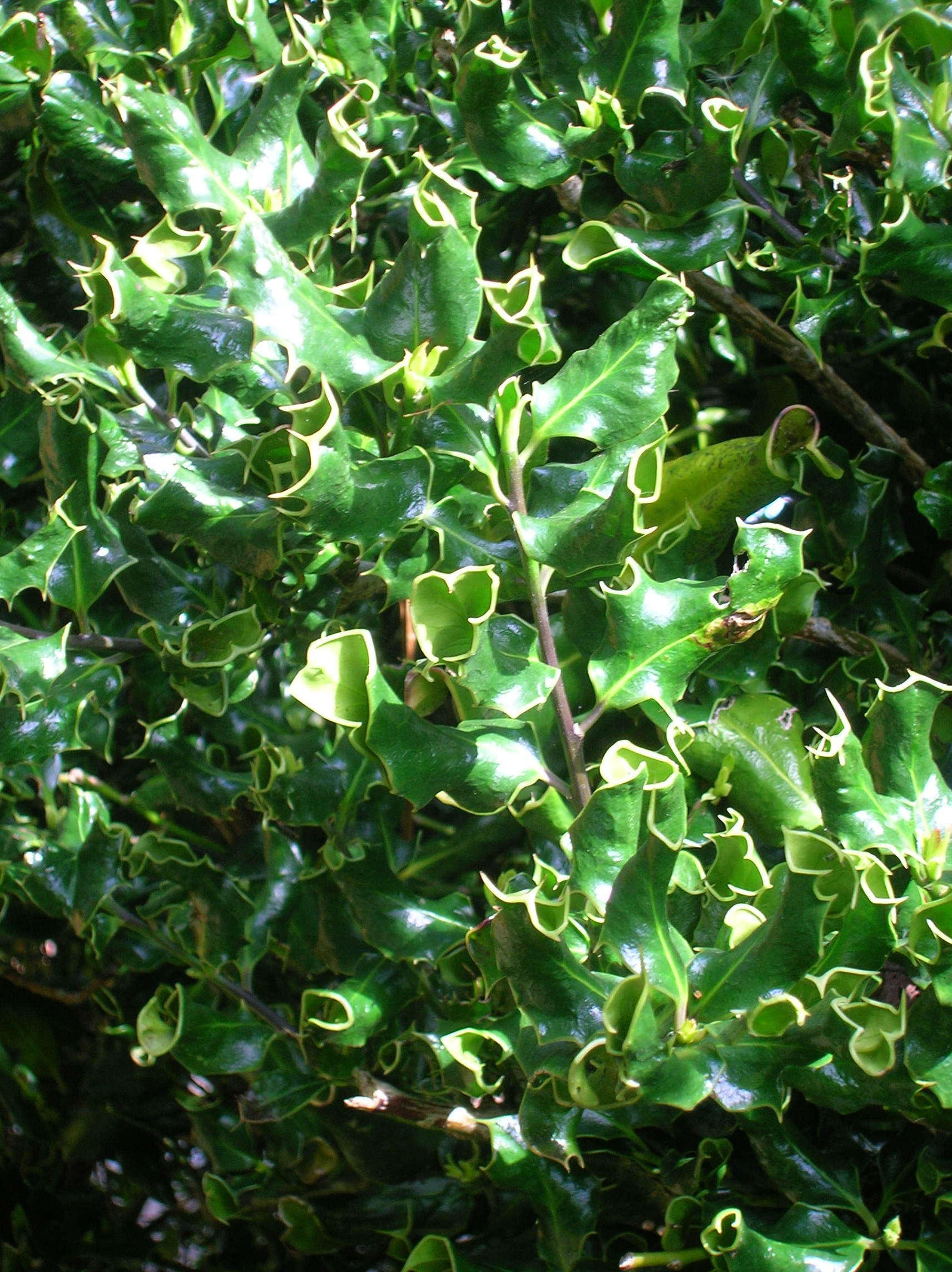
A contorted hedgehog holly Ilex aquifolium 'Ferox'

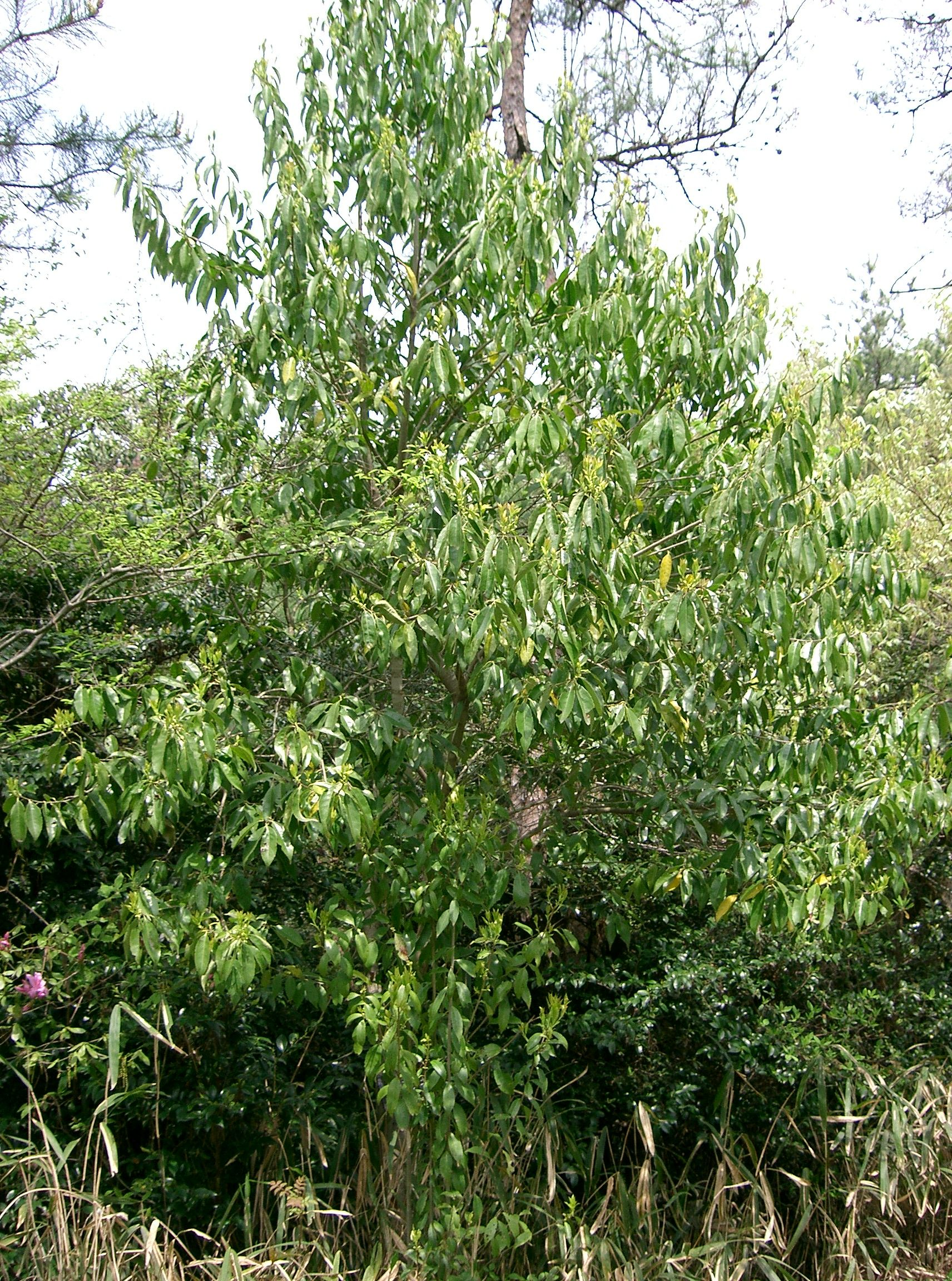
Ilex chinensis

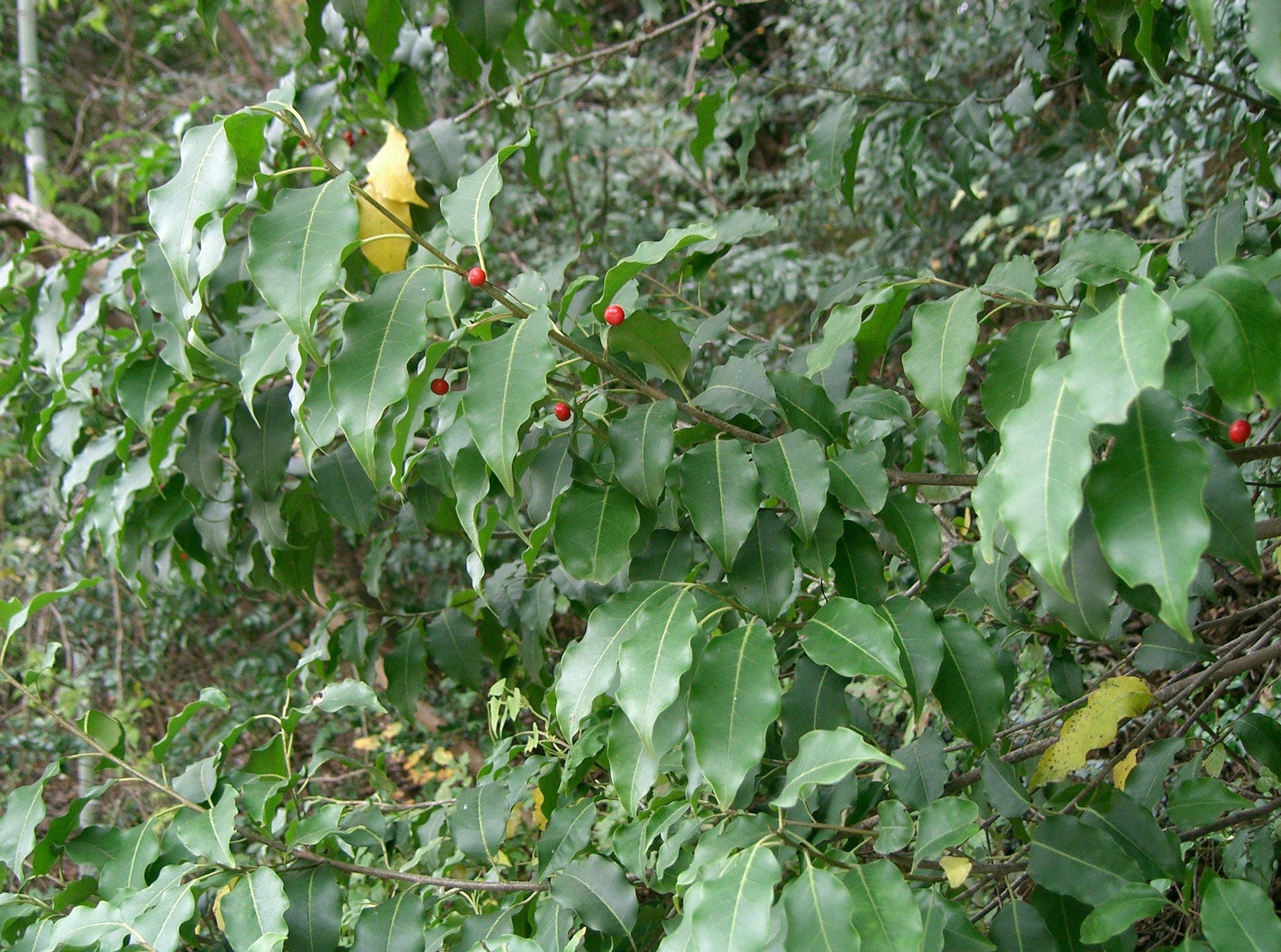
Ilex pedunculosa

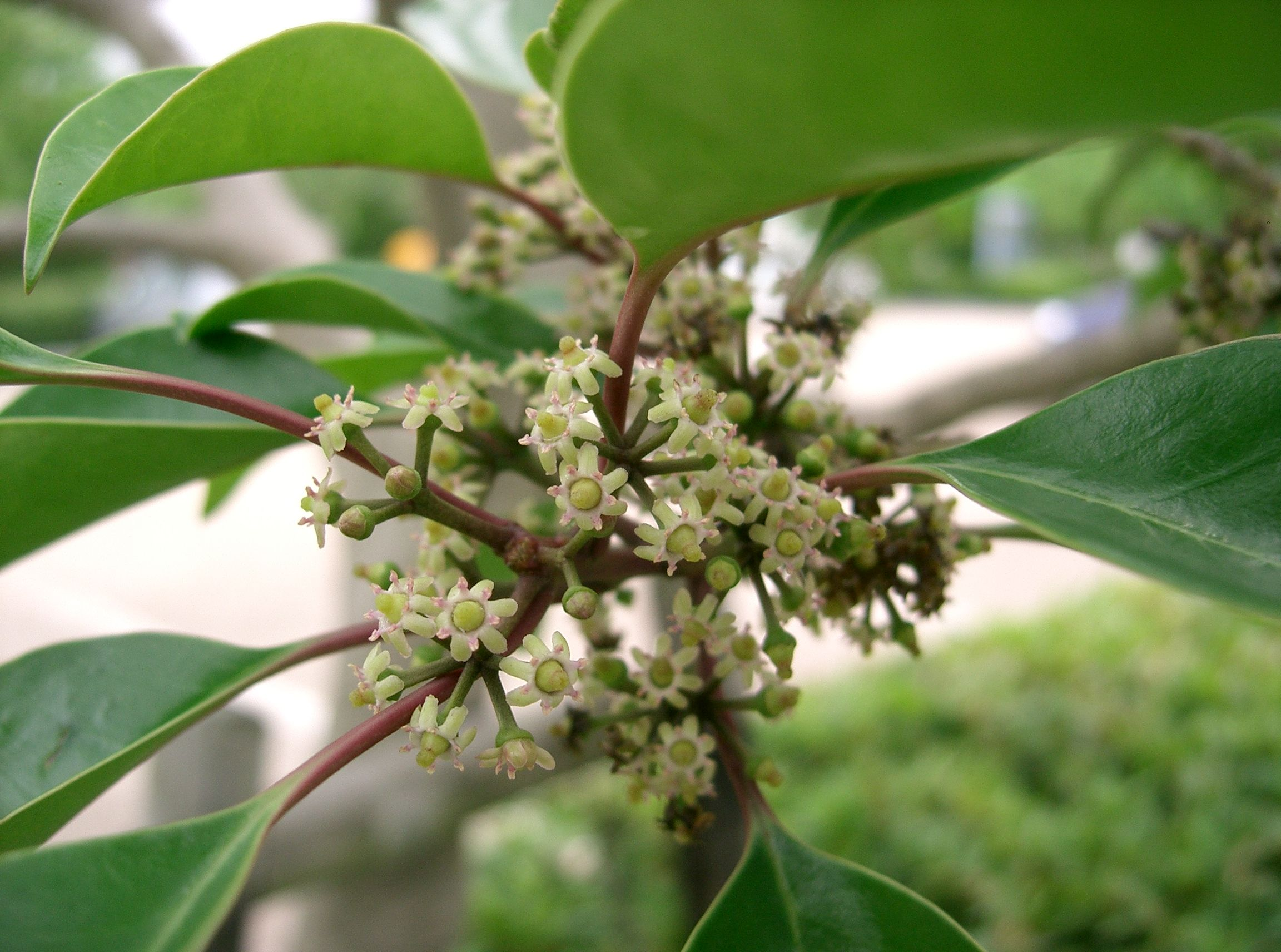
Ilex rotunda

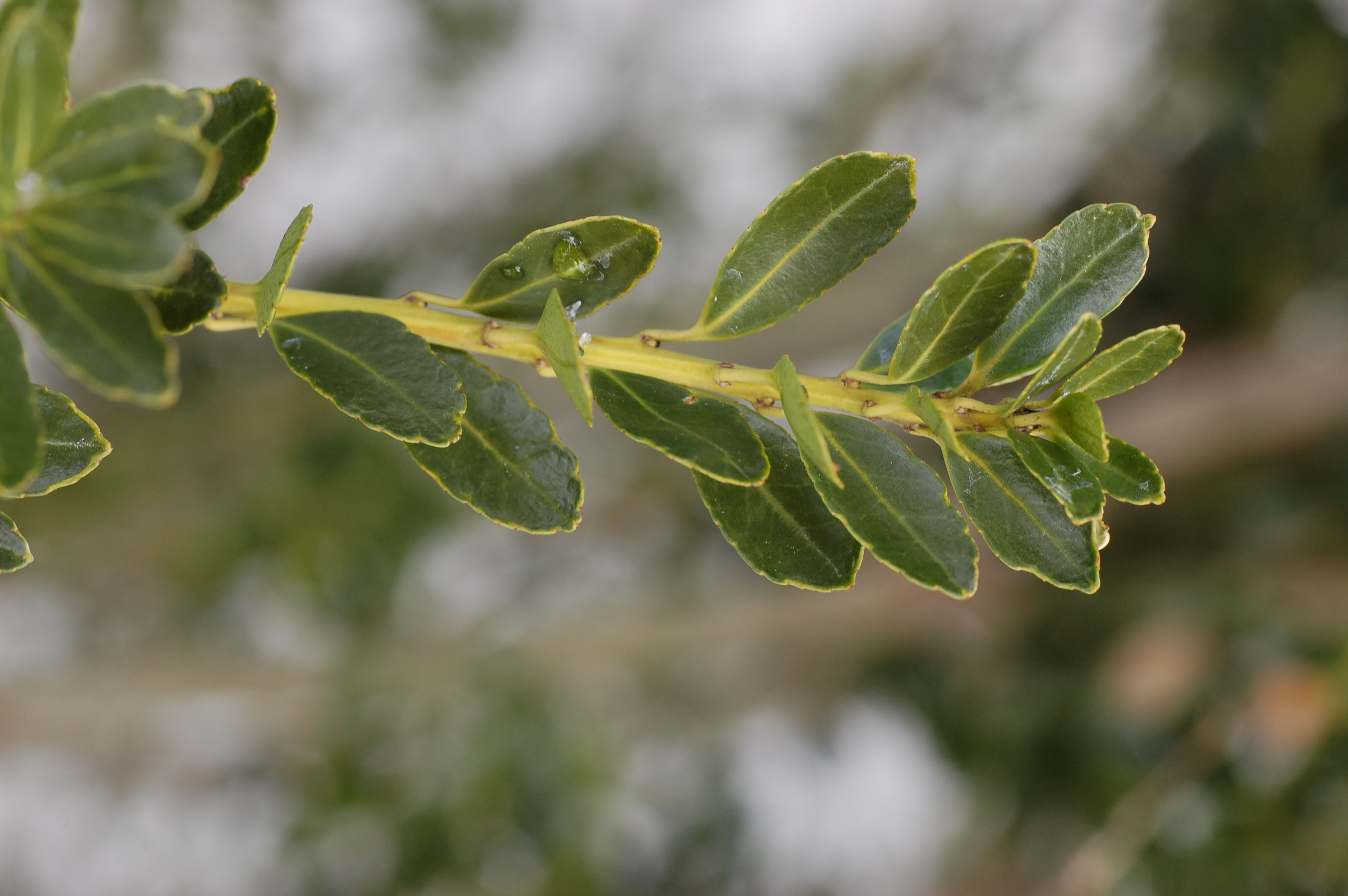
Ilex yunnanensis

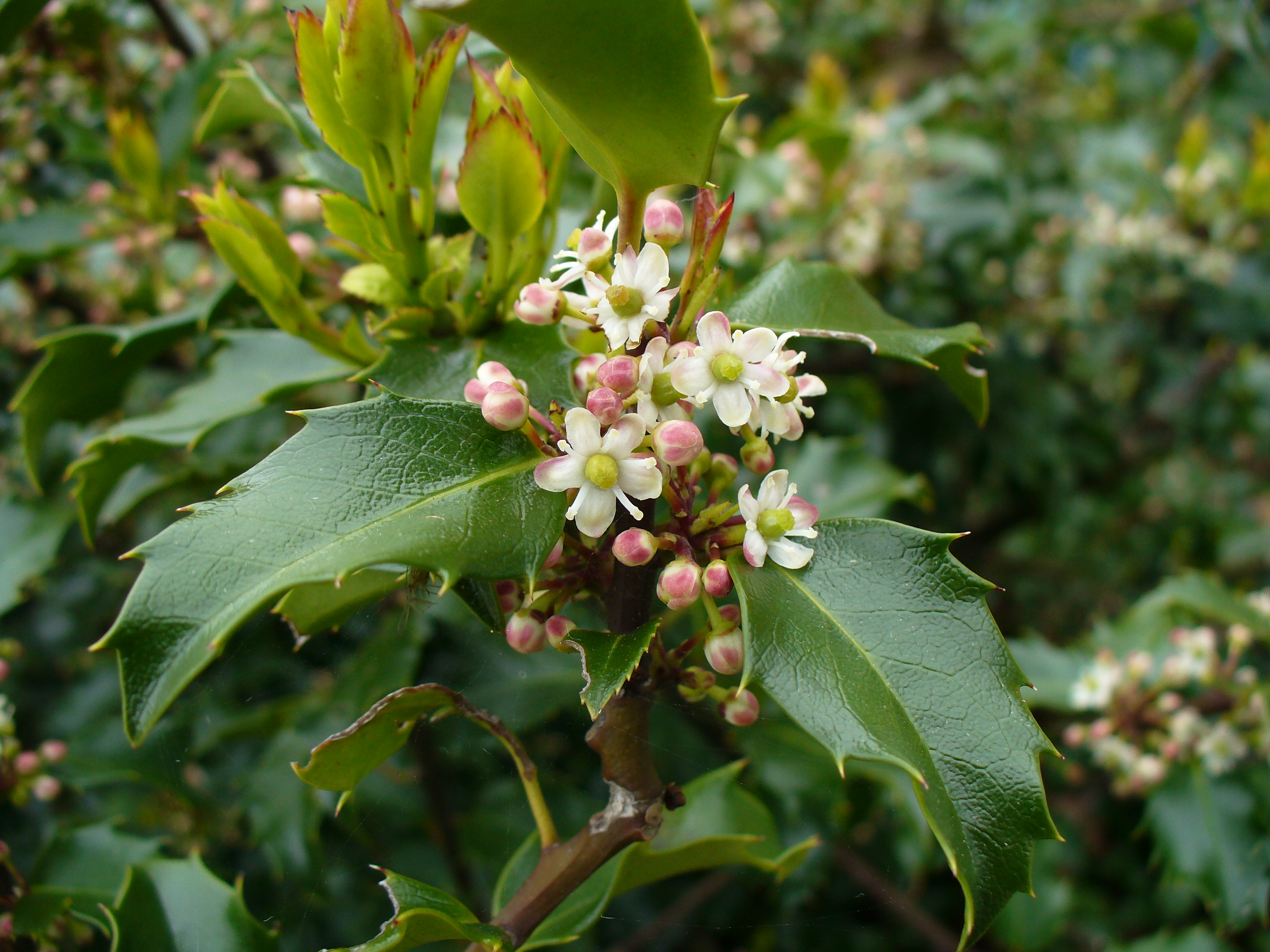
Ilex × meserveae

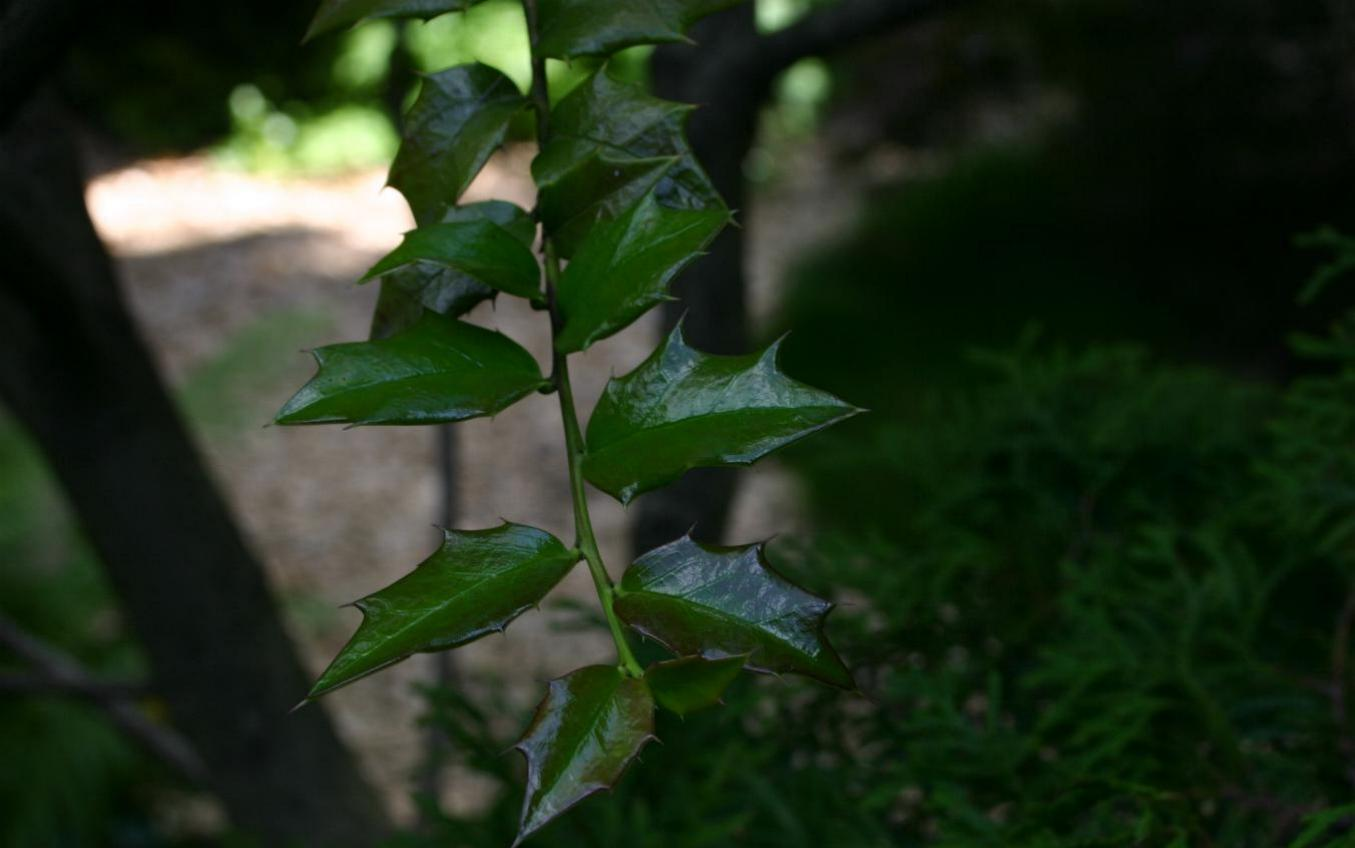
Ilex pernyi from west China
