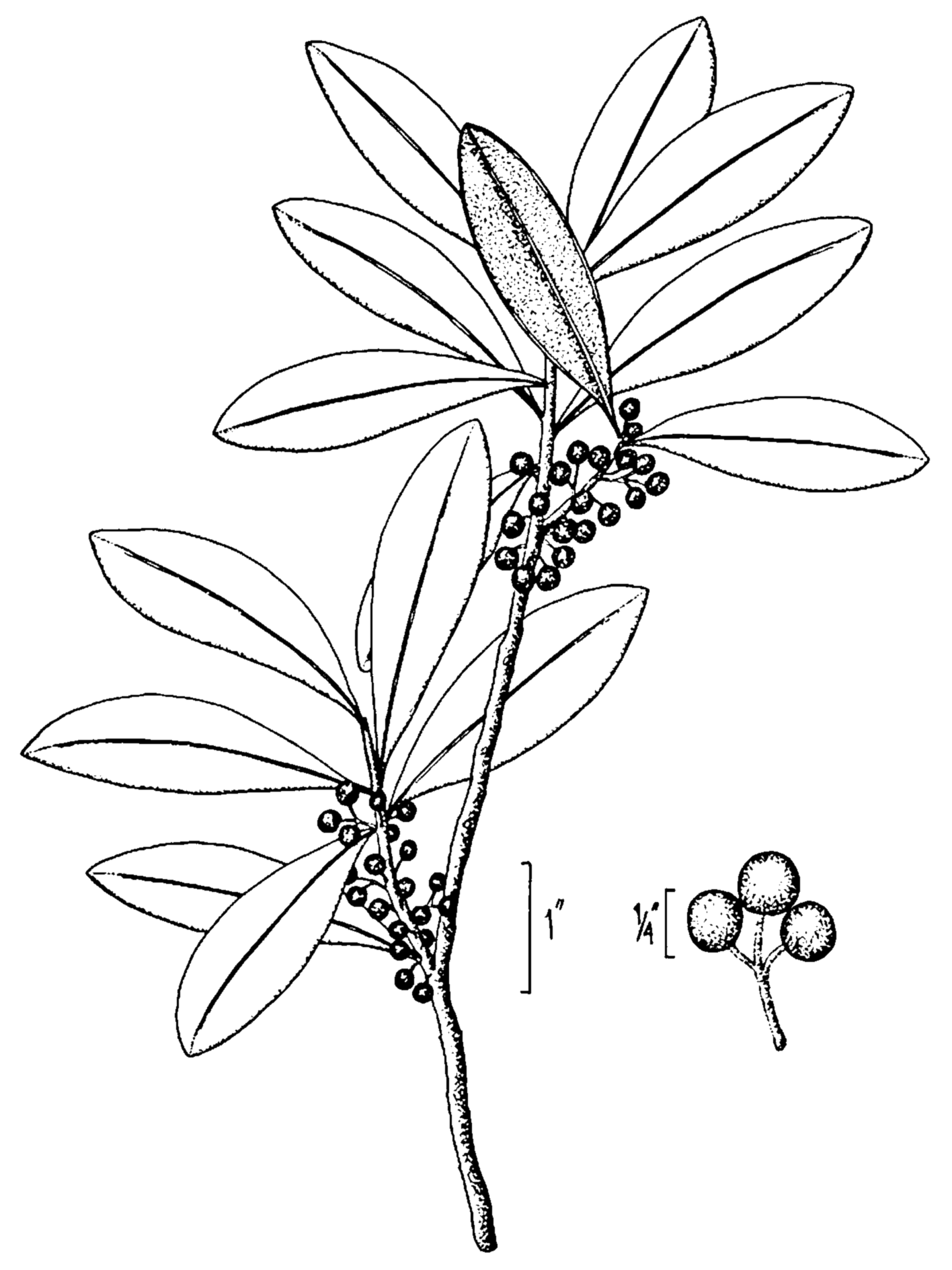
- 1989 illustration

Conservation status
- Least Concern (IUCN 3.1)

Scientific classification
- Kingdom: Plantae
- Clade: Embryophytes
- Clade: Tracheophytes
- Clade: Spermatophytes
- Clade: Angiosperms
- Clade: Eudicots
- Clade: Asterids
- Order: Aquifoliales
- Family: Aquifoliaceae
- Genus: Ilex
- Species: I. amelanchier

Binomial name
- Ilex amelanchier M.A.Curtis ex Chapm.
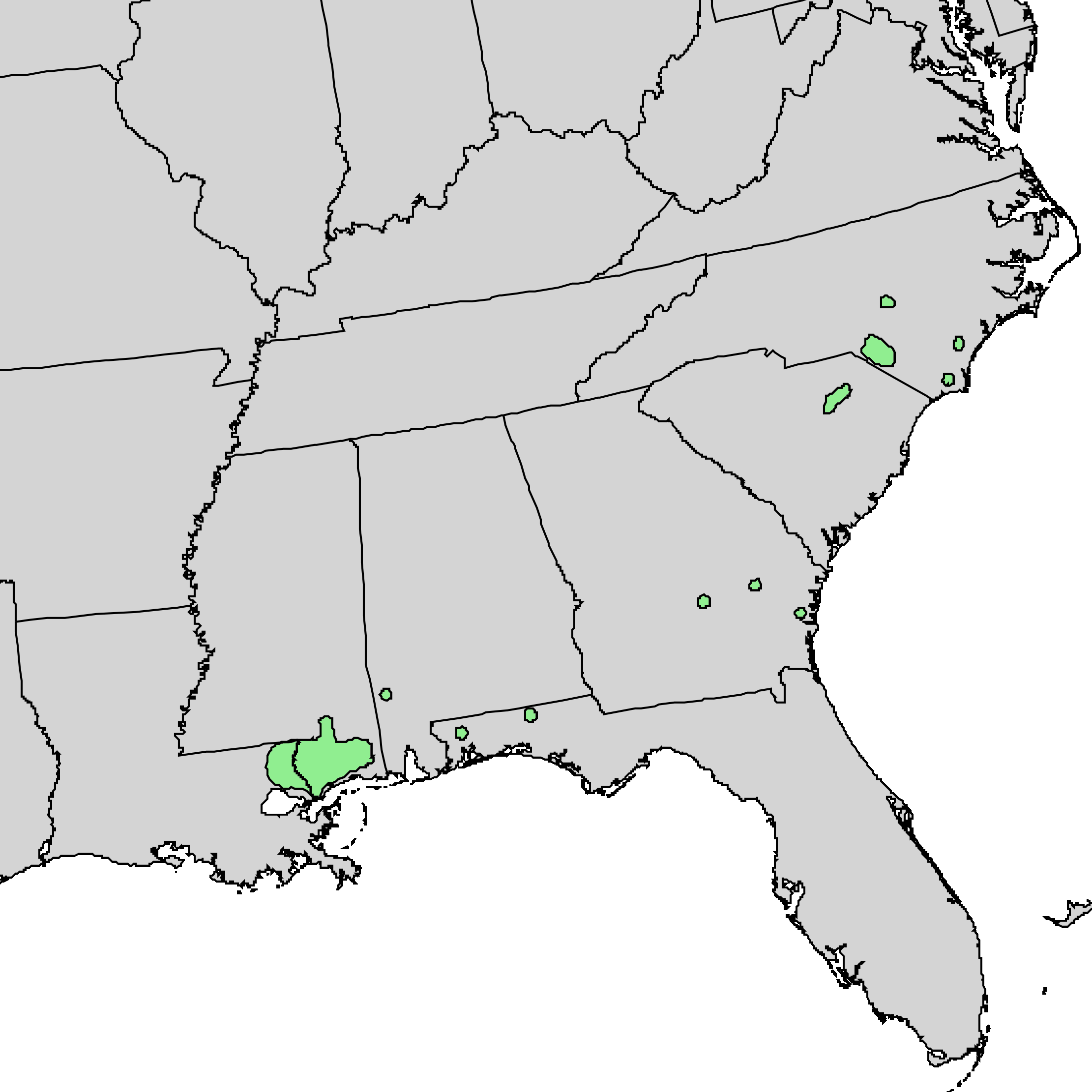
- Natural range of Ilex amelanchier

Synonyms
- Ilex dubia (G.Don) Britton, Sterns & Poggenb. (1883), non C.O.Weber (1851), fossil name; Ilex verticillata var. dubius DC.; Prinos dubius G.Don

= Ilex amelanchier =

Swamp holly

Species of holly

Ilex amelanchier, the swamp holly or sarvis holly, is a rare species of holly from the southeastern United States. It is a close relative of mountain holly (Ilex mucronata) which used to be placed in a monotypic genus Nemopanthus. Ilex amelanchier grows near water, for example on streambanks.

The dull red drupes appear in October to November, and may persist until the following spring.

Its native range is limited to the Atlantic Plain and Gulf Coastal Plain, and extends as far south as Florida, as far west as Louisiana, and as far north as North Carolina.
