= Ilex ambigua =

Conservation status
- Least Concern (IUCN 3.1)

Scientific classification
- Kingdom: Plantae
- Clade: Tracheophytes
- Clade: Angiosperms
- Clade: Eudicots
- Clade: Asterids
- Order: Aquifoliales
- Family: Aquifoliaceae
- Genus: Ilex
- Species: I. ambigua

Binomial name
- Ilex ambigua (Michx.) Torr. 1843 not Chapm. 1860
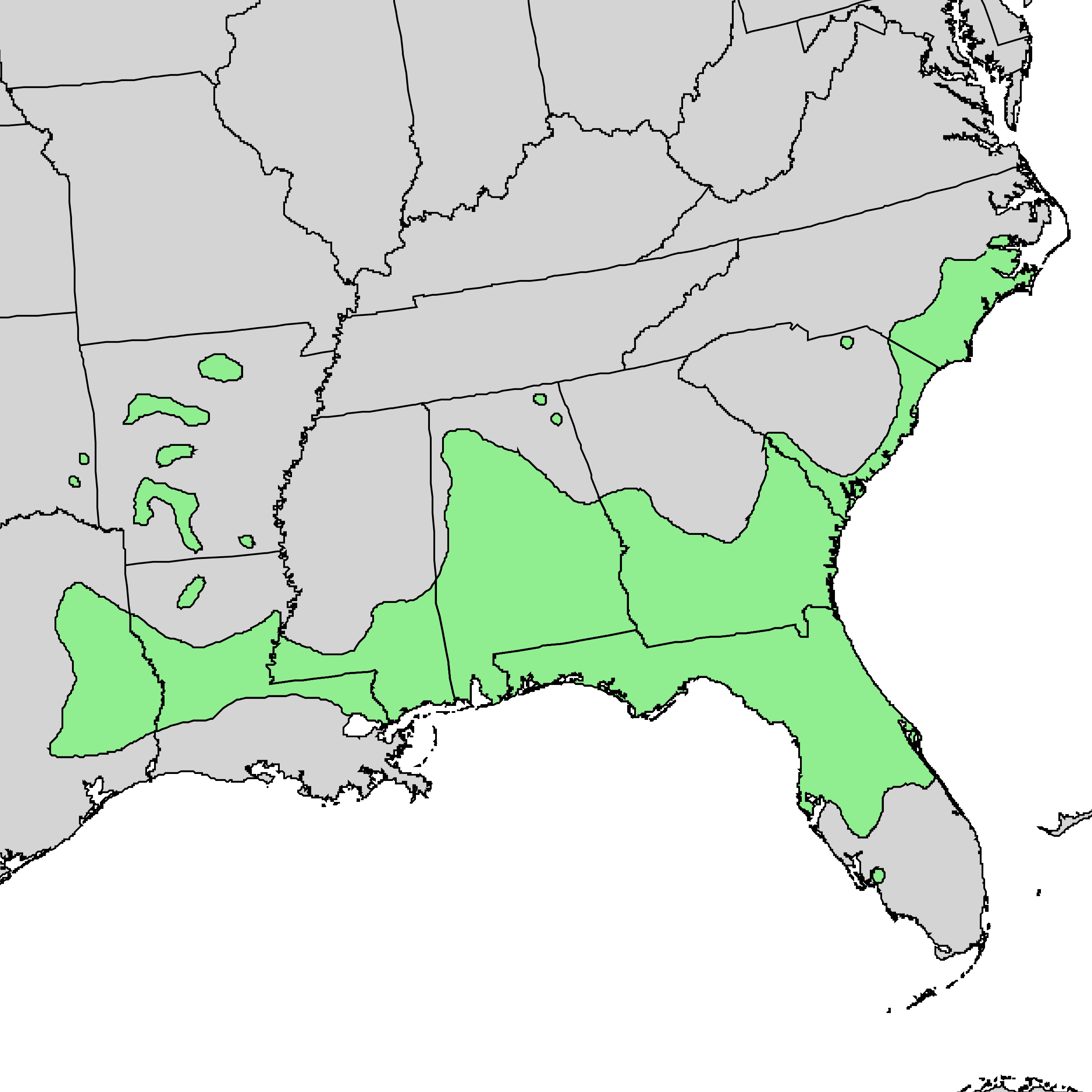
- Natural range of Ilex ambigua

Synonyms
- Ilex mollis A.Gray, syn of f. mollis; Ilex monticola A.Gray 1856 not Tul. 1857, syn of var. monticola

Species of holly

Ilex ambigua is a species of flowering plant in the holly family known by the common names Carolina holly and sand holly. It is native to the southeastern and south-central United States, along the coastal plain from North Carolina to Texas, inland as far as Oklahoma, Arkansas, and Tennessee.

== Description ==
Ilex ambigua is a large shrub or small tree up to 6 metres (20 ft) tall. The branches are covered in shiny dark brown or black bark which becomes flaky with age. The twigs are purple. Some branches have a thick coat of fine hairs. The leaves are up to 18 centimeters (7.2 inches) long by 7 cm (2.8 inches) wide. The leaf margins are partially or entirely toothed or wavy.

The species is dioecious, with male and female reproductive parts occurring on separate individuals. The fruit is a spherical red drupe. The seeds are dispersed by animals, which eat the fruits.

Habitat

Ilex ambigua, grows in many types of sandy habitat, such as sand scrub and hammocks and hardwood forests and woodlands. It may grow with pines such as loblolly, slash, and shortleaf pine, and oak species. It sometimes grows with its relative, American holly.

forms and varieties

- Ilex ambigua f. ambigua
- Ilex ambigua var. ambigua
- Ilex ambigua f. mollis (A. Gray) H.E. Ahles
- Ilex ambigua var. monticola (A. Gray) Wunderlin & Poppleton
