= Paleoflora of the Messel Formation =

This is an overview of the paleoflora of the Eocene Messel Formation as explored by the Messel Pit excavations in Germany. A former quarry and now UNESCO World Heritage Site, the Messel Formation preserves what lived in and around a meromictic lake surrounded by a paratropical rainforest during the latest early to earliest middle Eocene, approximately 47 Ma. A complete list of plant taxa was published in 2024.

Several major monographs on the paleoflora have been published since the early 1900s, with Hermann Engelhardt producing the first leaf monograph in 1922, followed by Heidemarie Thiele-Pfeiffer in 1988 who provided the first in-depth palynological revision and expansion. Margaret Collinson, Steven Manchester, and Volker Wilde collaborated to study and redescribe the flowers, fruits, seeds, and other reproductive organs of the formation, with the monograph being published in 2011. Most recently, Johannes Bouchal, Christian Geier, Friđgeir Grímsson and colleagues have completed monographic studies of the palynomorphs, combining traditional light microscopy with scanning electron microscopy to achieve greater phylogenetic precision.

== Dinoflagellates ==
Only a single dinoflagellate taxon has been described formally from the Messel formation. Based on the predominance in layers where heavy nearshore runoff or slippage is present, its suggested Messelodinium thielepfeifferae was likely an inhabitant of warm nearshore waters in the adult stage or wind and wave action resulted in large accumulation of the cysts. M. thielepfeifferae populations are most prevalent in the older layers of the lake, when it was suggested to be holomictic and become absent in the youngest layers when green algae become dominant with the lake shifting to meromictic conditions and the water chemistry changed.

Family	Genus	Species	Authority	Notes	Image
Peridiniaceae	†Messelodinium	†Messelodinium thielepfeifferae	Lenz et al., 2007	A peridinialean dinoflagellate.	

== Charophyta ==
Olaf Lenz et al (2011) briefly noted the presence of the Zygnemataceae fossil genus Ovoidites, but only gave general population densities with no enumeration on species information.

Family	Genus	Species	Authority	Notes	Image
Zygnemataceae	†Ovoidites	Undescribed		A minor Charophyte green algae component of the Messel Formation.	

== Chlorophyta ==
Several chlorophyte green algae are identified from the Messel Formation, with the greatest concentrations being found in the youngest layers. In the older layers Tetraedron minimum is a distinct component of the yearly varves in the lake, with large blooms occurring to form the lighter summer portions of the varve couplets. In the younger layers, Botryococcus species become the most prolific, having taken over as a major phytoplankton taxon from T. minimum and the dinoflagellate Messelodinium thielepfeifferae.

Family	Genus	Species	Authority	Notes	Image
Botryococcaceae	Botryococcus	Botryococcus braunii	Kützing	A chlorophyte green algae.	
Peridiniaceae	Tetraedron	Tetraedron minimum	(A. Braun) Hansgirg	A chlorophyte green algae The main component in the spring/summer layers of the Messel varves.	

== Pteridophytes ==
Family	Genus	Species	Authority	Notes	Image
Aspleniaceae	Asplenium	Asplenium sp.		Fern pinnules attributed to Asplenium; Not identified to species	

== Conifers ==
Family	Genus	Species	Authority	Notes	Image
Doliostrobaceae	†Doliostrobus	†Doliostrobus taxiformis	(Sternberg) Z. Kvaček emend. Kunzmann	A conifer of possible cupressaceous affinities	
Podocarpaceae	†Podozamites	†Podozamites eocaenica	Engelhardt	Possible podocarpaceous foliage First suggested as a cyacad species	
Taxaceae	Cephalotaxus	†Cephalotaxus messelensis	Wilde	A plum yew species	

== Basal angiosperms ==
=== Nymphaeales ===
Family	Genus	Species	Authority	Notes	Image
Nymphaeaceae	†Nuphaea	†Nuphaea engelhardtii	Gee & Taylor, 2018	A transitional nymphaealean water lily genus	
Incertae sedis	Incertae sedis	Incertae sedis		Seeds of possible nymphaealean affinity Not identified to species	

== Magnoliids ==
=== Laurales ===
Family	Genus	Species	Authority	Notes	Image
Lauraceae	†Laurocarpum	†Laurocarpum sp.		Seeds of lauraceous affinity 3 unnamed morphospecies	
Lauraceae	†Laurophyllum	†Laurophyllum lanigeroides	(Engelhardt) Wilde	A lauraceous leaf morphotaxon host to two forms of asphondyliine tribe midge galls	
Lauraceae	incertae sedis	incertae sedis		Seeds of lauraceous affinity not identified to genus/species	

=== Magnoliales ===
Family	Genus	Species	Authority	Notes	Image
Magnoliaceae	Magnolia	Magnolia sp.		A Magnolia species fruit Not identified to species	
Magnoliaceae	Magnolia	Magnolia sp.		Magnolia species seeds not identified to species	
Myristicaceae	†Myristicacarpum	Myristicacarpum sp.		A Myristicacarpum species seed Not identified to species	

== Monocots ==
=== Alismatales ===
Family	Genus	Species	Authority	Notes	Image
Araceae	†Araciphyllites	†Araciphyllites tertiarius	(Engelhardt) Wilde, Z. Kvaček & Bogner, 2005	An araceous leaf	
Araceae	†Araciphyllites	†Araciphyllites schaarschmidtii	Wilde, Z. Kvaček & Bogner, 2005	An araceous leaf	
Araceae	†Caladiosoma	†Caladiosoma messelense	Wilde, Z. Kvaček & Bogner, 2005	An araceous leaf	

=== Arecales ===
Family	Genus	Species	Authority	Notes	Image
Arecaceae	Arecocaryon	Arecocaryon messelensis	(Collinson, Manchester, & Wilde) Doweld	Palm species fruits First described as Friedemannia messelensis, a genus jr homonym Moved to Arecocaryon messelensis in 2021; The most abundant fruit at Messel known from a full flower to mature fruit ontogenetic series	
Arecaceae	†Calamopsis	Cf. †Calamopsis bredana		A Palm leaf Possibly affiliated with C. bredana	
Arecaceae	Incertae sedis	incertae sedis		Pinnate palm leaves of possible lepidocaryoid tribal affinity. Not identified to species	
Arecaceae	Incertae sedis	incertae sedis		Palmate palm leaves of uncertain tribal affinity. Not identified to species	

=== Liliales ===
Family	Genus	Species	Authority	Notes	Image
Smilacaceae	Smilax	†Smilax grandifolia	Unger	A greenbrier	
Smilacaceae	Smilax	†Smilax lingulata	Heer	A greenbrier	
Smilacaceae	Smilax	†Smilax ovata	Wess.	A greenbrier	
Smilacaceae	Smilax	†Smilax reticulata	Heer	A greenbrier	

=== Pandanales ===
Family	Genus	Species	Authority	Notes	Image
Cyclanthaceae	Cyclanthus	Cyclanthus messelensis	S. Y. Smith, Collinson & Rudall, 2008	A Cyclanthus species Described from fruits and seeds	

=== Poales ===
Family	Genus	Species	Authority	Notes	Image
Cyperaceae	†Volkeria	†Volkeria messelensis	Smith et al., 2009	A mapanioid sedge	
Poaceae	Phragmites	†Phragmites oeningensis	A.Braun ex Heer	A grass foliage	

== Basal eudicots ==
=== Proteales ===
Family	Genus	Species	Authority	Notes	Image
Sabiaceae	Meliosma	Meliosma sp.		A Meliosma species seed Not identified to species	

=== Ranunculales ===
Family	Genus	Species	Authority	Notes	Image
Menispermaceae	Cocculus	†Cocculus lottii	Collinson, Manchester, & Wilde, 2012	A Cocculus species endocarp	
Menispermaceae	Diploclisia	†Diploclisia rugulosa	Collinson, Manchester, & Wilde, 2012	A Diploclisia species seed	
Menispermaceae	†Karinschmidtia	†Karinschmidtia rotulae	Collinson, Manchester, & Wilde, 2012	A menispermaceous endocarp	
Menispermaceae	†Martinmuellera	†Martinmuellera tuberculata	Collinson, Manchester, & Wilde, 2012	A menispermaceous genus seed	
Menispermaceae	†Palaeosinomenium	†Palaeosinomenium ornamentum	Collinson, Manchester, & Wilde, 2012	A menispermaceous endocarp	
Menispermaceae	†Palaeosinomenium	†Palaeosinomenium venablesii	Chandler, 1961	A menispermaceous endocarp First described from the English Eocene (1961)	
Menispermaceae	†Palaeosinomenium	†Palaeosinomenium sp.		A menispermaceous endocarp Not identified to species	
Menispermaceae	Parabaena	†Cf. Parabaena europaea		A menispermaceous endocarp Fossil similar to P. europaea Not identified to species	
Menispermaceae	?Pericampylus	?Pericampylus sp.		A tentative Pericampylus species endocarp. not described to species	
Menispermaceae	Stephania	†Stephania hootae	Collinson, Manchester, & Wilde, 2012	A Stephania species seed	
Menispermaceae	†Tinomiscoidea	†Tinomiscoidea jacquesii	Collinson, Manchester, & Wilde, 2012	A menispermaceous endocarp	
Menispermaceae	†Wardensheppeya	†Wardensheppeya sp.		A menispermaceous endocarp Not identified to species	
Menispermaceae	incertae sedis	incertae sedis		menispermaceous endocarp of Tinosporeae subfamily affinity 3 morphotypes not identified to genus/species	

== Superasterids ==
=== Campanulids ===
Family	Genus	Species	Authority	Notes	Image
Torricelliaceae	Toricellia	†Toricellia bonesii	(Manchester) Manchester	A Toricellia species. Endocarp with germination valve	

=== Cornales ===
Family	Genus	Species	Authority	Notes	Image
Alangiaceae	Alangium	Alangium sp.		An Alangium species likely belonging to Alangium sect. Marlea. Not identified to species Identified from single endocarp, others likely in Messel collections	
Cornaceae	Cornus	†Cornus orbifera	Heer	A dogwood species	
Nyssaceae	Cf. †Beckettia	incertae sedis		A germination valve similar to Beckettia; Not identified to species	
Nyssaceae	†Eomastixia	Cf. Eomastixia rugosa		An endocarp similar to Eomastixia rugosa Not identified to species	
Nyssaceae	?Mastixia	incertae sedis		A possible Mastixia endocarp and mesocarp Possibly included in a coprolite Not identified to species	
Nyssaceae	†Mastixiopsis	†Mastixiopsis nyssoides	Kirchheimer	A nyssaceous endocarp	
Nyssaceae	Nyssa	†Nyssa disseminata	(R. Ludw.) Kirchheimer	A nyssaceous endocarp with germination valve	
Nyssaceae	Nyssa	†Nyssa europaea	Unger	A nyssaceous species	
Nyssaceae	Nyssa	†Nyssa ornithobroma	Unger	A nyssaceous species	

=== Ericales ===
Family	Genus	Species	Authority	Notes	Image
Pentaphylacaceae	Cleyera	incertae sedis		A Cleyera species. Not identified to species	
Symplocaceae	Symplocos	†Symplocos minutula	(Sternberg) Kirchheimer	A Symplocos species fruit.	
Theaceae	†Camelliacarpoidea	†Camelliacarpoidea messelensis	Collinson, Manchester, & Wilde	A theaceous species. A dry fruit with persistent calyx	

=== Lamiids ===
Family	Genus	Species	Authority	Notes	Image
Apocynaceae	†Cypselites	incertae sedis		A Cypselites species Elongated seed with wind dispersal hairs. Not identified to species, 11 specimens known	
Bignoniaceae	†Darmstadtia	Darmstadtia biseriata		A catalpa species. Pods with dry seeds lacking wind dispersal wings Described from2 specimens	
Icacinaceae	†Palaeohosiea	†Palaeohosiea bilinica	(Ettingshausen) Kvaček & Bůžek	A phytocrenaceous species. known from endocarps	
Icacinaceae	†Palaeohosiea	incertae sedis		A Palaeohosiea endocarp. Not identified to species	
Icacinaceae	Cleyera	incertae sedis	Collinson, Manchester, & Wilde	A Cleyera species. Not identified to species	
Icacinaceae	†Icacinicarya	Icacinicarya densipunctata	Collinson, Manchester, & Wilde	An icacinaceous species.	
Icacinaceae	†Icacinicarya	Icacinicarya tiffneyi	Collinson, Manchester, & Wilde	An icacinaceous species. endocarp with a preserved layer of soft tissue	
Icacinaceae	†Icacinicarya	incertae sedis		An Icacinicarya endocarp. Not identified to species	
Icacinaceae	Cf. Natsiatum	incertae sedis		An endocarp similar to Natsiatum. Not identified to species	
Icacinaceae	†Palaeophytocrene	incertae sedis		A Palaeophytocrene endocarp. Not identified to species	
Icacinaceae	Phytocrene	†Phytocrene punctilinearis	Collinson, Manchester, & Wilde	A Phytocrene species.	
Icacinaceae	Pyrenacantha	"Species 1"	Collinson, Manchester, & Wilde	An unnamed Pyrenacantha species. endocarp with a preserved layer of soft tissue	
Icacinaceae	Pyrenacantha	"Species 2"	Collinson, Manchester, & Wilde	An unnamed Pyrenacantha species. endocarp without a preserved layer of soft tissue	
Icacinaceae	Cf. Pyrenacantha	incertae sedis	Collinson, Manchester, & Wilde	An endocarp similar to Pyrenacantha. not identified to species	

== Superrosids ==
=== Fabids ===
Family	Genus	Species	Authority	Notes	Image
Cannabaceae	Aphananthe	Cf. †Aphananthe tenuicostata		A hemp relative fruit. Similar to Aphananthe tenuicostata	
Celastraceae	Celastrus	†Celastrus elaenus	Unger	A Celastrus species.	
Celastraceae	Celastrus	†Celastrus friedrichi	Wonnacott	A Celastrus species.	
Celastraceae	Celastrus	†Celastrus illicinoides	Engelhardt	A Celastrus species.	
Celastraceae	Celastrus	†Celastrus oxyphyllus	Unger	A Celastrus species.	
Celastraceae	Elaeodendron	†Elaeodendron degener	(Unger) Ettingshausen	An Elaeodendron species.	
Celastraceae	Elaeodendron	†Elaeodendron dryadum	Ettingshausen	An Elaeodendron species. Similar to the living E. orientale	
Celastraceae	Elaeodendron	†Elaeodendron obovatifolium	Engelhardt	An Elaeodendron species.	
Celastraceae	Euonymus	†Euonymus heerii	Ettingshausen	A Euonymus species.	
Elaeocarpaceae	Sloanea	†Sloanea messelensis	Collinson, Manchester, & Wilde	A Sloanea species fruit.	
Euphorbiaceae	†Euphorbiotheca	†Euphorbiotheca gothii	Collinson, Manchester, & Wilde	Trilocular euphorb fruits.	
Fabaceae	†Mimosites	†Mimosites spiegeli	Engelhardt	A caesalpinioid legume species pod.	
Fabaceae	†Leguminocarpon	†Leguminocarpon herendeenii	Collinson, Manchester, & Wilde	A legume species pod.	
Fabaceae	†Leguminocarpon	†Leguminocarpon sp.		Legume species pods. 2 mophotypes noted not identified to species	
Juglandaceae	†Cruciptera	†Cruciptera schaarschmidtii	Manchester, Collinson, & Goth	A juglandaceous winged fruit.	
Juglandaceae	†Hooleya	†Hooleya sp.		A juglandaceous fruiting raceme. Not identified to species.	
Juglandaceae	†Palaeocarya	†Palaeocarya sp.		A juglandaceous fruit. Not identified to species.	
Rhamnaceae	Berchemia	†Berchemia mellerae	Collinson, Manchester, & Wilde	A Berchemia buckthorn species fruit.	
Rosaceae	Prunus	†Prunus pereger	Unger	A cherry relative	
Ulmaceae	†Cedrelospermum	†Cedrelospermum leptospermum	(Ettingshausen) Manchester emend. Wilde & Manchester	An ulmaceous elm relative fruit.	

=== Malvids ===
Family	Genus	Species	Authority	Notes	Image
Anacardiaceae	Anacardium	†Anacardium germanicum	Manchester, Wilde & Collinson	A cashew species. The first European record of the genus Known from at least 16 fruits and hypocarps	
Anacardiaceae	Lannea	†Lannea hessenensis	Collinson, Manchester, & Wilde	A Lannea species. Fruits are unilocular, separating them from Lannea europaea 23 specimens in the type series	
Anacardiaceae	Mangifera	†Mangifera tertiaria	Ettingshausen	A mango relative.	
Anacardiaceae	†Pentoperculum	†Pentoperculum minimus	(Reid & Chandler) Manchester	A spondiadeous cashew relative. Rounded-pentangular fruits in transverse cross-section Identified from 7 fossils	
Anacardiaceae	Pleiogynium	†Pleiogynium mitchellii	(Reid & Chandler) Manchester	A Pleiogynium species. A larger spondiadeous fruit with 10 germination valves Described from the holotype only	
Anacardiaceae	Rhus	†Rhus meriani	Heer	A sumac relative.	
Anacardiaceae	Rhus	†Rhus saportana	Pilar	A sumac relative.	
Anacardiaceae	Rhus	†Rhus ternata	Engelhardt	A sumac relative.	
Anacardiaceae	Tapiscia	†Tapiscia pusilla	(Reid & Chandler) Mai	A Tapiscia species fruit. Some fruits possibly preserved in coprolites	
Burseraceae	†Bursericarpum	†Bursericarpum species		A Bursericarpum species endocarp. Not identified to species	
Burseraceae	Canarium	Canarium sp.		A Canarium species endocarp. Not identified to species	
Malvaceae	†Byttneriopsis	†Byttneriopsis daphnogenes	(Ettingshausen) Kvaček & Wilde	A malvaceous leaf morphotaxon	
Malvaceae	†Byttneriopsis	†Byttneriopsis spiegelii	(Ettingshausen) Kvaček & Wilde	A malvaceous leaf morphotaxon	
Malvaceae	†Byttneriopsis	†Byttneriopsis steuerii	Kvaček & Wilde	A malvaceous leaf morphotaxon	
Rutaceae	†Rutaspermum	†Rutaspermum chandleri	Collinson & Gregor	A citrus family seed.	
Rutaceae	Toddalia	†Toddalia ovata	Wilde	A Toddalia leaf morphospecies Host to Phytomyzites schaarschmidti trace fossils - leaf mines attributed to agromyzid flies	
Rutaceae	Cf. Toddalia	incertae sedis		A Seed similar to Toddalia. Not identified to genus/species	
Sapindaceae	Dodonaea	†Dodonaea salicites	Ettingshausen	A Dodonaea species	
Sapindaceae	Sapindus	†Sapindus cupanioides	Ettingshausen	A Sapindus species	
Sapindaceae	Sapindus	†Sapindus dubius	Unger	A Sapindus species	
Sapindaceae	Sapindus	†Sapindus firmifolius	Engelhardt	A Sapindus species	
Sapindaceae	Sapindus	†Sapindus heliconius	Unger	A Sapindus species	
Sapindaceae	Thouinia	†Thouinia occidentalis	Engelhardt	A Thouinia species	
Simaroubaceae	Ailanthus	†Ailanthus confucii	Unger	An Ailanthus seed.	

=== Myrtales ===
Family	Genus	Species	Authority	Notes	Image
Lythraceae	Cf. Decodon	Incertae sedis		Seeds of similar morphology to Decodon Not identified to species	

=== Saxifragales ===
Family	Genus	Species	Authority	Notes	Image
Altingiaceae	†Steinhauera	†Steinhauera subglobosa	Presl emend Mai, 1968	A sweet gum species. Raceme with at least 7 infructecences	
Hamamelidaceae	Mytilaria	†Mytilaria boglei	Collinson, Manchester, & Wilde	A Mytilaria species infructecence.	
Hamamelidaceae	Corylopsis	†Corylopsis maii	Collinson, Manchester, & Wilde, 2012	A winter hazel species infructecence.	
Hamamelidaceae	Corylopsis	†Corylopsis waltheri	Collinson, Manchester, & Wilde, 2012	Isolated winter hazel species seeds.	

=== Vitaceae ===
Family	Genus	Species	Authority	Notes	Image
Vitaceae	Ampelopsis	Ampelopsis sp.		A peppervine species seed. not identified to species	
Vitaceae	Cayratia	†Cayratia jungii	(Gregor) Chen & Manchester	A Cayratia species seed.	
Vitaceae	†Crassivitisemen	†Crassivitisemen wildei	(Chen & Manchester) Collinson, Manchester, & Wilde	Vitaceous species fruits and seeds. Fruits with soft tissue preservation	
Vitaceae	†Palaeovitis	†Palaeovitis sp.		A vitaceous species seed. not identified to species	
Vitaceae	Parthenocissus	†Parthenocissus britannica	(Heer) Chandler, 1957	Virginia creeper species fruits and seeds.	
Vitaceae	Vitis	†Vitis messelensis	Collinson, Manchester, & Wilde, 2012	Grape species fruits and seeds. Some specimens preserved in coprolites	

== Incertae sedis ==
Carpolitus is a plant morphogenus circumscribed for fossil fruits and seeds that are distinct but not identifiable to defined taxa. Collinson, Manchester, & Wilde (2012) described but did not name 63 distinct Carpolithus morphotypes from the Messel Formation.

Genus	Species	Authority	Notes	Image
†Carpolithus	†Carpolithus anacardiaceus	Engelhardt	Doubtfully referred to Anacardiaceae per Edwards & Wonnacott (1935)	
†Carpolithus	†Carpolithus callosaeoides	(Engelhardt)	A Carpolithus species with thick woody tissues	
†Carpolithus	†Carpolithus drupaceus	Engelhardt	A fruit of possible rosaceous affinity	
†Carpolithus	†Carpolithus euphoriaeoides	Engelhardt	A Carpolithus species fruit Suggested to be similar to Euphoria	
†Carpolithus	†Carpolithus sapindiformis	Engelhardt	A Carpolithus species fruit Suggested to possibly be affiliated to Sapindus leaves	
†Carpolithus	†Carpolithus sapindoides	Engelhardt	A Carpolithus species fruit Suggested to possibly be comparable to Sapindus fruits	
†Carpolithus	Species 1–62		various distinct morphotypes	
†Lagokarpos	incertae sedis		A Lagokarpos species winged fruit Not identified to species	
†Saportaspermum	†Saportaspermum kovacsiae		A Saportaspermum species winged seed Suggested to have malvaceous affinity	
†Spirellea	†incertae sedis		A Spirellea species seed Not identified to species	

== Pollen and spores ==
The first foray into Messel palynology was produced by H. D. Pflug (1952) with follow-up papers in 1957 and coauthored with P. Thomas in 1953. The pollen and spore record was revised and expanded by Heidemarie Thiele-Pfeiffer (1988) who provided the largest in depth palynological work focusing exclusively on the Messel Formation.

=== Pteridophyte spores ===
Family	Genus	Species	Authority	Notes	Image
Osmundaceae	†Baculatisporites	†Baculatisporites primarius	(Wolff) Thomson & Pflug	A royal fern palynospecies	
Polypodiaceae	†Polypodiaceoisporites	†Polypodiaceoisporites gracillimus	Nagy	Fern spores polypodiaceous affinity	
Polypodiaceae	†Polypodiaceoisporites	†Polypodiaceoisporites lusaticus	Krutzsch	Fern spores polypodiaceous affinity	
Schizaeaceae	†Cicatricosisporites	†Cicatricosisporites dorogensis	Potonié & Gelletich	A schizaeaceous fern palynospecies	
Schizaeaceae	†Cicatricosisporites	†Cicatricosisporites paradorogensis	Krutzsch	A schizaeaceous fern palynospecies	
Schizaeaceae	†Microfoveolatosporis	†Microfoveolatosporis granuloides	(Krutzsch) Krutzsch	A schizaeaceous fern palynospecies	
?Schizaeaceae	†Ischyosporites	†Ischyosporites tertiarius	Krutzsch	A palynospecies of possible schizaeaceous fern affinity	
incertae sedis	†Laevigatosporites	†Laevigatosporites discordatus	Pflug	A palynospecies of possible Schizaeaceae or Polypodiaceae S. L. affinity	
incertae sedis	†Laevigatosporites	†Laevigatosporites haardtii	(Potonié & Venitz) Thomson & Pflug	A palynospecies of possible Schizaeaceae or Polypodiaceae S. L. affinity	
incertae sedis	†Leiotriletes	†Leiotriletes kopeckii	Kedves	Fern spores of Schizaeaceae or Polypodiaceae S. L. affinity	
incertae sedis	†Leiotriletes	†Leiotriletes maxoides	Krutzsch	Fern spores of Schizaeaceae or Polypodiaceae S. L. affinity	
incertae sedis	†Leiotriletes	†Leiotriletes microadriennis	Krutzsch	Fern spores of Schizaeaceae or Polypodiaceae S. L. affinity	
incertae sedis	†Leiotriletes	†Leiotriletes triangulus	Murriger & Pflug	Fern spores of Schizaeaceae or Polypodiaceae S. L. affinity	
incertae sedis	†Leiotriletes	†Leiotriletes sp.		Fern spores of Schizaeaceae and Polypodiaceae S. L. affinity A palynomorph component in zone 1 of the Messel Formation.	

=== Lycophyte spores ===
Family	Genus	Species	Authority	Notes	Image
Selaginellaceae	†Echinatisporis	†Echinatisporis hungaricus	Kedves	A spikemoss palynospecies	

=== Conifer pollens ===
Family	Genus	Species	Authority	Notes	Image
Cupressaceae	†Cupressacites	†Cupressacites insulipapillatus	(Trevisan) Krutzsch	A taxodioid cypress family palynospecies	
Cupressaceae	†Inaperturopollenites	†Inaperturopollenites concedipites	(Wodehouse) Krutzsch	A taxodioid cypress family palynospecies	
Cupressaceae	†Inaperturopollenites	†Inaperturopollenites verrupapillatus	Trevisan	A taxodioid cypress family palynospecies	
Pinaceae	†Pityosporites	†Pityosporites labdacus	(Potonié) Thomson & Pflug	A pine family palynomorph. A component in zone 1–3 of the Messel Formation.	
Pinaceae	†Pityosporites	†Pityosporites microalatus	(Potonié) Thomson Pflug	A pine family palynomorph.	

=== Basal angiosperm pollens ===
Family	Genus	Species	Authority	Notes	Image
Nymphaeaceae	†Monocolpopollenites	†Monocolpopollenites crassiexinus	Thiele-Pfeiffer	A waterlily family palynospecies Possibly affiliated with Nymphaea	

=== Chloranthalean pollens ===
Family	Genus	Species	Authority	Notes	Image
Chloranthaceae	†Emmapollis	†Emmapollis pseudoemmaensis	Thiele-Pfeiffer	A chloranthaceous palynomorph Possibly affiliated with Ascarina or Ascarinopsis	

=== Magnoliid pollens ===
Family	Genus	Species	Authority	Notes	Image
Magnoliaceae	†Magnolipollis	†Magnolipollis magnolioides	Krutzsch	A magnolia family palynospecies Possible affiliated with Magnolia or Michelia	

=== Monocot pollens ===
==== Alismatalean pollens ====
Family	Genus	Species	Authority	Notes	Image
Hydrocharitaceae	†Punctilongisulcites	†Punctilongisulcites microechinatus	Thiele-Pfeiffer	A frogbit palynomorph A component in zone 1 of the Messel Formation. Possibly affiliated with Blyxa, Ottelia, or Stratiotes	

==== Arecalean pollens ====
Family	Genus	Species	Authority	Notes	Image
Arecaceae	†Monocolpopollenites	†Monocolpopollenites tranquillus	(Potonié) Thomson & Pflug	A palm family palynospecies Possibly affiliated with Phoenix	

==== Commelinid pollens ====
Family	Genus	Species	Authority	Notes	Image
Cyperaceae	†Cyperaceaepollis	†Cyperaceaepollis germanicus	Krutzsch	A sedge family palynospecies Affiliated with Carex or possibly Lepironia	
Cyperaceae	†Cyperaceaepollis	Unnamed	Krutzsch	A sedge family palynomorph of uncertain generic affinity	
Restionaceae	†Milfordia	†Milfordia incerta	(Thomson & Pflug) Krutzsch	A restiad family palynospecies Possibly affiliated with Hypolaena, Leptocarpus, Lepyrodia, or Restio	
Restionaceae	†Milfordia	†Milfordia minima	Krutzsch	A restiad family palynospecies Possibly affiliated with Lyginia	

=== Superasterid pollens ===
==== Campanulid pollens ====
Family	Genus	Species	Authority	Notes	Image
Aquifoliaceae	†Ilexpollenites	†Ilexpollenites iliacus	(Potonié) Thiergart	A holly family pollen Affiliated with Ilex	
Aquifoliaceae	†Ilexpollenites	†Ilexpollenites margaritatus	(Potonié) Thiergart	A holly family pollen Possibly affiliated Ilex mucronata	
Aquifoliaceae	†Ilexpollenites	†Ilexpollenites propinquus	(Potonié) Potonié	A holly family pollen Possibly affiliated Ilex mucronata	
Araliaceae	†Araliaceoipollenites	†Araliaceoipollenites euphori	(Potonié) Potonié	An araliaceous pollen	
Araliaceae	†Araliaceoipollenites	†Araliaceoipollenites reticuloides	Thiele-Pfeiffer	An araliaceous pollen	

==== Cornalean pollens ====
Family	Genus	Species	Authority	Notes	Image
Nyssaceae	†Nyssapollenites	†Nyssapollenites kruschii	Potonié	A nyssaceous palynospecies. Two described subspecies N. k. subsp. accessorius & N. k. subsp. analepticus	

==== Ericalean pollens ====
Family	Genus	Species	Authority	Notes	Image
Ericaceae	†Ericipites	†Ericipites callidus	(Potonié) Krutzsch	A heather/heath family palynomorph Of uncertain generic affiliation	
Ericaceae	†Ericipites	†Ericipites ericius	(Potonié) Potonié	A heather/heath family palynomorph Of uncertain generic affiliation	
Symplocaceae	†Porocolpopollenites	†Porocolpopollenites rarobaculatus	Thiele-Pfeiffer	A sweetleaf family palynospecies. Affiliated with Symplocos	

==== Lamiid pollens ====
Family	Genus	Species	Authority	Notes	Image
Icacinaceae	†Compositoipollenites	†Compositoipollenites rhizophorus	(Potonié) Potonié	A moonseed palynomorph affiliated with Iodes.	

==== Santalalean pollens ====
Family	Genus	Species	Authority	Notes	Image
Olacaceae	†Anacolosidites	†Anacolosidites efflatus	(Potonié) Erdtman	An anacoloseous palynospecies	
Olacaceae	†Olaxipollis	Cf. †Olaxipollis matthesi		An olacaceous palynomorph Possibly affiliated with O. matthesi	

=== Superrosid pollens ===
==== Fabid pollens ====
Family	Genus	Species	Authority	Notes	Image
Betulaceae	†Polyvestibulopollenites	†Polyvestibulopollenites verus	(Potonié) Thomson & Pflug	A betulaceous palynospecies Affiliated with Alnus	
Cannabaceae	†Celtipollenites	†Celtipollenites intrastructurus	(Krutzsch & Vanhoorne) Thiele-Pfeiffer	A hemp family palynospecies Affiliated with Celtis	
Cannabaceae	†Celtipollenites	†Celtipollenites laevigatus	Thiele-Pfeiffer	A hemp family palynospecies Affiliated with Celtis	
Juglandaceae	†Caryapollenites	†Caryapollenites circulus	(Pflug) Krutzsch	A Walnut family palynospecies Affiliated with Carya	
Juglandaceae	†Caryapollenites	Cf. †Caryapollenites triangulus		A Walnut family palynospecies Possibly affiliated with Caryapollenites triangulus	
Juglandaceae	†Labraferoidaepollenites	†Labraferoidaepollenites menatensis	Kedves	A Walnut family palynospecies Possibly affiliated with Engelhardia	
Juglandaceae	†Momipites	†Momipites punctatus	(Potonié) Nagy	A Walnut family palynospecies Possibly affiliated with Engelhardia, Oreomunnea, or Aifaroa	
Juglandaceae	†Momipites	†Momipites quietus	(Potonié) Nichols	A Walnut family palynospecies Possibly affiliated with Engelhardia	
Juglandaceae	†Nudopollis	†Nudopollis terminalis	(Thomson & Pflug) Pflug	A Walnut family palynospecies One named subspecies N. terminalis subsp hastaformis	
Juglandaceae	†Platycaryapollenites	†Platycaryapollenites miocaenicus	Nagy	A Walnut family palynospecies Affiliated with Platycarya	
Juglandaceae	†Platycaryapollenites	†Platycaryapollenites platycaryoides	(Roche) Kedves	A Walnut family palynospecies Affiliated with Platycarya	
Juglandaceae	†Platycaryapollenites	†Platycaryapollenites semicyclus	(Krutzsch & Vanhoorne) Thiele-Pfeiffer	A Walnut family palynospecies Possibly affiliated with Platycarya	
Juglandaceae	†Platycaryapollenites	†Platycaryapollenites sp.		A Walnut family palynospecies Affiliated with Platycarya; A component in zone 1–3 of the Messel Formation.	
Juglandaceae	†Plicatopollis	†Plicatopollis hungaricus	Kedves	A Walnut family palynospecies	
Juglandaceae	†Plicatopollis	†Plicatopollis plicatus	(Potonié) Krutzsch	A Walnut family palynospecies	
Juglandaceae	†Plicatopollis	†Plicatopollis pseudoexcelsus	Krutzsch	A Walnut family palynospecies One named subspecies P. p. subsp. microturgidus Two unnamed subspecies	
Juglandaceae	†Plicatopollis	†Plicatopollis Sp.		A Walnut family palynospecies Not identified to species	
Juglandaceae	†Pterocaryapollenites	†Pterocaryapollenites stellatus	(Potonié) Thiergart	A Walnut family palynospecies Affiliated with Pterocarya	
?Juglandaceae	†Plicatopollis	†Plicatopollis lunatus	Kedves	A palynospecies of possible juglandaceous affinity	
Ulmaceae	†Polyporopollenites	†Polyporopollenites eoulmoides	Krutzsch & Vanhoorne	An elm family palynospecies	
Ulmaceae	†Polyporopollenites	†Polyporopollenites undulosus	(Wolf) Thomson & Pflug	An elm family palynospecies Possibly affiliated with Ulmus or Zelkova	
Ulmaceae	†Polyporopollenites	†Polyporopollenites verrucatus	(Wolf) Thomson & Pflug	An elm family palynospecies Possibly affiliated with Hemiptelea	

==== Malvid pollens ====
Family	Genus	Species	Authority	Notes	Image
Malvaceae	†Bombacacidites	†Bombacacidites tilioides	Krutzsch	A bombacoid palynospecies Possibly affiliated with Bombax	
Malvaceae	†Bombacacidites	†Bombacacidites Sp.1		A bombacoid palynomorph Described but not formally named Affiliated with Bombax	
Malvaceae	†Bombacacidites	†Bombacacidites Sp.2		A bombacoid palynomorph Described but not formally named Affiliated with Bombax	
Malvaceae	†Intratriporopollenites	†Intratriporopollenites minimus	Mai	A tilioid palynospecies Of uncertain generic affinity	
Malvaceae	†Intratriporopollenites	Cf. †Intratriporopollenites maxoides		A tilioid palynomorph Possibly affiliated with I. maxoides	
Thymelaeaceae	†Pseudospinaepollis	†Pseudospinaepollis pseudospinosus	Krutzsch	A thymelaeaceous palynospecies Possibly affiliated with Stellera or Wikstroemia	

==== Myrtalean pollens ====
Family	Genus	Species	Authority	Notes	Image
Lythraceae	†Lythraceaepollenites	†Lythraceaepollenites minimus	Thiele-Pfeiffer	A myrtle family palynospecies Possibly affiliated with Rotala or Ammannia	
Lythraceae	†Lythraceaepollenites	†Lythraceaepollenites sp.		A myrtle family palynospecies Possibly affiliated with Rotala, Ammannia, or Woodfordia; Described but not named	

=== Incertae sedis pollens ===
Genus	Species	Authority	Notes	Image
†Brosipollis	†Brosipollis striatobrosus	(Krutzsch) Krutzsch	Possible affinity is to Gomphandra (Icacinaceae) or Burseraceae	
†Compositoipollenites	†Compositoipollenites minimus	(Krutzsch & Vanhoorne)	A palynomorph species of uncertain affiliation.	
†Labrapollis	†Labrapollis labraferus	(Potonié) Krutzsch	A palynomorph species of uncertain affiliation.	
†Multiporopollenites	†Multiporopollenites microreticulatus	Krutzsch	A palynomorph species of uncertain affiliation.	
†Multiporopollenites	†Multiporopollenites Sp.1		A palynomorph species of uncertain affiliation.	
†Multiporopollenites	†Multiporopollenites Sp.2		A palynomorph species of uncertain affiliation.	
†Pentapollenites	†Pentapollenites pentangulus	(Pflug) Krutzsch	A palynomorph species of uncertain affiliation. Two known subspecies P. p. subsp foveostriatus & P. p. subsp pentangulus	
†Pentapollenites	†Pentapollenites punctoides	Krutzsch	A palynomorph species of uncertain affiliation.	
†Pentapollenites	†Pentapollenites Sp.1		A palynomorph species of uncertain affiliation.	
†Pentapollenites	†Pentapollenites Sp.2		A palynomorph species of uncertain affiliation.	
†Pollenites	†Pollenites setarius	Potonié	A palynomorph species of uncertain affiliation.	
†Pompeckjoidaepollenites	†Pompeckjoidaepollenites subhercynicus	(Krutzsch) Krutzsch	A palynomorph species of uncertain affiliation.	
†Tricolporopollenites	†Tricolporopollenites messelensis	Thiele-Pfeiffer	A palynomorph with suggested affinity to Oleaceae or Rutaceae; A component in zone 1 of the Messel Formation.	
†Tricolporopollenites	†Tricolporopollenites solé de portai	Thiele-Pfeiffer	A palynomorph with suggested affinity to Rosaceae; A component in zone 1 of the Messel Formation.	
