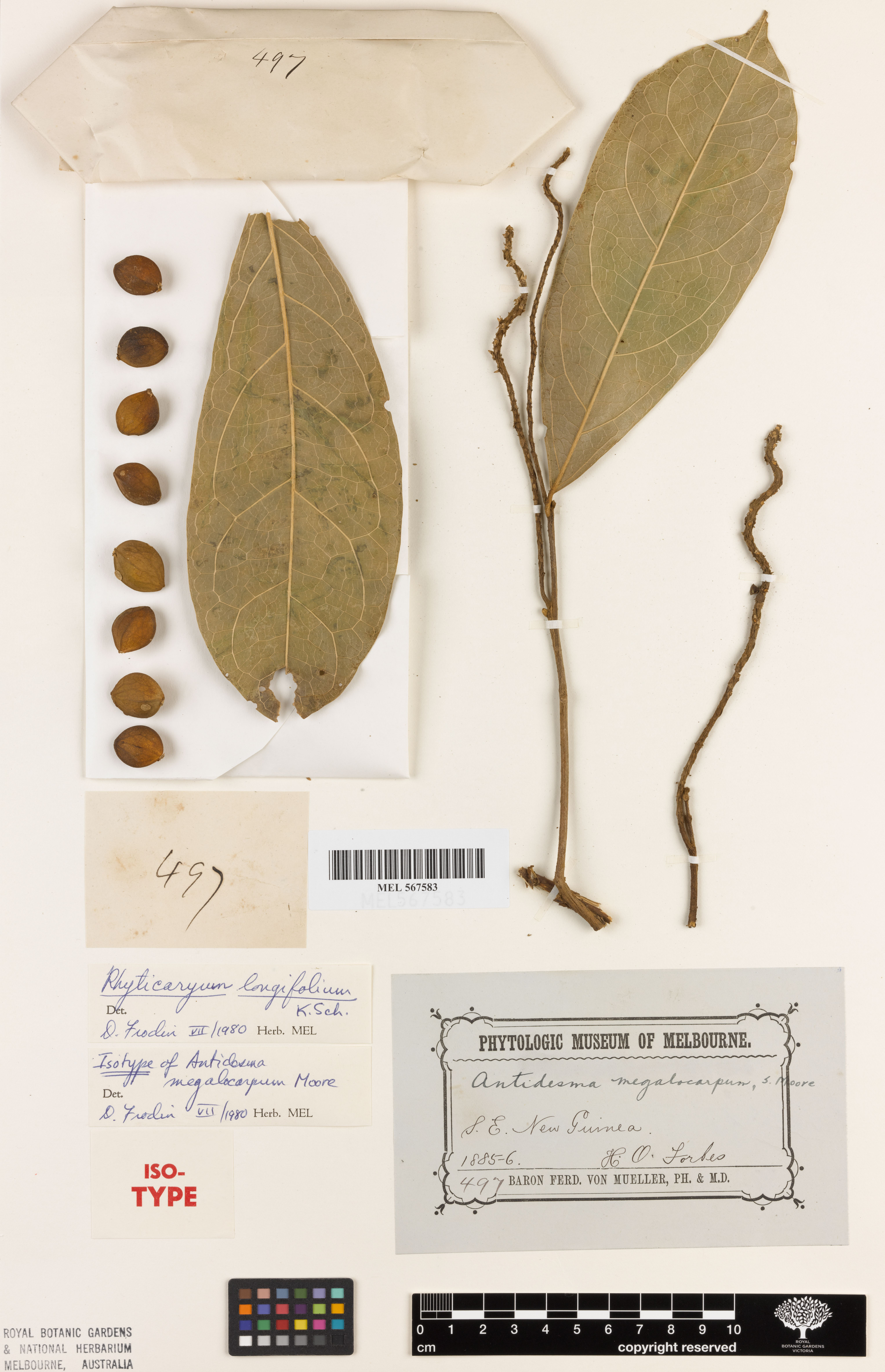
- Herbarium specimen

Conservation status
- Least Concern (IUCN 3.1)

Scientific classification
- Kingdom: Plantae
- Clade: Embryophytes
- Clade: Tracheophytes
- Clade: Spermatophytes
- Clade: Angiosperms
- Clade: Eudicots
- Clade: Asterids
- Order: Icacinales
- Family: Icacinaceae
- Genus: Ryticaryum
- Species: R. longifolium

Binomial name
- Ryticaryum longifolium K.Schum.

Synonyms
- 8 synonyms: Pocillaria pubescens Ridl.; Ryticaryum bullatum G.Schellenb.; Ryticaryum elongatum G.Schellenb.; Ryticaryum oblongum G.Schellenb.; Ryticaryum oncocarpum K.Schum. & Lauterb.; Ryticaryum ovale G.Schellenb.; Ryticaryum pubescens (Ridl.) Sleumer; Antidesma megalocarpum S.Moore

= Ryticaryum longifolium =

Species of flowering plant

Ryticaryum longifolium is a species of plant in the family Icacinaceae, native to New Guinea, the Solomon Islands and Cape York Peninsula in Queensland, Australia.

== Description ==
Ryticaryum longifolium is a shrub growing to about 5 m (16 ft) in height. New growth is covered by short brown hairs. The leaves are mostly hairless, up to 18 cm (7.1 in) long and 6 cm (2.4 in) wide. They have between seven and ten lateral veins on either side of the midrib and are attached to the twigs by a petiole about 8 mm (0.31 in) long.

Small flowers about 2 mm (0.08 in) long are borne on spikes about 4 cm (1.6 in) long. The fruit is red ovoid drupe about 2 cm (0.8 in) long and 1.5 cm (0.6 in) wide, and contains a single seed. This species is dioecious, meaning that pistillate (functionally female) and staminate (functionally male) flowers are borne on separate plants.

== Distribution and habitat ==
This species is mostly found in gallery forest alongside watercourses but may also occur in rainforest; the altitudinal range is from close to sea level up to about 500 m (1,600 ft) in Australia, and up to 1,800 m (5,900 ft) in New Guinea.

== Conservation ==
As of June 2026, this species has been assessed to be of least concern by the International Union for Conservation of Nature (IUCN) and by the Queensland Government under its Nature Conservation Act.

== Uses ==
In the Solomon Islands, the leaves are cooked and eaten.
