= Pyrenacantha cordicula =

Conservation status
- Endangered (IUCN 3.1)

Scientific classification
- Kingdom: Plantae
- Clade: Tracheophytes
- Clade: Angiosperms
- Clade: Eudicots
- Clade: Asterids
- Order: Icacinales
- Family: Icacinaceae
- Genus: Pyrenacantha
- Species: P. cordicula

Binomial name
- Pyrenacantha cordicula Villiers

Species of flowering plant

Pyrenacantha cordicula is a species of plant in the Icacinaceae family. It is found in Cameroon, Ivory Coast, Equatorial Guinea, and Ghana. Its natural habitat is subtropical or tropical moist lowland forests. It is threatened by habitat loss.
