= Mappia racemosa =

Conservation status
- Least Concern (IUCN 3.1)

Scientific classification
- Kingdom: Plantae
- Clade: Embryophytes
- Clade: Tracheophytes
- Clade: Spermatophytes
- Clade: Angiosperms
- Clade: Eudicots
- Clade: Asterids
- Order: Icacinales
- Family: Icacinaceae
- Genus: Mappia
- Species: M. racemosa

Binomial name
- Mappia racemosa Jacq.

Synonyms
- Icacina dubia Macfad.; Leretia angustifolia (Griseb.) House; Leretia racemosa (Jacq.) House; Leretia racemosa var. brachycarpa (Griseb.) Sleumer; Mappia affinis Miers; Mappia angustifolia Griseb.; Mappia racemosa var. angustifolia M.Gómez; Mappia racemosa subsp. brachycarpa (Griseb.) Borhidi; Mappia racemosa var. brachycarpa Griseb.; Mappia racemosa var. typica R.A.Howard

Species of flowering plant

Mappia racemosa is a species of flowering plant in the Icacinaceae family. It is a tree native to central and southern Mexico, Costa Rica, Panama, Cuba, the Dominican Republic, Haiti, Jamaica, and Puerto Rico. It is threatened by habitat loss.
