= Alsodeiopsis schumannii =

Conservation status
- Least Concern (IUCN 3.1)

Scientific classification
- Kingdom: Plantae
- Clade: Tracheophytes
- Clade: Angiosperms
- Clade: Eudicots
- Clade: Asterids
- Order: Icacinales
- Family: Icacinaceae
- Genus: Alsodeiopsis
- Species: A. schumannii

Binomial name
- Alsodeiopsis schumannii (Engl.) Engl.

Synonyms
- Alsodeiidium schumanii Engl.

Species of shrub

Alsodeiopsis schumannii is a species of plant in the Icacinaceae family. It is endemic to Tanzania, specifically the East Usambara, the Uluguru Mountains, and the Southern Highlands.

It is an evergreen shrub or tree up to 12 m (40 ft) tall. The fruit, an oblong drupe ripening to orange-red, is edible with sweet and juicy pulp around the hard stone.
