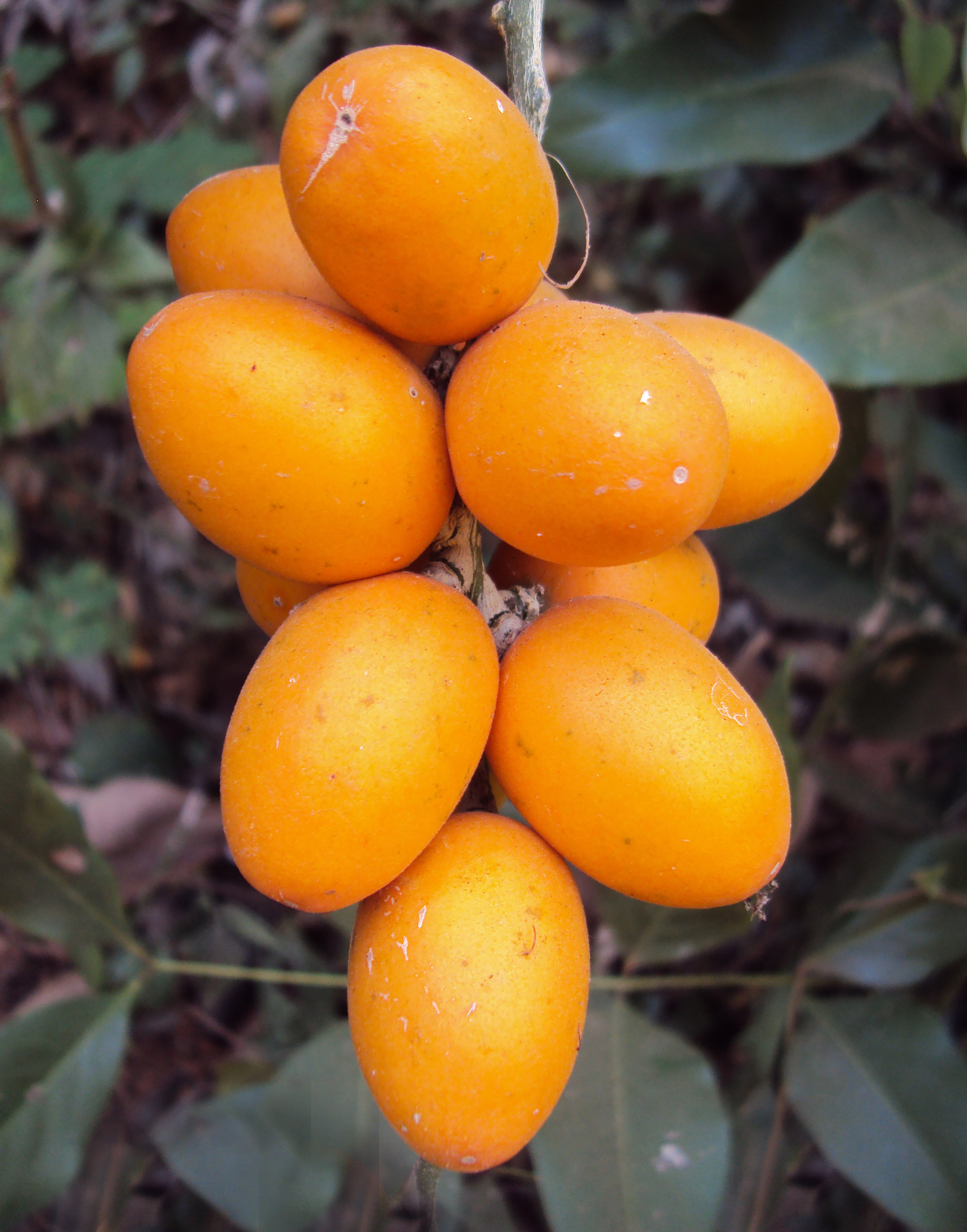
- Sarcostigma kleinii fruits

Scientific classification
- Kingdom: Plantae
- Clade: Tracheophytes
- Clade: Angiosperms
- Clade: Eudicots
- Clade: Asterids
- Order: Icacinales
- Family: Icacinaceae
- Genus: Sarcostigma
- Species: S. kleinii

Binomial name
- Sarcostigma kleinii Wight & Arn.

= Sarcostigma kleinii =

Species of plant

Sarcostigma kleinii is a large liana seen extensively in the Western Ghats. An oil is extracted from the seeds. This plant is used widely in Ayurveda.
