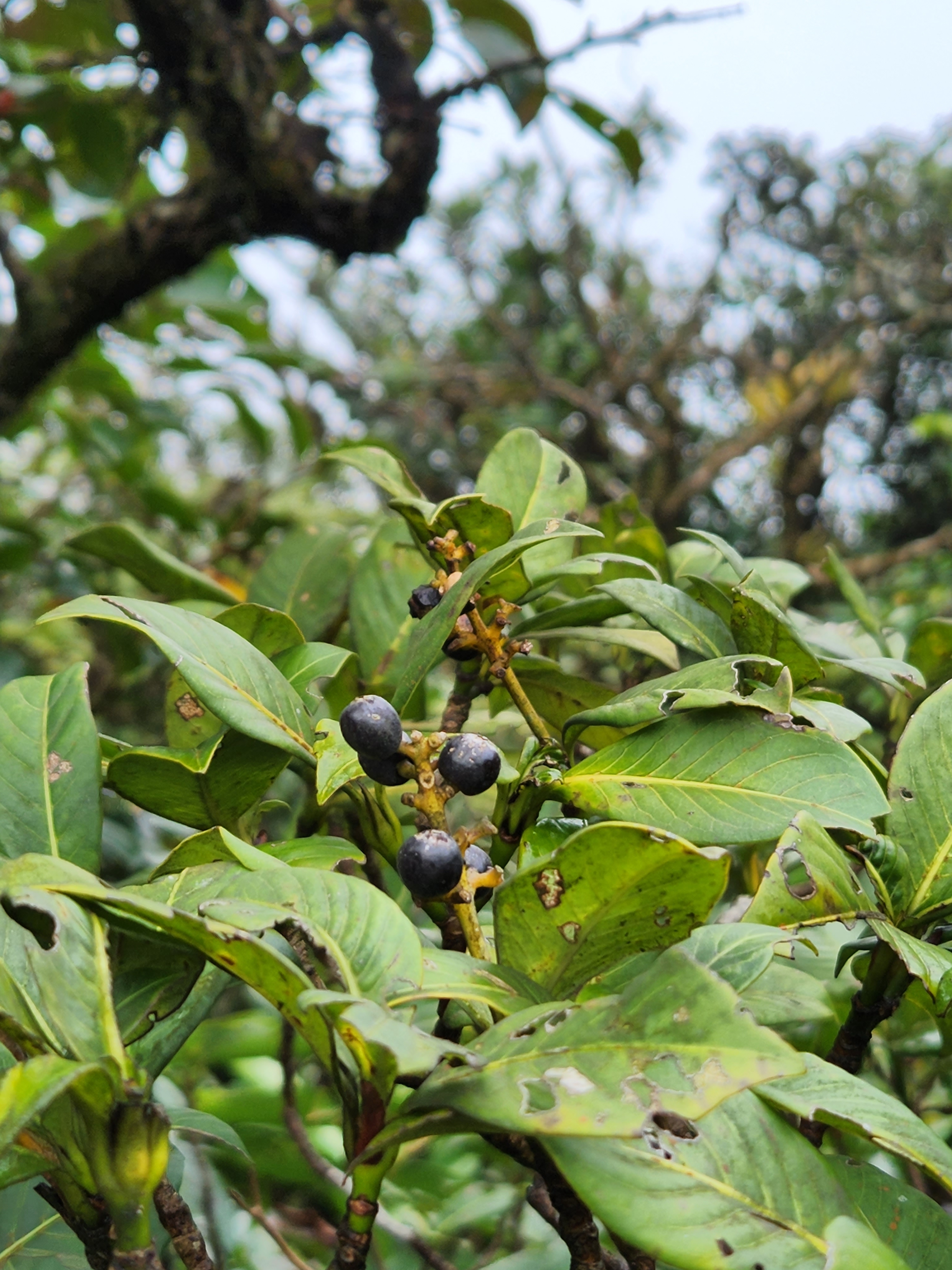

Scientific classification
- Kingdom: Plantae
- Clade: Tracheophytes
- Clade: Angiosperms
- Clade: Eudicots
- Clade: Asterids
- Order: Icacinales
- Family: Icacinaceae
- Genus: Mappia
- Species: M. nimmoniana

Binomial name
- Mappia nimmoniana (J.Graham) Byng & Stull

= Mappia nimmoniana =

Species of plant

Mappia nimmoniana is a species of flowering plant that grow naturally in Indo-Malesia and China .

== Description ==
It is a small tree growing up to 3–8 m tall. Bark is smooth grey and wrinkled and about 5 mm thick. Branchlets are corky with prominent leaf scars. Leathery and broadly egg shaped leaves are arranged alternately. Foul smelling creamy yellow flowers are bisexual, about 5 mm across and come in flat-topped clusters at the end of branches. Petals are hairy inside. Oblong to ellipsoid fruits are smooth, purplish black when ripe with a single seed.
