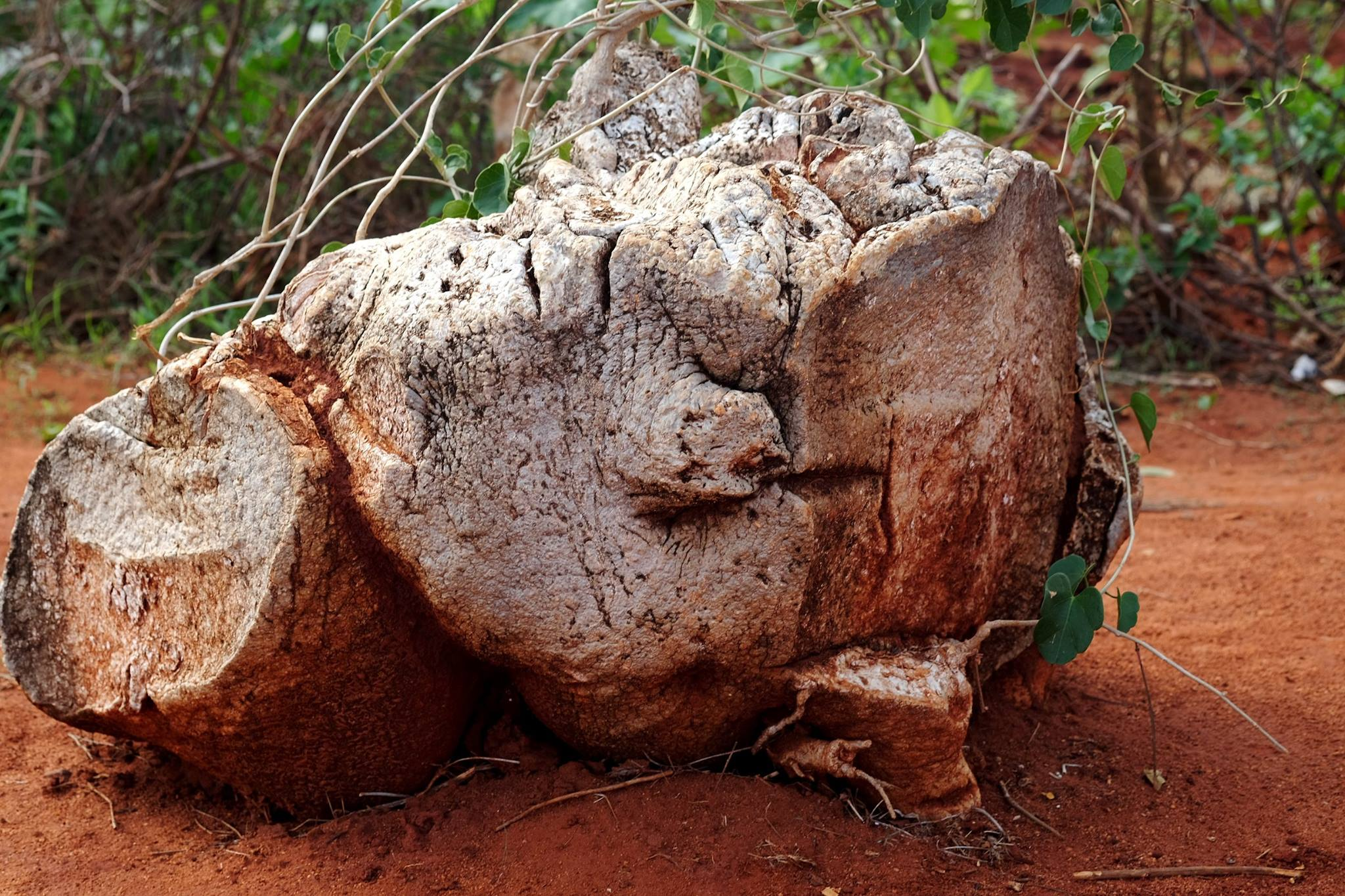
- Pyrenacantha malvifolia

Scientific classification
- Kingdom: Plantae
- Clade: Tracheophytes
- Clade: Angiosperms
- Clade: Eudicots
- Clade: Asterids
- Order: Icacinales
- Family: Icacinaceae
- Genus: Pyrenacantha
- Species: P. malvifolia

Binomial name
- Pyrenacantha malvifolia Engl.

Synonyms
- Pyrenacantha globosa Engl.; Pyrenacantha ruspolii Engl.; Trematosperma cordatum Urb.

= Pyrenacantha malvifolia =

Species of flowering plant

Pyrenacantha malvifolia, common name monkey chair, is a rare species of flowering plants in the genus Pyrenacantha belonging to the family Icacinaceae.

== Description ==
Pyrenacantha malvifolia has an above ground swollen and thickened caudex with a diameter up to 1.5 metres (4 ft 11 in). On the top of the caudex emerge some vine-like stems with green round shaped leaves. These vines in native habitat can reach 9–15 metres (30–49 ft). Flower are green and quite inconspicuous.

== Distribution ==
This species can be found in central and eastern Africa, in Somalia, Ethiopia, Kenya and Tanzania.

== Habitat ==
This plant grows in the African tropical semi-desert (usually on hillsides).
