= Desmostachys =

Scientific classification
- Kingdom: Plantae
- Clade: Tracheophytes
- Clade: Angiosperms
- Clade: Eudicots
- Clade: Asterids
- Order: Icacinales
- Family: Icacinaceae
- Genus: Desmostachys; Planch. ex Miers

Genus of plants

Desmostachys is a genus of flowering plants belonging to the family Icacinaceae.

Its native range is Western Indian Ocean.

== Species ==
Accepted species in the genus include:

- Desmostachys longipes H.Perrier
- Desmostachys planchonianus Miers
