= Mappianthus =

Scientific classification
- Kingdom: Plantae
- Clade: Tracheophytes
- Clade: Angiosperms
- Clade: Eudicots
- Clade: Asterids
- Order: Icacinales
- Family: Icacinaceae
- Genus: Mappianthus; Hand.-Mazz.

Genus of plants

Mappianthus is a genus of flowering plants belonging to the family Icacinaceae.

Its native range is southern China to western Malesia. It is found in Assam (India), Bangladesh, Borneo, China, East Himalaya (India), Hainan, Malaya, Myanmar, Sumatera and Vietnam.

The genus name of Mappianthus is in honour of Marcus Mappus (1666–1736), French doctor and botanist from Alsace and son of Marc or Marcus Mappus (1632–1701). It was first described and published in Anz. Akad. Wiss. Wien, Math.-Naturwiss. Kl. Vol.58 on page 150 in 1921.

Species, according to Kew:

- Mappianthus hookerianus (Baill.) Sleumer
- Mappianthus iodoides Hand.-Mazz.
