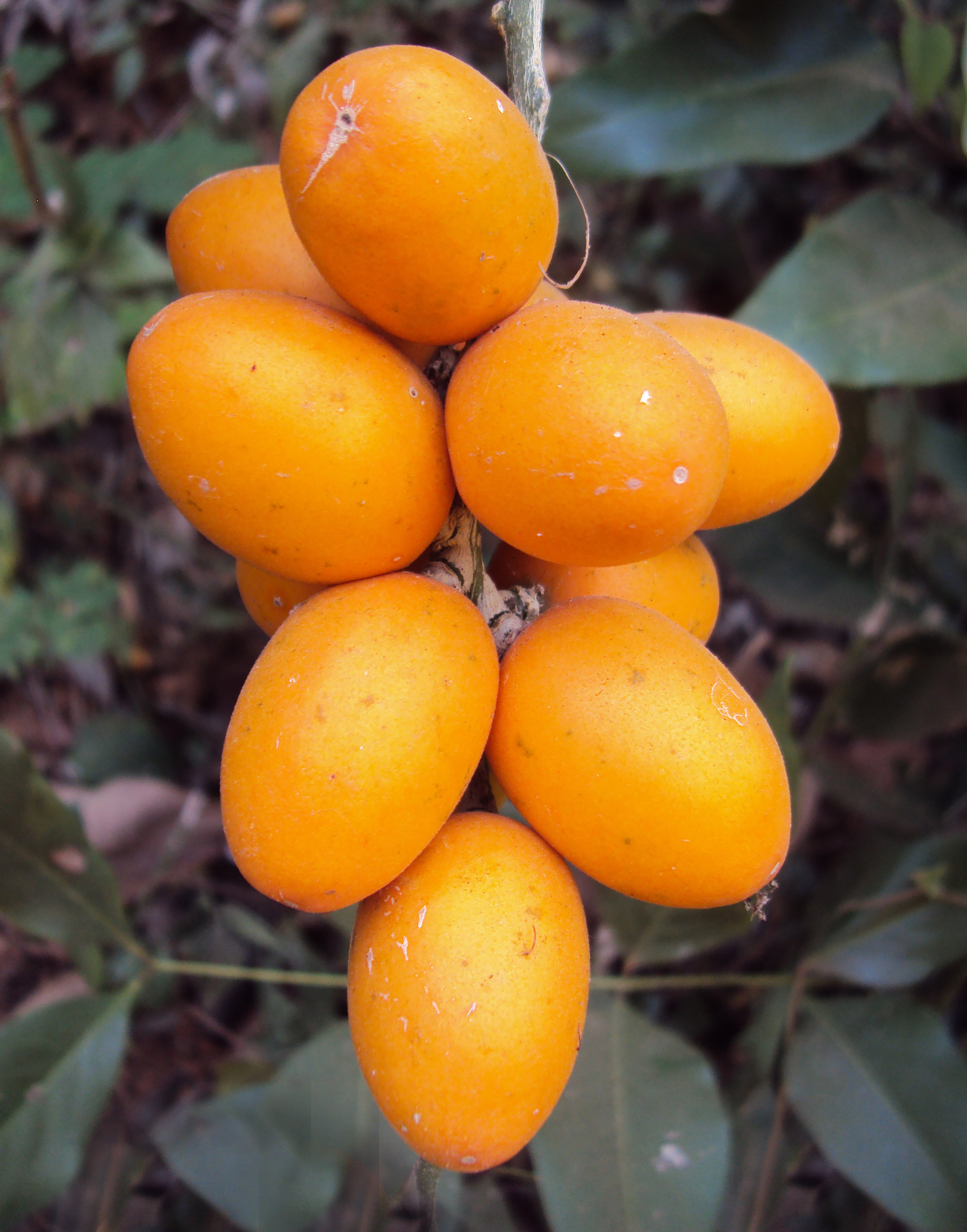
- Sarcostigma kleinii fruits

Scientific classification
- Kingdom: Plantae
- Clade: Tracheophytes
- Clade: Angiosperms
- Clade: Eudicots
- Clade: Asterids
- Order: Icacinales
- Family: Icacinaceae
- Genus: Sarcostigma; Wight & Arn.

= Sarcostigma =

Genus of plant in the family Icacinaceae

Sarcostigma is a genus of plants of the family Icacinaceae. It includes two species of climbers native to tropical Asia. The genus was described by Robert Wight and George A. Walker Arnott and published in Edinburgh New Philosophical Journal in the year 1833.

== Species ==
Two species are accepted.

- Sarcostigma kleinii Wight & Arn.
- Sarcostigma paniculatum Pierre
