= Merrilliodendron =

Conservation status
- Least Concern (IUCN 3.1)

Scientific classification
- Kingdom: Plantae
- Clade: Tracheophytes
- Clade: Angiosperms
- Clade: Eudicots
- Clade: Asterids
- Order: Icacinales
- Family: Icacinaceae
- Genus: Merrilliodendron; Kaneh.
- Species: M. megacarpum

Binomial name
- Merrilliodendron megacarpum (Hemsl.) Sleumer

Synonyms
- Mangifera xylocarpa Lauterb.; Merrilliodendron rotense Kaneh.; Peekeliodendron missionariorum Sleumer; Stemonurus megacarpus Hemsl.

Species of flowering plant

Merrilliodendron is a monotypic genus of flowering plants belonging to the family Icacinaceae. It has a synonym of Peekeliodendron Sleumer. The only species is Merrilliodendron megacarpum (Hemsl.) Sleumer

Its native range is Central Malesia to western Pacific. It is found in the Bismarck Archipelago, the Caroline Islands, Marianas, New Guinea, Philippines, the Santa Cruz Islands, the Solomon Islands and Sulawesi.

The genus name of Merrilliodendron is in honour of Elmer Drew Merrill (1876–1956), an American botanist and taxonomist, and also 'dendron' meaning tree. The Latin specific epithet of megacarpum is derived from the Greek word megacarpus meaning 'with big fruit'. The genus was first described and published in Bot. Mag. (Tokyo) Vol.48 on page 920 in 1934, and then the species was first described and published in Notizbl. Bot. Gart. Berlin-Dahlem Vol.15 on page 243 in 1940.

== Gallery ==
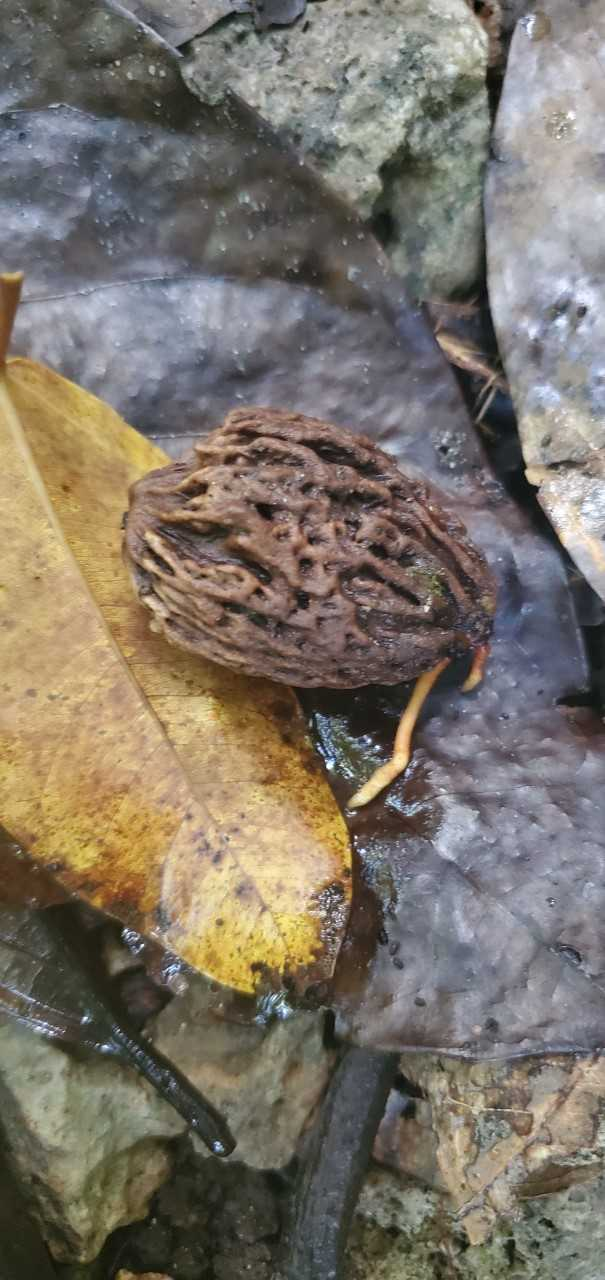
Seeds with root. Hilaan, Dededo, Guam
