= Vadensea =

Scientific classification
- Kingdom: Plantae
- Clade: Tracheophytes
- Clade: Angiosperms
- Clade: Eudicots
- Clade: Asterids
- Order: Icacinales
- Family: Icacinaceae
- Genus: Vadensea; Jongkind & O.Lachenaud

Genus of flowering plants

Vadensea is a genus of flowering plants belonging to the family Icacinaceae.

Its native range is Tanzania to Southern Africa.

Species:

- Vadensea oblongifolia (Engl.) Jongkind & O.Lachenaud
- Vadensea tenuifolia (Oliv.) Jongkind & O.Lachenaud
- Vadensea testui Jongkind & O.Lachenaud
- Vadensea vogelii (Miers) Jongkind & O.Lachenaud
