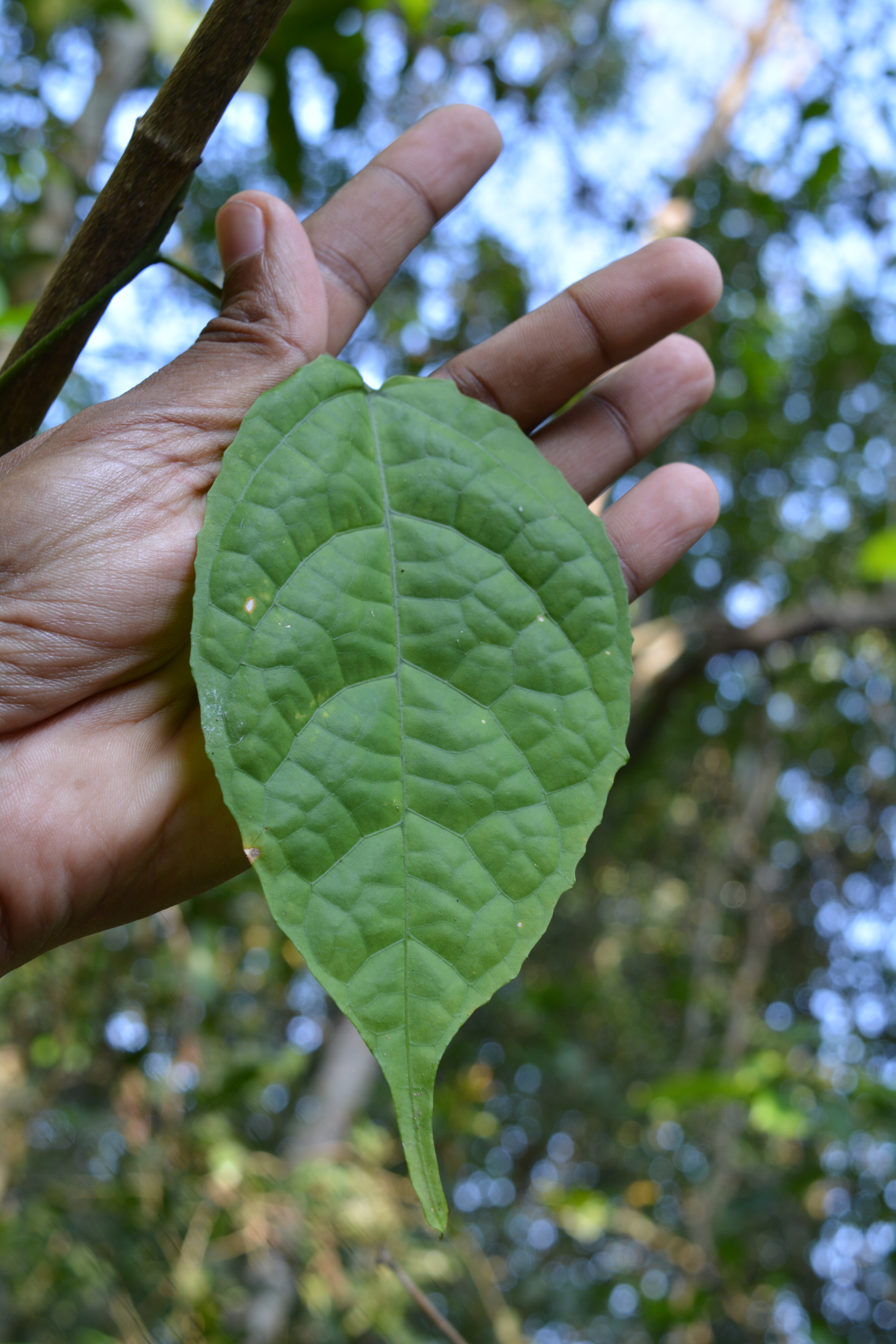
- Miquelia dentata

Scientific classification
- Kingdom: Plantae
- Clade: Tracheophytes
- Clade: Angiosperms
- Clade: Eudicots
- Clade: Asterids
- Order: Icacinales
- Family: Icacinaceae
- Genus: Miquelia; Meisn.

Species
- Miquelia assamica (Griff.) Mast. ex B.D.Jacks.; Miquelia caudata King; Miquelia celebica Blume; Miquelia dentata Bedd.; Miquelia kleinii Meisn.; Miquelia paniculata Gagnep.; Miquelia philippinensis Merr.; Miquelia reticulata Merr.; Miquelia thorelii Gagnep.; Miquelia umbellata Gagnep.

= Miquelia =

Genus of flowering plants

Miquelia is a genus of plants in the family Icacinaceae found in tropical India, Southeast Asia, and the Philippines.

The genus was circumscribed by Carl Meissner in Pl. Vasc. Gen. vol.1 on page 152 in 1838. The name Miquelia is in honour of Dutch botanist Friedrich Anton Wilhelm Miquel (1811–1871), whose main focus of study was the flora of the Dutch East Indies.

== Species ==
Species accepted by Plants of the World Online:

- Miquelia assamica (Griff.) Mast. ex B.D.Jacks.
- Miquelia caudata King
- Miquelia celebica Blume
- Miquelia dentata Bedd.
- Miquelia kleinii Meisn.
- Miquelia paniculata Gagnep.
- Miquelia philippinensis Merr.
- Miquelia reticulata Merr.
- Miquelia thorelii Gagnep.
- Miquelia umbellata Gagnep.
