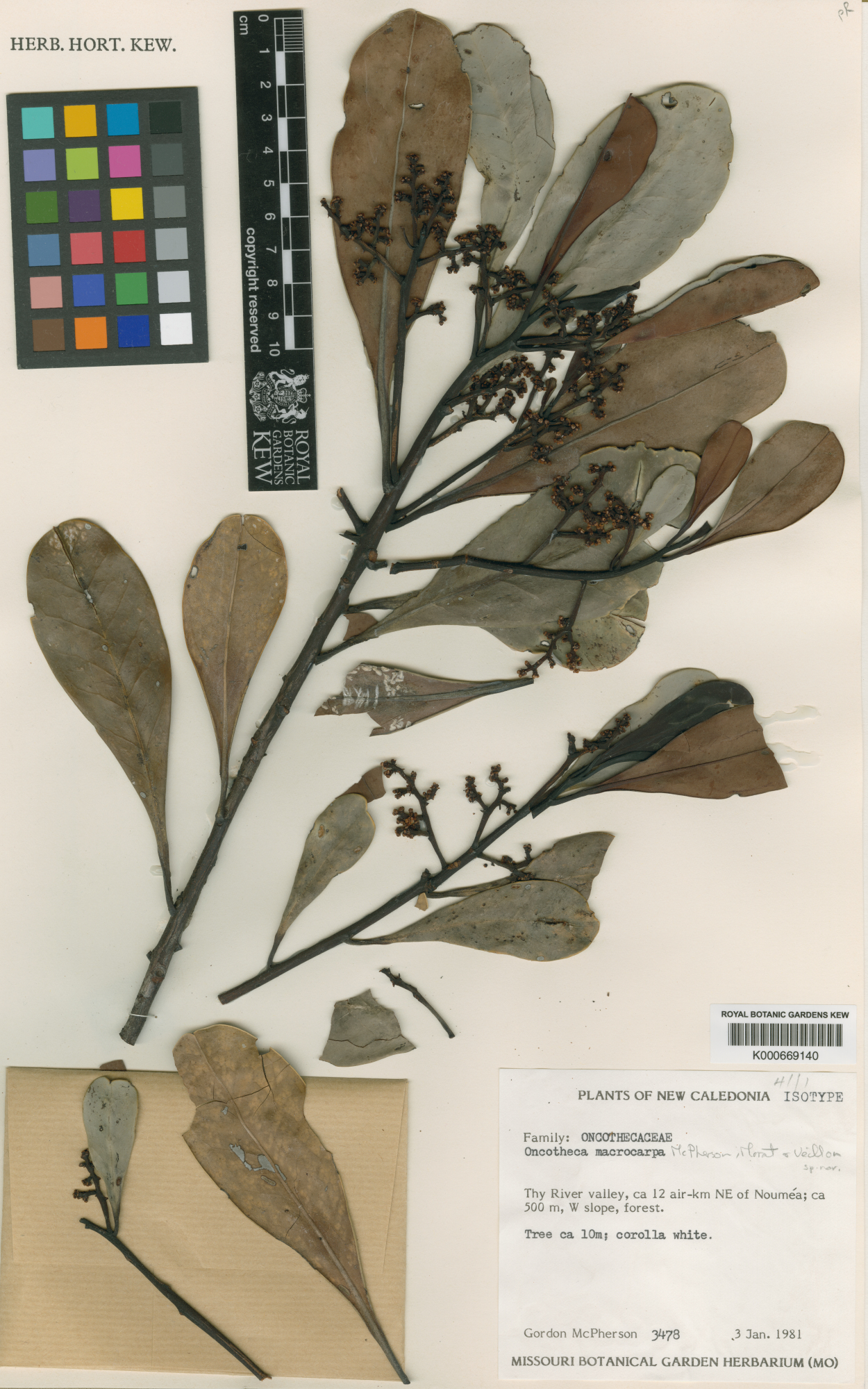

Conservation status
- Least Concern (IUCN 3.1)

Scientific classification
- Kingdom: Plantae
- Clade: Embryophytes
- Clade: Tracheophytes
- Clade: Spermatophytes
- Clade: Angiosperms
- Clade: Eudicots
- Clade: Asterids
- Order: Icacinales
- Family: Oncothecaceae
- Genus: Oncotheca
- Species: O. humboldtiana

Binomial name
- Oncotheca humboldtiana (Guillaumin) Morat & Veillon

Synonyms
- Elaeodendron humboldtianum Guillaumin; Oncotheca macrocarpa McPherson, Morat & Veillon

= Oncotheca humboldtiana =

Species of flowering plant

Oncotheca humboldtiana is a species of small tree in the family Oncothecaceae. It is endemic to New Caledonia. The species was described in 1988.

Oncotheca humboldtiana is one of two members of the family Oncothecaceae. It is of Least Concern.

== Distribution ==
The species is native to the humid forests of west-central and south-east New Caledonia. It is widespread on Grande Terre. The species occurs at altitudes of 20–900 metres (66–2,953 ft).

== Taxonomy ==
The species was named by Philippe Morat and Jean-Marie Veillon in 1988. The name was published in Flore de la Nouvelle-Calédonie.

The species is one of two members of the family Oncothecaceae. The family is endemic to New Caledonia.

== Conservation ==
In 2017, the IUCN assessed Oncotheca humboldtiana as Least Concern. Some subpopulations may be affected by mining. The species is not legally protected, but occurs in procted areas, including Mont Panié.
