= Oncotheca balansae =

Conservation status
- Least Concern (IUCN 3.1)

Scientific classification
- Kingdom: Plantae
- Clade: Embryophytes
- Clade: Tracheophytes
- Clade: Spermatophytes
- Clade: Angiosperms
- Clade: Eudicots
- Clade: Asterids
- Order: Icacinales
- Family: Oncothecaceae
- Genus: Oncotheca
- Species: O. balansae

Binomial name
- Oncotheca balansae Baill.

Species of plant

Oncotheca balansae is a species of plant in the family Oncothecaceae. It is endemic to New Caledonia. It is a tree and primarily grows in the wet tropical biome. The species was named in 1891, by Henri Ernest Baillon.
