= Natsiatopsis =

Scientific classification
- Kingdom: Plantae
- Clade: Tracheophytes
- Clade: Angiosperms
- Clade: Eudicots
- Clade: Asterids
- Order: Icacinales
- Family: Icacinaceae
- Genus: Natsiatopsis; Kurz
- Species: N. thunbergiifolia

Binomial name
- Natsiatopsis thunbergiifolia Kurz

Genus of plants

Natsiatopsis is a monotypic genus of flowering plants belonging to the family Icacinaceae. The only species is Natsiatopsis thunbergiifolia.

Its native range is Eastern Himalaya to Southern Central China.
