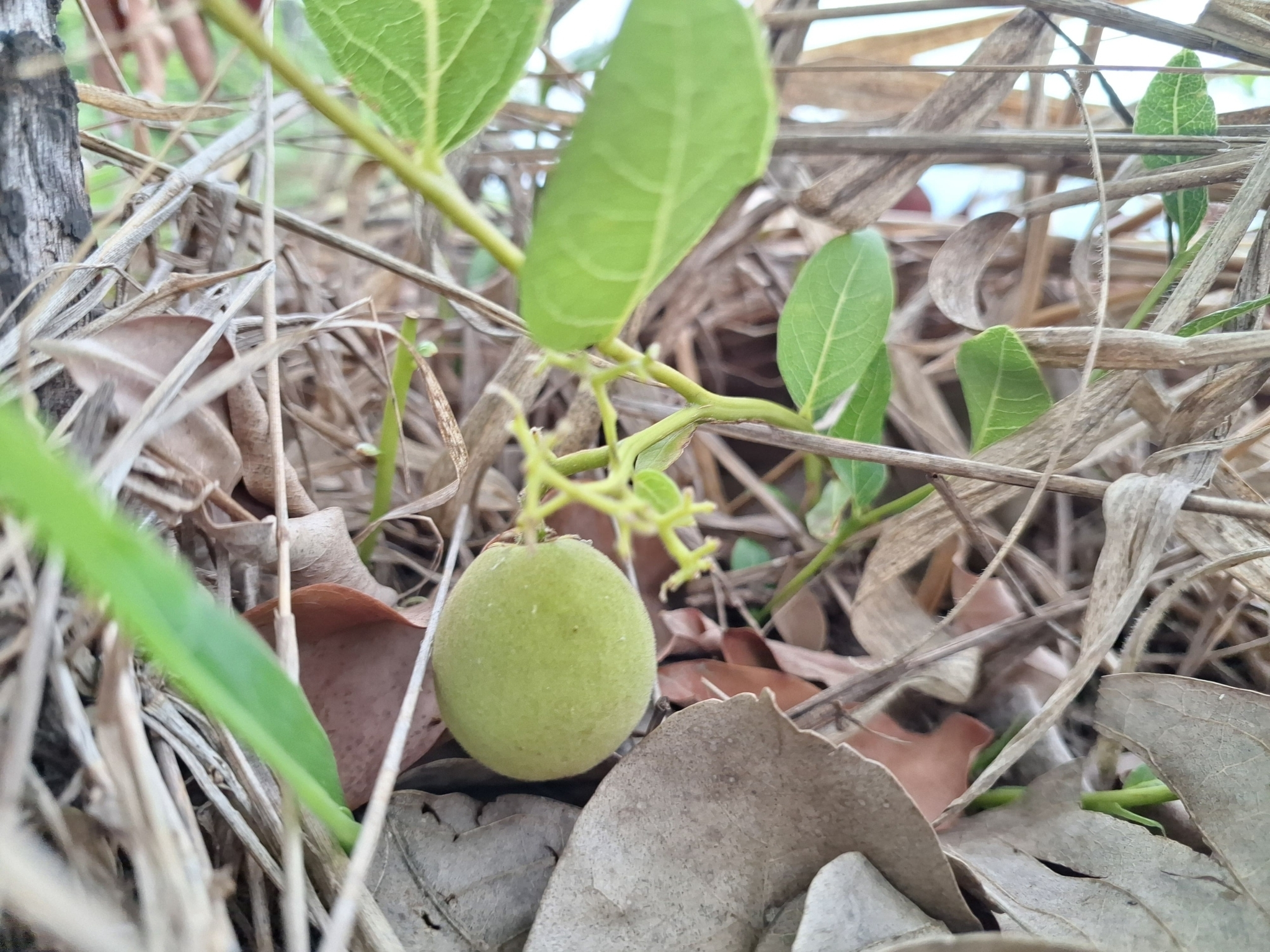
- Casimirella diversifolia

Scientific classification
- Kingdom: Plantae
- Clade: Tracheophytes
- Clade: Angiosperms
- Clade: Eudicots
- Clade: Asterids
- Order: Icacinales
- Family: Icacinaceae
- Genus: Casimirella; Hassl.

= Casimirella =

Genus of flowering plants

Casimirella is a genus of flowering plants belonging to the family Icacinaceae.

Its native range is southern tropical America.

Species:

- Casimirella ampla (Miers) R.A.Howard
- Casimirella beckii (Fern.Casas) Breteler
- Casimirella crispula (R.A.Howard) R.A.Howard
- Casimirella diversifolia R.A.Howard
- Casimirella guaranitica Hassl.
- Casimirella lanata R.A.Howard
- Casimirella rupestris (Ducke) R.A.Howard
