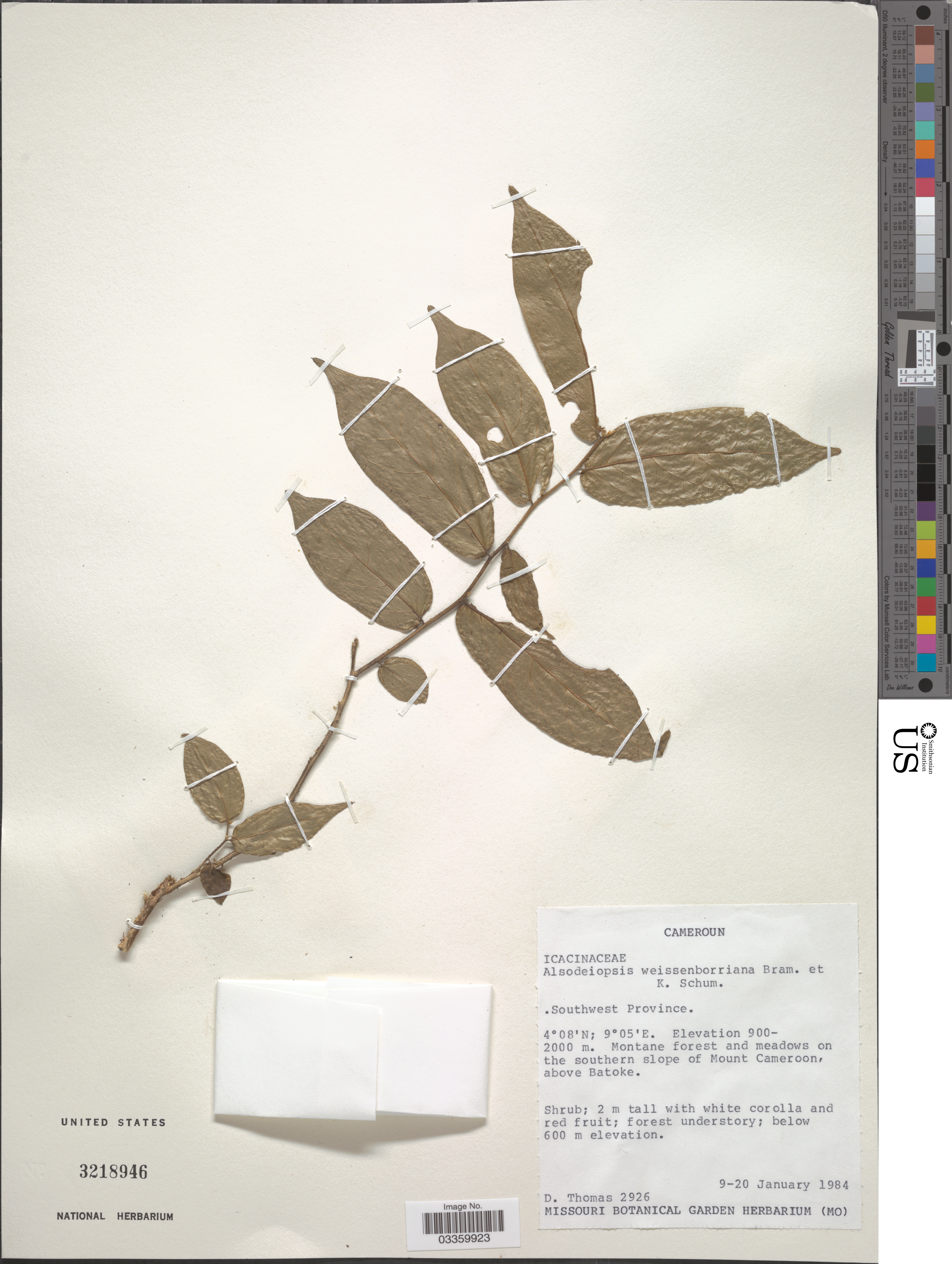

Scientific classification
- Kingdom: Plantae
- Clade: Tracheophytes
- Clade: Angiosperms
- Clade: Eudicots
- Clade: Asterids
- Order: Icacinales
- Family: Icacinaceae
- Genus: Alsodeiopsis; Oliver

= Alsodeiopsis =

Genus of flowering plants

Alsodeiopsis Oliver is a genus of plants in the family Icacinaceae native to tropical Africa. There are about 11 species. Seventeen species names have been published in Alsodeiopsis, but many of these are synonyms. The type species, Alsodeiopsis mannii was named by Daniel Oliver in 1869.

Alsodeiopsis zenkeri is a rheophyte.

== Species ==
1. Alsodeiopsis chippii Hutch., Accepted
2. Alsodeiopsis chippii subsp. rubra (Engl.) Govaerts, Accepted
3. Alsodeiopsis chippii subsp. villosa (Keay) Govaerts, Accepted
4. Alsodeiopsis mannii Oliv., Accepted
5. Alsodeiopsis poggei Engl., Accepted
6. Alsodeiopsis rowlandii Engl., Accepted
7. Alsodeiopsis schumannii (Engl.) Engl., Accepted
8. Alsodeiopsis staudtii Engl., Accepted
9. Alsodeiopsis tessmannii Engl., Accepted
10. Alsodeiopsis zenkeri Engl., Accepted
11. Alsodeiopsis laurentii De Wild., Unresolved
12. Alsodeiopsis weissenborriana Bramw. & Schumann, Unresolved

Synonyms:

1. Alsodeiopsis bequaertii De Wild. = Alsodeiopsis rowlandii Engl.
2. Alsodeiopsis glaberrima Engl. ex Hutch. & Dalziel = Olax gambecola Baill.
3. Alsodeiopsis holstii Engl. = Leptaulus holstii (Engl.) Engl.
4. Alsodeiopsis oblongifolia Engl. = Desmostachys oblongifolius (Engl.) Villiers
5. Alsodeiopsis rubra Engl. = Alsodeiopsis chippii subsp. rubra (Engl.) Govaerts
6. Alsodeiopsis villosa Keay = Alsodeiopsis chippii subsp. villosa (Keay) Govaerts
7. Alsodeiopsis weissenborniana J.Braun & K.Schum. = Alsodeiopsis mannii Oliv.
