= Syzygium parameswaranii =

Conservation status
- Endangered (IUCN 3.1)

Scientific classification
- Kingdom: Plantae
- Clade: Tracheophytes
- Clade: Angiosperms
- Clade: Eudicots
- Clade: Rosids
- Order: Myrtales
- Family: Myrtaceae
- Genus: Syzygium
- Species: S. parameswaranii

Binomial name
- Syzygium parameswaranii M.Mohanan & A.N.Henry

Species of flowering plant

Syzygium parameswaranii is a species of flowering plant in the family Myrtaceae. It is a tree native to Kerala and Tamil Nadu in southwestern India. It is a small evergreen tree which grows up to 6 metres tall.

Syzygium parameswaranii is endemic to the southern Western Ghats, where it is known from the Agasthyamalai, Periyar, and Megamalai landscapes. It grows in montane evergreen shola forest patches from 1,200 to 1,800 metres elevation. Associated tree species include Elaeocarpus munroi, Maesa indica, Mappia nimmoniana, Syzygium spp., and Litsea spp.
