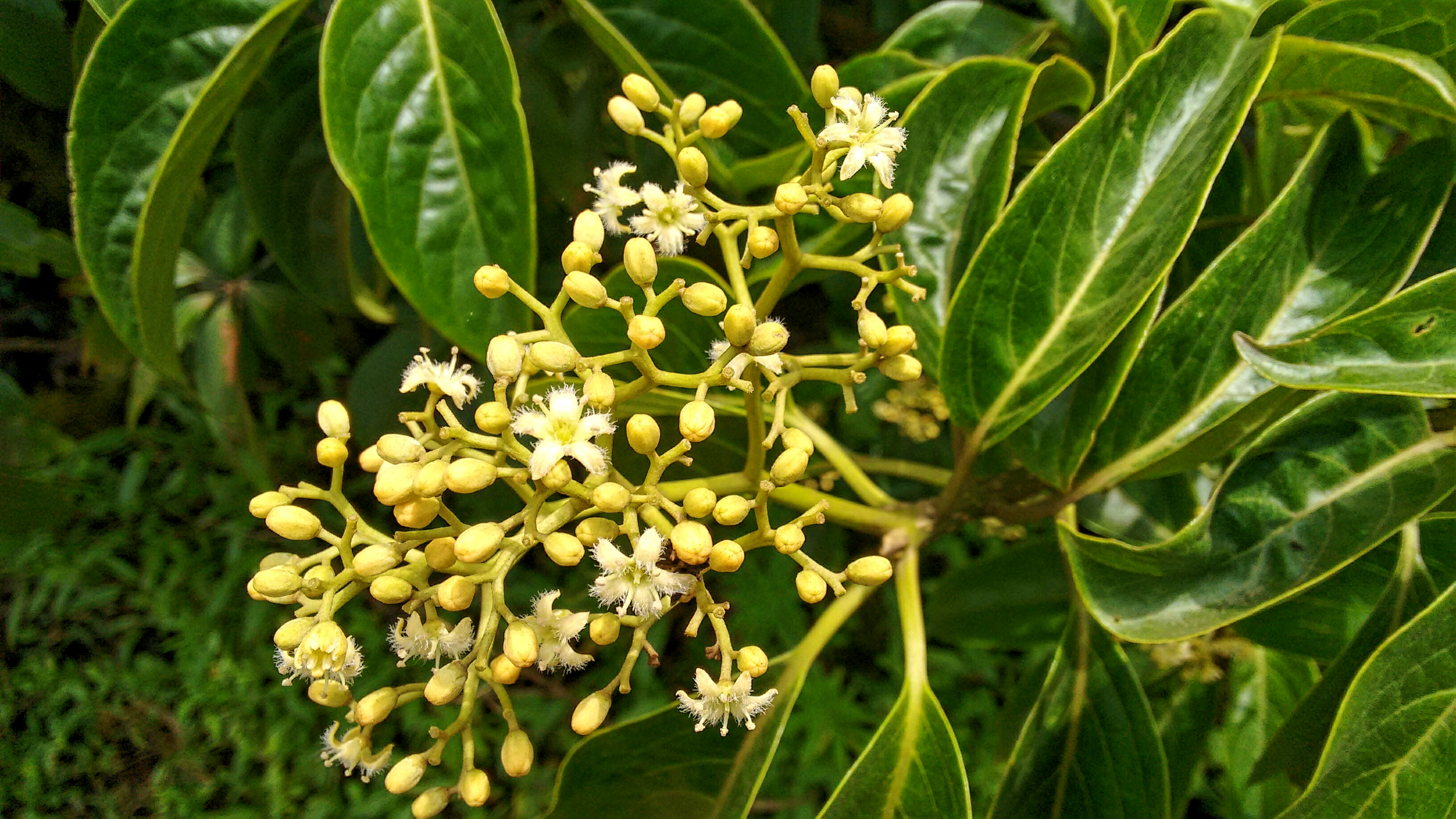
- Mappia foetida

Scientific classification
- Kingdom: Plantae
- Clade: Tracheophytes
- Clade: Angiosperms
- Clade: Eudicots
- Clade: Asterids
- Order: Icacinales
- Family: Icacinaceae
- Genus: Mappia; Jacq.

= Mappia =

Genus of flowering plants

Mappia is a genus of shrubs in the family Icacinaceae. There are eleven species (including Nothapodytes Blume) occurring in Central America, the West Indies and Asia. The type species for the genus is Mappia racemosa Jacquin. Some research has been shown that it has an effective anti cancer property against breast cancer .

Leretia cordata has been included in Mappia by some authors. The name "Mappia" has been used for Cunila and for Doliocarpus guianensis (synonym: Soramia guianensis). Both of these uses of the name "Mappia" are nomina rejecta.

== Alkaloids ==
Mappia foetida contains the alkaloid Mappicine [54318-59-1].

Mappicine

9-Methoxycamptothecin [39026-92-1] is a minor constituent of Mappia foetida Miers.
