= Stachyanthus =

Scientific classification
- Kingdom: Plantae
- Clade: Tracheophytes
- Clade: Angiosperms
- Clade: Eudicots
- Clade: Asterids
- Order: Icacinales
- Family: Icacinaceae
- Genus: Stachyanthus; Engl.

Genus of plants

Stachyanthus is a genus of plants in the family Icacinaceae. It has about four species.

== List of selected species ==
- Stachyanthus cuneatus Engl.
- Stachyanthus donisii (Boutique) Boutique
- Stachyanthus occidentalis (Keay & J.Miège) Boutique
- Stachyanthus zenkeri Engl.
