= Ryticaryum =

Scientific classification
- Kingdom: Plantae
- Clade: Tracheophytes
- Clade: Angiosperms
- Clade: Eudicots
- Clade: Asterids
- Order: Icacinales
- Family: Icacinaceae
- Genus: Ryticaryum; Becc.

Synonyms
- Pocillaria; Rhyticaryum; Rhytidocaryum

Genus of plants

Ryticaryum is a genus of flowering plants belonging to the family Icacinaceae. They are dioecious shrubs or small trees.

Its native range is Eastern Malesia to Northern Queensland.

Species:

- Ryticaryum elegans G.Schellenb.
- Ryticaryum fasciculatum Becc.
- Ryticaryum gracile G.Schellenb.
- Ryticaryum longifolium K.Schum. & Lauterb.
- Ryticaryum lucidum G.Schellenb.
- Ryticaryum macrocarpum Becc.
- Ryticaryum novoguineense (Warb.) Sleumer
- Ryticaryum oleraceum Becc.
- Ryticaryum oxycarpum K.Schum. & Lauterb.
- Ryticaryum purpurascens G.Schellenb.
- Ryticaryum racemosum Becc.
- Ryticaryum rotundatum G.Schellenb.
