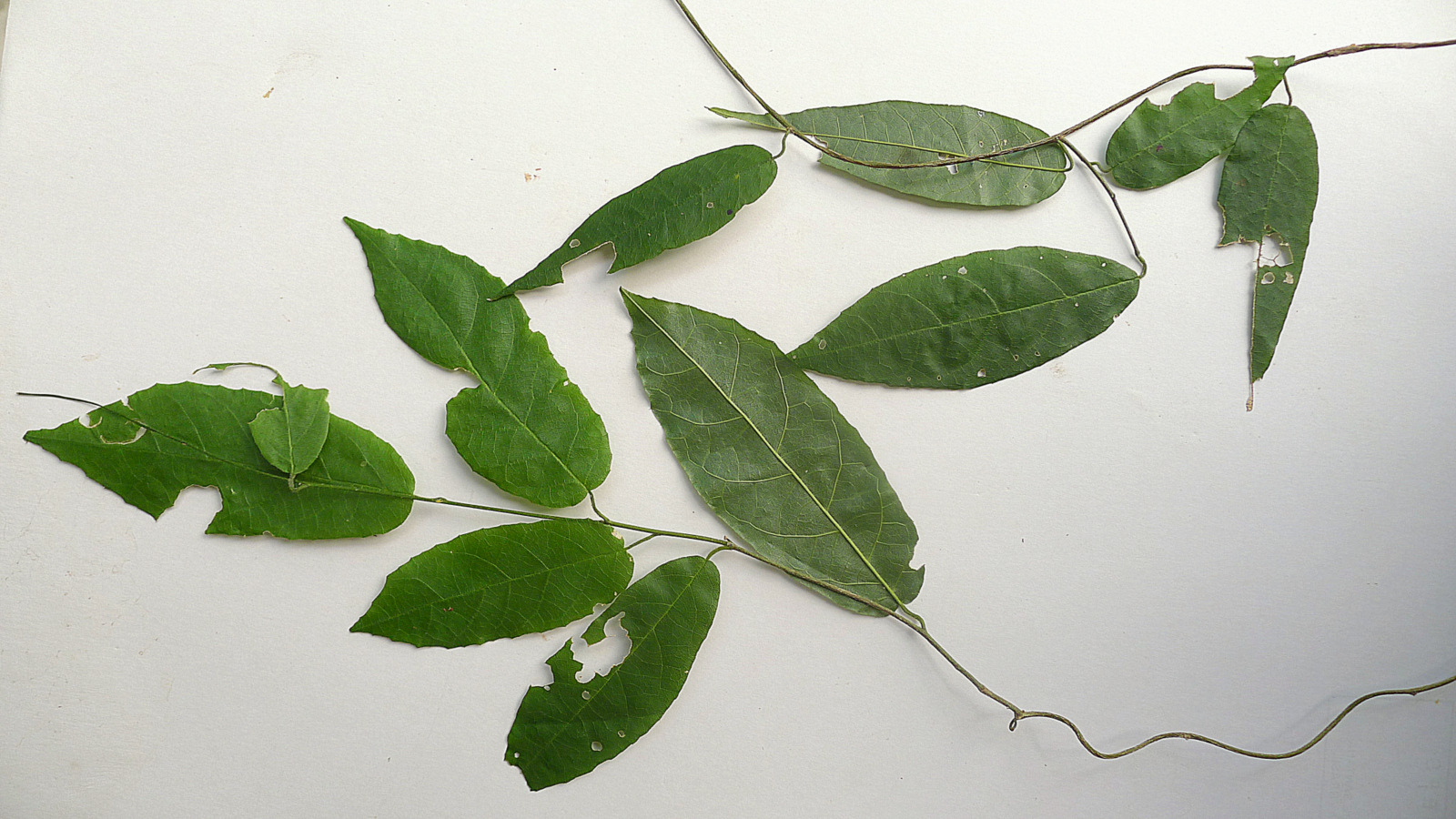
- Pleurisanthes parviflora

Scientific classification
- Kingdom: Plantae
- Clade: Tracheophytes
- Clade: Angiosperms
- Clade: Eudicots
- Clade: Asterids
- Order: Icacinales
- Family: Icacinaceae
- Genus: Pleurisanthes; Baill.

= Pleurisanthes =

Genus of flowering plants

Pleurisanthes is a genus of flowering plants belonging to the family Icacinaceae.

Its native range is Southern Tropical America.

Species:

- Pleurisanthes artocarpi Baill.
- Pleurisanthes brasiliensis (Valeton) Tiegh.
- Pleurisanthes emarginata Tiegh.
- Pleurisanthes flava Sandwith
- Pleurisanthes howardii R.Duno, Riina & P.E.Berry
- Pleurisanthes parviflora (Ducke) R.A.Howard
- Pleurisanthes simpliciflora Sleumer
