= Sleumeria =

Scientific classification
- Kingdom: Plantae
- Clade: Tracheophytes
- Clade: Angiosperms
- Clade: Eudicots
- Clade: Asterids
- Order: Icacinales
- Family: Icacinaceae
- Genus: Sleumeria; Utteridge, Nagam. & Teo

Genus of plants

Sleumeria is a genus of flowering plants belonging to the family Icacinaceae.

Its native range is Borneo.

Species:

- Sleumeria auriculata Utteridge, Nagam. & Teo
