= Leretia =

Conservation status
- Least Concern (IUCN 3.1)

Scientific classification
- Kingdom: Plantae
- Clade: Tracheophytes
- Clade: Angiosperms
- Clade: Eudicots
- Clade: Asterids
- Order: Icacinales
- Family: Icacinaceae
- Genus: Leretia; Vell.
- Species: L. cordata

Binomial name
- Leretia cordata Vell.

Synonyms
- Icacina poeppigiana (Baill.) Valeton; Leretia glabrata Sleumer; Leretia nitida Miers; Leretia poeppigiana (Baill.) Sleumer; Leretia vellozoi Miers; Mappia cordata (Vell.) Engl.; Mappia glabrata (Sleumer) Sleumer; Mappia nitida (Miers) Engl.; Mappia poeppigiana Baill.

Genus of plants

Leretia is a monotypic genus of flowering plants belonging to the family Icacinaceae. The only species is Leretia cordata Vell.

Its native range is Costa Rica to southern Tropical America. It is also found in the countries of Bolivia, Brazil, Colombia, Costa Rica, Ecuador, French Guiana, Guyana, Panamá, Peru, Suriname and Venezuela.

The genus name of Leretia is in honour of Jean de Léry (1536–1613), an explorer, writer and Reformed pastor born in Lamargelle, Côte-d'Or, France. The Latin specific epithet of cordata is derived from cordatus meaning heart-shaped or cordate. Both genus and species were first described and published in Fl. Flumin. on page 99 in 1829.
