= Gonocaryum =

Scientific classification
- Kingdom: Plantae
- Clade: Tracheophytes
- Clade: Angiosperms
- Clade: Eudicots
- Clade: Asterids
- Order: Aquifoliales
- Family: Cardiopteridaceae
- Genus: Gonocaryum; Miq.

Type species
- Gonocaryum gracile Miq.

Genus of plants

Gonocaryum is a genus of plants in the family Cardiopteridaceae described as a genus in 1861.

Gonocaryum is native to Southeast Asia, southern China, and Papuasia.

Species

- Gonocaryum calleryanum - Taiwan, Philippines, Sulawesi, Borneo, Maluku
- Gonocaryum cognatum - Borneo, Philippines
- Gonocaryum crassifolium - Selangor
- Gonocaryum gracile - Sumatra, Peninsular Malaysia
- Gonocaryum impressinervium - Borneo
- Gonocaryum litorale - Lesser Sunda Islands, Maluku, Sulawesi, New Guinea, Bismarck Archipelago
- Gonocaryum lobbianum - Hainan, Indochina, Borneo, Malaysia
- Gonocaryum macrophyllum - Berhala, Jarak, Sumatra, Borneo
- Gonocaryum minus - Sabah
- Gonocaryum poilanei - Vietnam
- Gonocaryum sleumeri - Vietnam

formerly included

Gonocaryum sinense - Osmanthus marginatus
