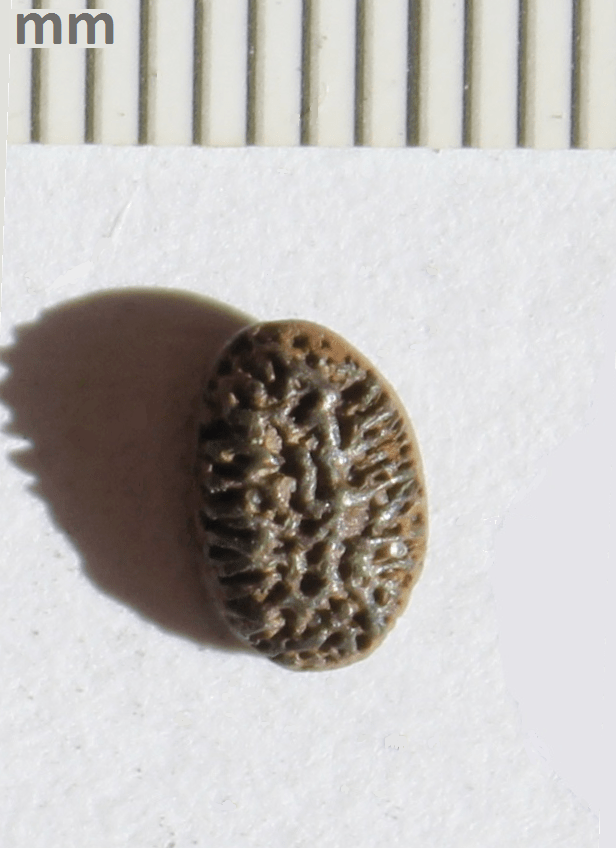
- Fossil Iodes seed, London Clay Formation

Scientific classification
- Kingdom: Plantae
- Clade: Tracheophytes
- Clade: Angiosperms
- Clade: Eudicots
- Clade: Asterids
- Order: Icacinales
- Family: Icacinaceae
- Genus: Iodes; Blume

= Iodes =

Genus of plants

Iodes is a genus of flowering plants belonging to the family Icacinaceae.

Its native range is Tropical Africa, Madagascar, Tropical and Subtropical Asia.

Species:

- Iodes africana Welw. ex Oliv.
- Iodes cirrhosa Turcz.
- Iodes globulifera H.Perrier
- Iodes kamerunensis Engl.
- Iodes klaineana Pierre
- Iodes liberica Stapf
- Iodes madagascariensis Baill.
- Iodes nectarifera H.Perrier
- Iodes ovalis Blume
- Iodes perrieri Sleumer
- Iodes philippinensis Merr.
- Iodes pierlotii Boutique
- Iodes reticulata King
- Iodes scandens (Becc.) Utteridge & Byng
- Iodes seguinii (H.Lév.) Rehder
- Iodes seretii (De Wild.) Boutique
- Iodes usambarensis Sleumer
- Iodes velutina King
- Iodes vitiginea (Hance) Hance
- Iodes yangambiensis Louis ex Boutique
- Iodes yatesii Merr.
