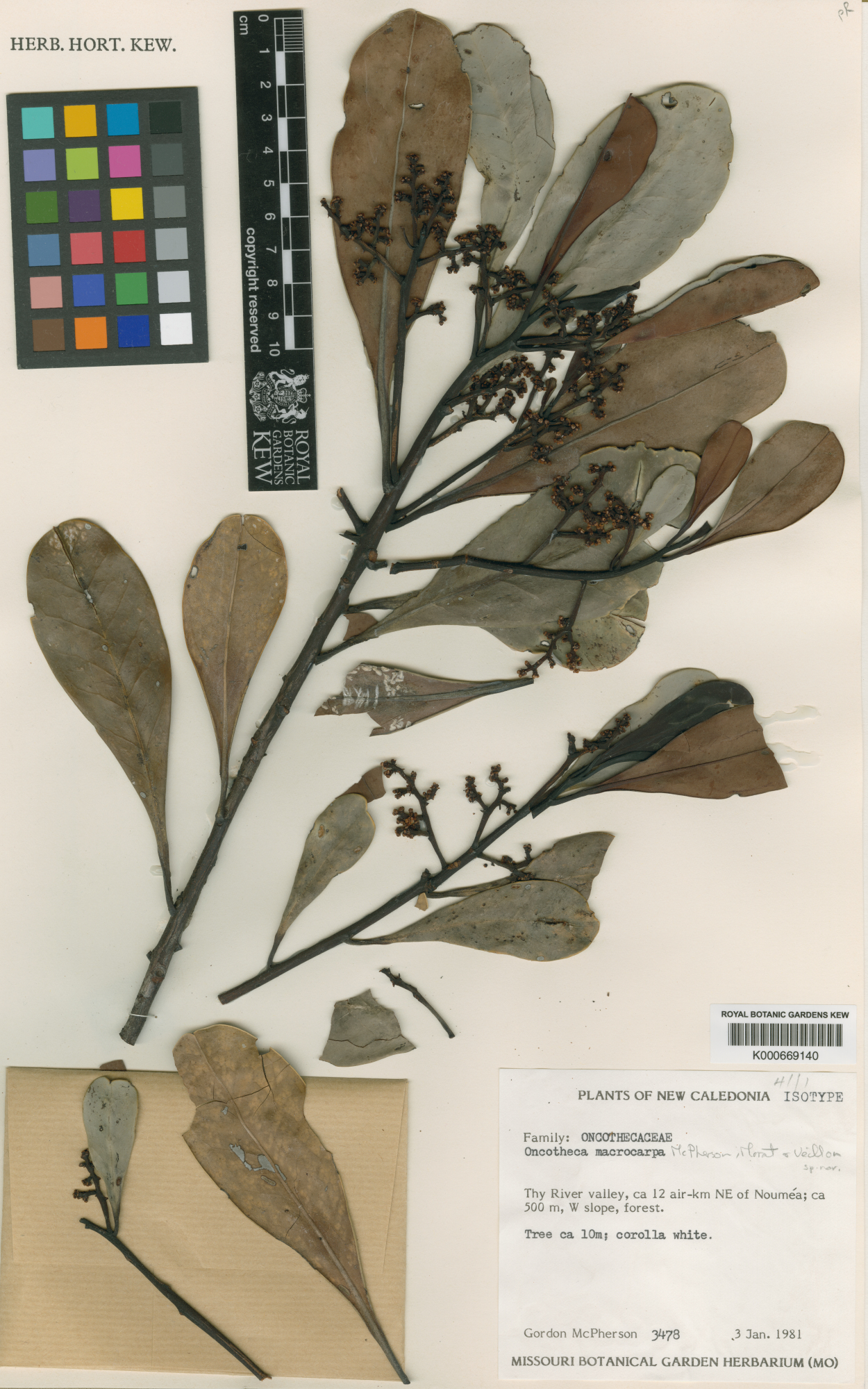
- Oncotheca humboldtiana herbarium specimen

Scientific classification
- Kingdom: Plantae
- Clade: Tracheophytes
- Clade: Angiosperms
- Clade: Eudicots
- Clade: Asterids
- Order: Oncothecales
- Family: Oncothecaceae; Kobuski ex Airy Shaw
- Genus: Oncotheca; Baill.

Species
- Oncotheca balansae Baill.; Oncotheca humboldtiana (Guillaumin) Morat & Veillon

= Oncotheca =

Genus of trees

Oncotheca is a genus of tree endemic to New Caledonia. There are two species, Oncotheca balansae and Oncotheca humboldtiana. Oncotheca is the sole genus of the Oncothecaceae, which is one of three families of flowering plants endemic to New Caledonia, and the only family of the order Oncothecales. Its placement has been enigmatic for a long time, but a recent phylogenetic analysis based on 73 plastid genes found it to be sister to Icacinaceae.

Oncotheca species are characterised by small, crescent-shaped trees or shrubs with leathery leaves clustered near the ends of their branches. Their flowers grow in branched clusters, while their fruits are flattened drupes containing thick-walled, five-chambered stones with two to five seeds. Oncotheca balansae was first described by Henri Baillon in 1891.

== Structure ==
Oncotheca balansae was first described by Henri Baillon in 1891 and is native to the north and southeast of New Caledonia, growing mainly in wet tropical forest. The genus consists of small, crescent-shaped trees or shrubs with leathery evergreen leaves crowded toward the branch tips. The leaves are simple, entire and lack stipules, and the flowers are borne in branched clusters. Each flower has a superior ovary of five cells.

The fruit is a flattened drupe with thin flesh and a very thick-walled, five-chambered stone, holding two to five seeds with abundant endosperm. Cronquist placed the family in Theales. APG III left it unplaced, and APG IV placed it in Icacinales. In 2026, APG V recognised Oncothecales as a new order containing only Oncothecaceae, restricting Icacinales to Icacinaceae.
