= Friedrich Anton Wilhelm Miquel =

Dutch botanist (1811–1871)

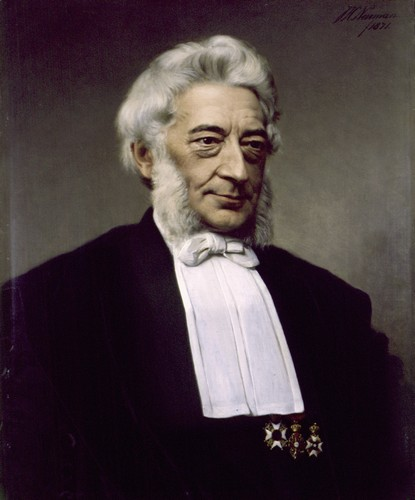
- Born: 24 October 1811; Neuenhaus, present-day Germany
- Died: 23 January 1871 (aged 59); Utrecht, Netherlands
- Scientific career
- Fields: Botany
- Author abbrev. (botany): Miq.

Friedrich Anton Wilhelm Miquel (24 October 1811 – 23 January 1871) was a Dutch botanist whose main focus of study was on the flora of the Dutch East Indies.

== Early life ==
Miquel was born in Neuenhaus and studied medicine at the University of Groningen, where, in 1833, he received his doctorate. After starting work as a doctor at the Buitengasthuis Hospital in Amsterdam, in 1835, he taught medicine at the clinical school in Rotterdam. In 1838 he became correspondent of the Royal Institute, which later became the Royal Netherlands Academy of Arts and Sciences, and in 1846 he became member. He was professor of botany at the University of Amsterdam (1846–1859) and Utrecht University (1859–1871). He directed the Rijksherbarium (National Herbarium) at Leiden from 1862. In 1866, he was elected a foreign member of the Royal Swedish Academy of Sciences.

== Research ==
Miquel did research on the taxonomy of plants. He was interested in the flora of the Dutch Empire, specifically the Dutch East Indies and Suriname. Although he never traveled far, he knew through correspondence a large collection of Australian and Indian plants. He described many species and genera in important families like Casuarinaceae, Myrtaceae, Piperaceae and Polygonaceae. In total, he has published some 7,000 botanical names. Through his partnership with the German botanist Heinrich Göppert, he became interested in paleobotany, the study of fossil plants, notably the fossil Cycads. Along with Jacob Gijsbertus Samuël van Breda, Pieter Harting and Winand Staring, he was in the first commission to create a geological map of the Netherlands, which was published in 1852 by Johan Rudolph Thorbecke.

== Legacy ==
Miquel died in Utrecht at the age of 59 in 1871, after which he was succeeded as the director of the National Herbarium by Willem Frederik Reinier Suringar. From his estate, the Miquel fund was established, which provides financial support to botanists at the University of Utrecht. The former home of the director of the botanical gardens in the city center of Utrecht is called "Miquel's House". In the Laakkwartier district of the Hague is a street named after him.

He is honoured in the naming of two forms of plant taxa; In 1838, botanist Carl Meissner published Miquelia, which is a genus in the flowering plants in the family Icacinaceae. They are found in tropical India, Southeast Asia, and the Philippines. Then in 1980, botanist Fric ex F.Ritter published Miqueliopuntia, which is a genus of cactus from South America.

== Key publications ==
- Genera Cactearum, Rotterdam, 1839
- Monographia Cycadearum, Utrecht, 1842
- Systema Piperacearum, Rotterdam, 1843–1844
- Illustrationes Piperacearum, Bonn, 1847
- Cycadeae quaedam Americanae, partim novae. Amsterdam, 1851.
- Flora Indiae batavae, Amsterdam, 1855–1859
- Leerboek der Artensij-Gewassen, Utrecht, 1859
- De Palmis Archipelagi Indici observationes novae. Amsterdam, 1868.
- Miquel, Friedrich Anton Wilhelm (1865–1869). Annales Musei botanici lugduno-batavi. iii vols. Amsterdam: Rijksherbarium.
