= Natsiatum =

Scientific classification
- Kingdom: Plantae
- Clade: Tracheophytes
- Clade: Angiosperms
- Clade: Eudicots
- Clade: Asterids
- Order: Icacinales
- Family: Icacinaceae
- Genus: Natsiatum; Buch.-Ham. ex [Arn.]]

Genus of plants

Natsiatum is a genus of flowering plants belonging to the family Icacinaceae.

Its native range is the Indian Subcontinent to Southern Central China and Indo-China.

== Species ==
Species:

- Natsiatum herpeticum Buch.-Ham. ex Arn.
