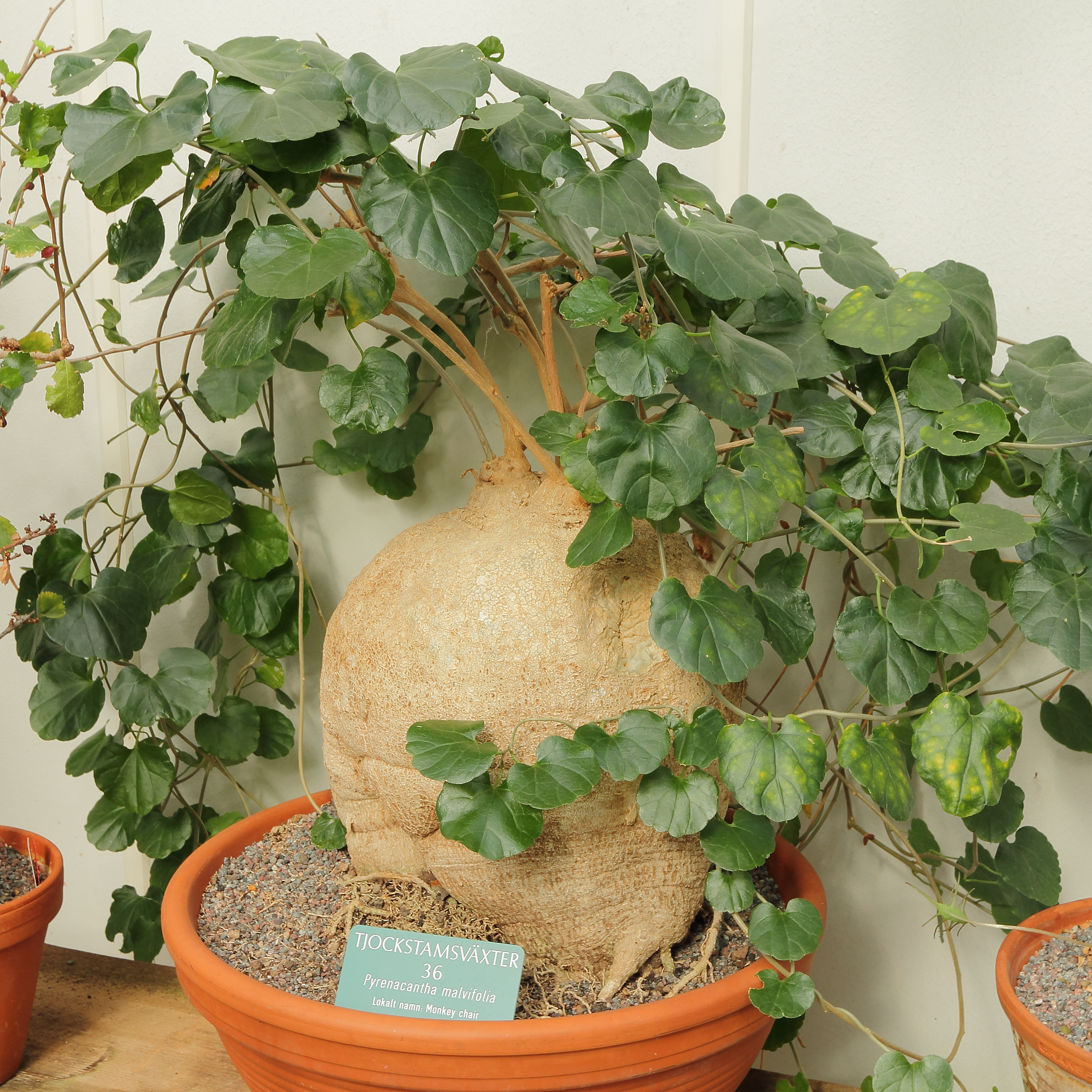
- Pyrenacantha malvifolia

Scientific classification
- Kingdom: Plantae
- Clade: Tracheophytes
- Clade: Angiosperms
- Clade: Eudicots
- Clade: Asterids
- Order: Icacinales
- Family: Icacinaceae
- Genus: Pyrenacantha; Baill.

Synonyms
- Adelanthus Endl.; Cavanilla Thunb.; Endacanthus Baill.; Freeria Merr.; Moldenhauera Spreng.; Monocephalium S.Moore

= Pyrenacantha =

Genus of plants

Pyrenacantha is a genus of plant in family Icacinaceae. It has about 20 species, all from the Old World tropics.

== List of selected species ==
- Pyrenacantha acuminata Engl.
- Pyrenacantha ambrensis Labat, El-Achkar & R.Rabev.
- Pyrenacantha andapensis Labat, El-Achkar & R. Rabev.
- Pyrenacantha brevipes Engl.
- Pyrenacantha capitata H.Perrier
- Pyrenacantha chlorantha Baker
- Pyrenacantha cordicula Villiers
- Pyrenacantha malvifolia Engl.
- Pyrenacantha volubilis William Jackson Hooker, 1830. (type species)
