= Phytocrene =

- Phytocrene macrophylla

Scientific classification
- Kingdom: Plantae
- Clade: Tracheophytes
- Clade: Angiosperms
- Clade: Eudicots
- Clade: Asterids
- Order: Icacinales
- Family: Icacinaceae
- Genus: Phytocrene; Wall.

Genus of plants

Phytocrene is a genus of flowering plants belonging to the family Icacinaceae.

Its native range is Bangladesh to New Guinea.

== Species ==
As of September 2026, Plants of the World Online includes:

1. Phytocrene anomala Merr.
2. Phytocrene borneensis Becc.
3. Phytocrene bracteata Wall.
4. Phytocrene hirsuta Blume
5. Phytocrene integerrima (Blume) Kosterm.
6. Phytocrene interrupta Sleumer
7. Phytocrene macrophylla (Blume) Blume
8. Phytocrene oblonga Wall.
9. Phytocrene palmata Wall.
10. Phytocrene racemosa Sleumer
11. Phytocrene trichura Ridl.
