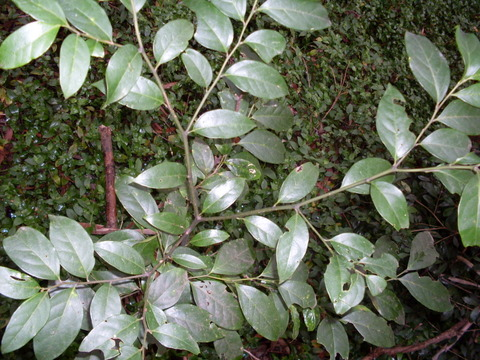
- Citronella moorei

Scientific classification
- Kingdom: Plantae
- Clade: Tracheophytes
- Clade: Angiosperms
- Clade: Eudicots
- Clade: Asterids
- Order: Cardiopteridales
- Family: Cardiopteridaceae; Blume

Genera
- Cardiopteris; Citronella; Gonocaryum; Leptaulus; Pseudobotrys

= Cardiopteridaceae =

Family of flowering plants

Cardiopteridaceae is a eudicot family of flowering plants. It consists of about 43 species of trees, shrubs, and woody vines, mostly of the tropics, but with a few in temperate regions. It contains six genera, the largest of which is Citronella, with 21 species. The other genera are much smaller.

Citronella mucronata is grown as an ornamental for its attractively shiny leaves and fragrant flowers. A tea is made from the leaves of Citronella gongonha which is similar to yerba mate.

The APG V classification (2026) places them in the order Cardiopteridales. This order consists of Cardiopteridaceae and its sister family, Stemonuraceae.

== The family name ==
The family Cardiopteridaceae was established by Carl Ludwig Blume in 1847 when he described the species Cardiopteris moluccana. Blume based his new family on Cardiopteris, a name that had previously been used by John Royle and Nathaniel Wallich, but not validly published. In 1843, Justus Hasskarl had published the name Peripterygium quinqueloba for what is now Cardiopteris quinqueloba. Blume indicated his awareness of Hasskarl's plant and included it as another species of Cardiopteris when he published Cardiopteris moluccana.

A complex nomenclatural dispute ensued and lasted well into the twentieth century. Because the basionym, Cardiopteris, was in question, the corresponding family name Cardiopteridaceae was in question as well. The ICBN finally conserved the name Cardiopteris against Peripterygium.

== Circumscription ==
Prior to the seminal study by Kårehed in 2001, Cardiopteridaceae had consisted of only Cardiopteris. For example, Hermann Sleumer considered it to be monogeneric in his treatment of the family for Die Natürlichen Pflanzenfamilien in 1942. John Hutchinson did likewise in 1973.

In 2001, Icacinaceae was shown to be polyphyletic. It has since been divided into five segregate families: Cardiopteridaceae, Stemonuraceae, Pennantiaceae, Metteniusaceae, and Icacinaceae sensu stricto. Icacinaceae sensu stricto will eventually be divided further.

In the 2001 study of Icacinaceae, Kårehed transferred Citronella, Gonocaryum, and Leptaulus from Icacinaceae to Cardiopteridaceae. He also provisionally placed Metteniusa, Dendrobangia, and Pseudobotrys there as well, until further studies could give some firm indication of their true relationships.

In 2007, a molecular phylogenetic study showed that Metteniusa belongs to a group of asterids known as the lamiids. The order Aquifoliales, which includes Cardiopteridaceae, belongs to another asterid group called campanulids.

The inclusion of Pseudobotrys in Cardiopteridaceae remains doubtful. DNA sequences submitted to GenBank in 2009 indicate that Dendrobangia does not belong in Cardiopteridaceae and is more closely related to genera like Apodytes.

Cardiopteridaceae, sensu Kårehed, is rather diverse in spite of having only six genera. Because of the distinctive structure of Cardiopteris, some authors today, continue to put Cardiopteris in a family by itself. The other five genera are then placed in Leptaulaceae, a family created by Philippe van Tieghem in 1897. The monophyly of Leptaulaceae has never been tested by phylogenetic analysis of DNA sequences.
