= Pericampylus =

Scientific classification
- Kingdom: Plantae
- Clade: Tracheophytes
- Clade: Angiosperms
- Clade: Eudicots
- Order: Ranunculales
- Family: Menispermaceae
- Genus: Pericampylus; Miers

Synonyms
- Heterotypic Synonyms: Pselium Lour.

Genus of flowering plants

Pericampylus is a genus of flowering plants in the family Menispermaceae. Its native range includes: Assam, Bangladesh, Borneo, Cambodia, south-central and southeast China, East Himalaya, Hainan, Java, Laos, the Lesser Sunda Islands, the Maluku Islands, Myanmar, Nepal, New Guinea, the Nicobar Islands, Peninsular Malaysia, the Philippines, the Ryukyu Islands, Sulawesi, Sumatra, Taiwan, Thailand, and Vietnam.

== Species ==
Accepted species in the genus include:

- Pericampylus glaucus (Lam.) Merr.
- Pericampylus macrophyllus Forman
