= Pseudobotrys =

Scientific classification
- Kingdom: Plantae
- Clade: Tracheophytes
- Clade: Angiosperms
- Clade: Eudicots
- Clade: Asterids
- Order: Aquifoliales
- Family: Cardiopteridaceae
- Genus: Pseudobotrys; Moeser

Type species
- Pseudobotrys dorae Moeser

Family of shrubs and trees

Pseudobotrys is a genus of trees and shrubs in the family Cardiopteridaceae described as a genus in 1912.

The entire genus is endemic to New Guinea.

== Species ==
1. Pseudobotrys cauliflora (Pulle) Sleumer 1940
2. Pseudobotrys dorae Moeser 1912
