= Leptaulus =

Scientific classification
- Kingdom: Plantae
- Clade: Tracheophytes
- Clade: Angiosperms
- Clade: Eudicots
- Clade: Asterids
- Order: Aquifoliales
- Family: Cardiopteridaceae
- Genus: Leptaulus; Benth.

Synonyms
- Acrocoelium Baill.

Genus of flowering plants

Leptaulus is a genus of trees and shrubs in the family Cardiopteridaceae described as a genus in 1862. It is native to tropical Africa including Madagascar.

Species

1. Leptaulus citrioides – Madagascar
2. Leptaulus congolanus – from Nigeria to Democratic Republic of the Congo
3. Leptaulus daphnoides – from Senegal to Tanzania
4. Leptaulus grandifolius – Cameroon, Gabon, Republic of the Congo, Equatorial Guinea
5. Leptaulus holstii – from Cameroon to Angola
6. Leptaulus madagascariensis – Madagascar
