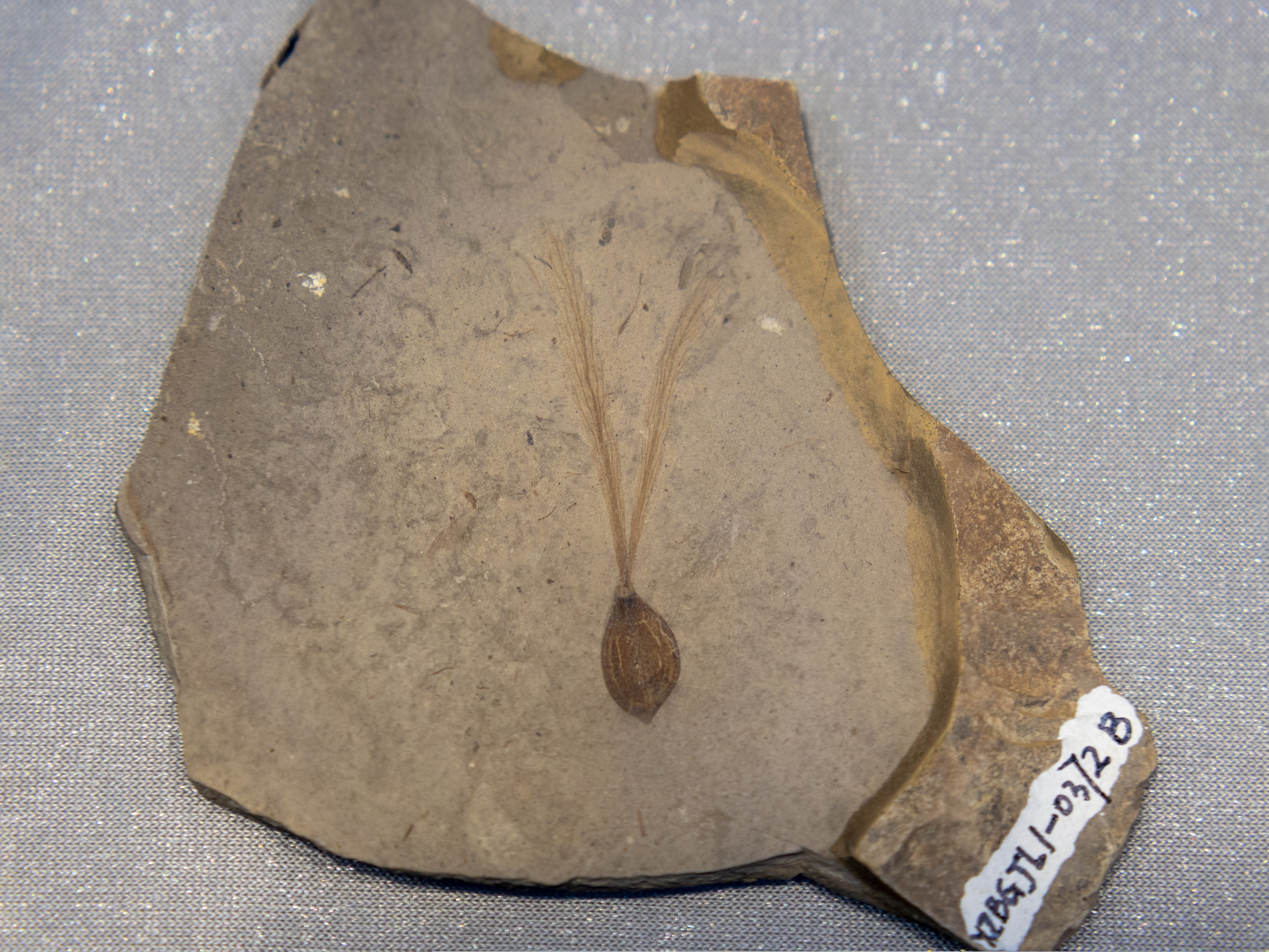
- Lagokarpos tibetensis, on display at the Paleozoological Museum of China.

Scientific classification
- Kingdom: Plantae
- Clade: Tracheophytes
- Clade: Angiosperms
- Genus: †Lagokarpos; McMurran & Manchester

Species
- †Lagokarpos lacustris McMurran & Manchester; †Lagokarpos tibetensis H. Tang, T. Su & Z. K. Zhou; †Lagokarpos sp. (undescribed fossil from Messel Pit, mentioned in description of L. tibetensis)

= Lagokarpos =

Extinct genus of plants

Lagokarpos is an extinct plant genus from the Late Paleocene to early Middle Eocene of North America, Germany and China. Its relationship with modern taxa is unclear.

== Etymology ==
Lago- is from lagós(λαγώς) which means "hare" and karpos is from karpós(καρπός) which means "fruit". The name refers to its rabbit-eared wings.
