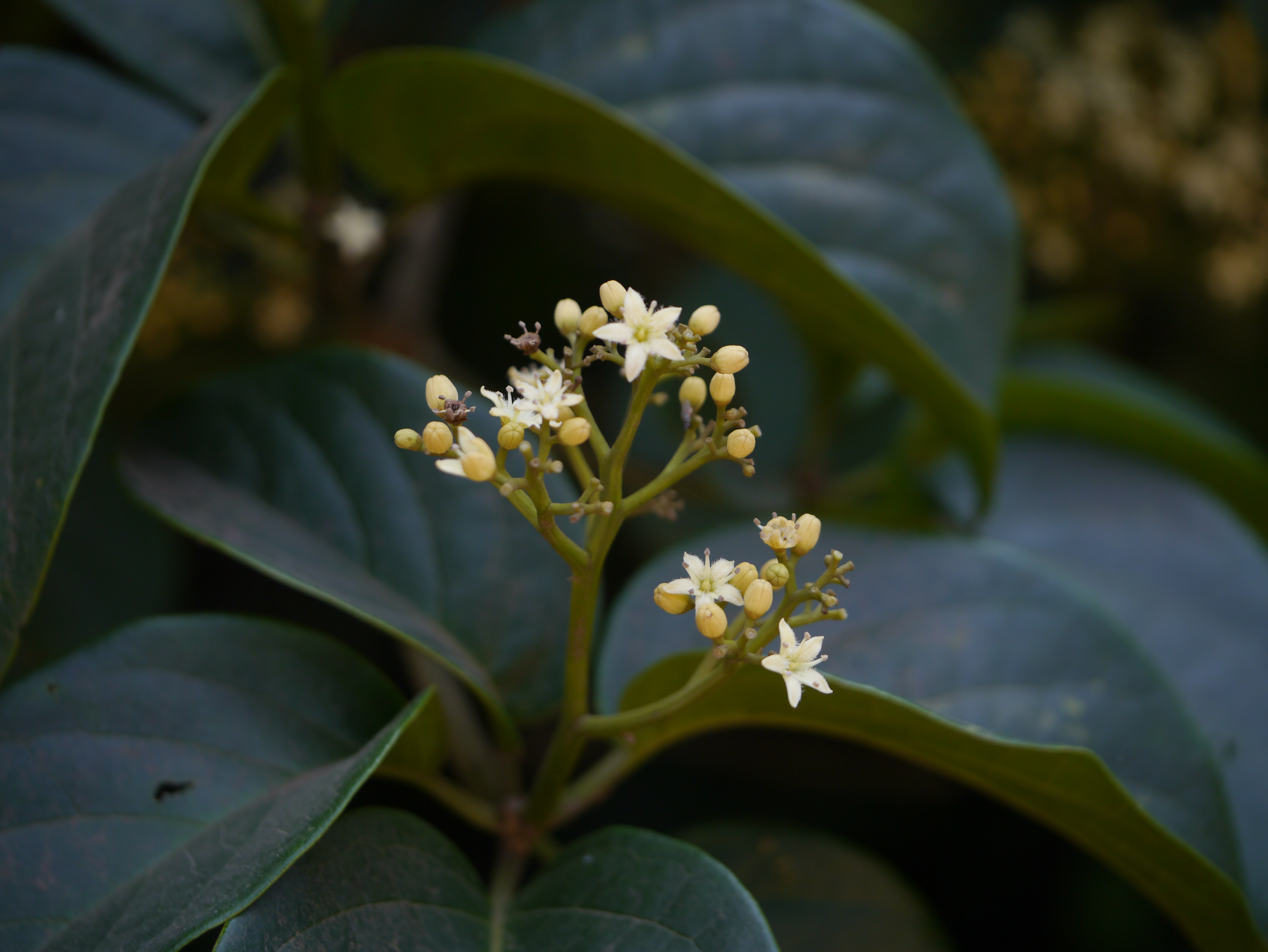
- Nothapodytes nimmoniana

Scientific classification
- Kingdom: Plantae
- Clade: Tracheophytes
- Clade: Angiosperms
- Clade: Eudicots
- Clade: Asterids
- Order: Icacinales
- Family: Icacinaceae; Miers

Genera
- See text

= Icacinaceae =

Icacinaceae Temporal range: Late Cretaceous - recent

Family of flowering plants

The Icacinaceae, also called the white pear family, are a family of flowering plants, consisting of trees, shrubs, and lianas, primarily of the tropics.

The family was traditionally circumscribed quite broadly, with around 55 genera totalling over 400 species. In 2001, though, this circumscription was found to be polyphyletic, and the family was split into four families in three different orders: Icacinaceae sensu stricto (then unplaced at order rank), Pennantiaceae (Apiales), Stemonuraceae (Aquifoliales) and Cardiopteridaceae (also Aquifoliales). Other genera have later been moved to Metteniusaceae (Metteniusales), so that Icacinaceae now include c. 23 genera and 160 species. One genus, Sleumeria, was described as late as 2005.

Icacinaceae belongs to the order Icacinales along with Oncothecaceae. The oldest member of this family is Palaeophytocrene chicoensis from the Campanian of California, known from a fossil fruit from the Chico Formation.

Icacina senegalensis extracts have shown activity against malaria parasites.

== Genera ==
List according to Stull et al. (2015):

Icacineae

- Alsodeiopsis Oliver
- Casimirella Hassler
- Icacina A. Jussieu
- Lavigeria Pierre
- Leretia Vellozo
- Merrilliodendron Kanehira
- Pleurisanthes Baillon

Iodeae

- Iodes Blume
- †Iodicarpa Manchester
- Mappianthus Handel-Mazzetti

Mappieae

- Mappia Jacquin
- Nothapodytes Blume – synonym of Mappia

Phytocreneae

- Desmostachys Miers
- Hosiea Hemsley & E. H. Wilson
- Miquelia Meisner
- Natsiatopsis Kurz
- Natsiatum Arnott
- †Palaeophytocrene Reid & Chandler
- Phytocrene Wallich
- Pyrenacantha Wight
- Ryticaryum Becc.
- Sarcostigma Wight & Arnott
- Sleumeria Utteridge et al.
- Stachyanthus Engler
- Vadensea Jongkind & O. Lachenaud

Incertae sedis

- Cassinopsis Sonder
- †Goweria Wolfe

== History ==
In 1841, George Bentham described Apodytes and Pogopetalum as new genera and united them with Icacina, Gomphandra, and Leretia to create the tribe Icacineae of what would later be called the family Olacaceae. Olacaceae was at that time, and through the 20th century, defined broadly, encompassing several families in the order Santalales. Pogopetalum was later synonymized with Emmotum.

In 1852, John Miers argued that Bentham's Icacineae did not belong in Olacaceae and he raised it to the rank of family as Icacinaceae.

Philippe van Tieghem realized that the family Icacinaceae, as circumscribed by Miers, consisted of groups that were only distantly related, and in 1897, he divided it into seven families. Van Tieghem's treatment in some ways anticipated the results of 21st century phylogenetic studies, in particular, by his establishment of the families Emmotaceae and Leptaulaceae. His division of Icacinaceae into smaller families was not accepted and other authors continued to define Icacinaceae in the broad sense, known as Icacinaceae sensu lato.

In 1942, Hermann Sleumer defined Icacinaceae broadly in his coverage of the family for Die Natürlichen Pflanzenfamilien. Later authors did likewise.

In the 1940s, Richard A. Howard wrote a series of papers on several of the genera. Sleumer wrote about the Asian genera in 1969, and the Malesian genera in 1971. Much of what is known about the family comes from regional floras such as Flora of Australia and Flora of China.

In 2001, Jesper Kårehed, using a combination of morphological and DNA sequence data, showed that Icacinaceae sensu lato was distantly polyphyletic and was, at least arguably, the worst of the plant families. It is now known to have rivaled Flacourtiaceae as an unnatural assemblage of disparate groups. Kårehed divided it into four families: Pennantiaceae, Stemonuraceae, Cardiopteridaceae, and Icacinaceae sensu stricto.

Pennantiaceae consists of the single genus Pennantia and is the most basal clade in the campanulid order Apiales.

Stemonuraceae is a family of 12 genera in the campanulid order Aquifoliales. It is sister to Cardiopteridaceae.

Before the phylogeny produced by Kårehed, Cardiopteridaceae contained only Cardiopteris. Kårehed transferred Citronella, Gonocaryum, and Leptaulus from Icacinaceae to this family, and provisionally placed Metteniusa, Dendrobangia, and Pseudobotrys there as well. Metteniusa was shown to be a lamiid in 2007, and was placed in a family by itself. The affinities of Dendrobangia and Pseudobotrys remain obscure.

Some authors have continued to maintain Cardiopteridaceae as a monogeneric family, placing Citronella, Gonocaryum, Leptaulus, Dendrobangia, and Pseudobotrys in Leptaulaceae. The study by Kårehed showed Cardiopteris to be embedded in Leptaulaceae, but statistical support for this position was not strong.

Some genera have later been moved to Metteniusaceae (Metteniusales).
