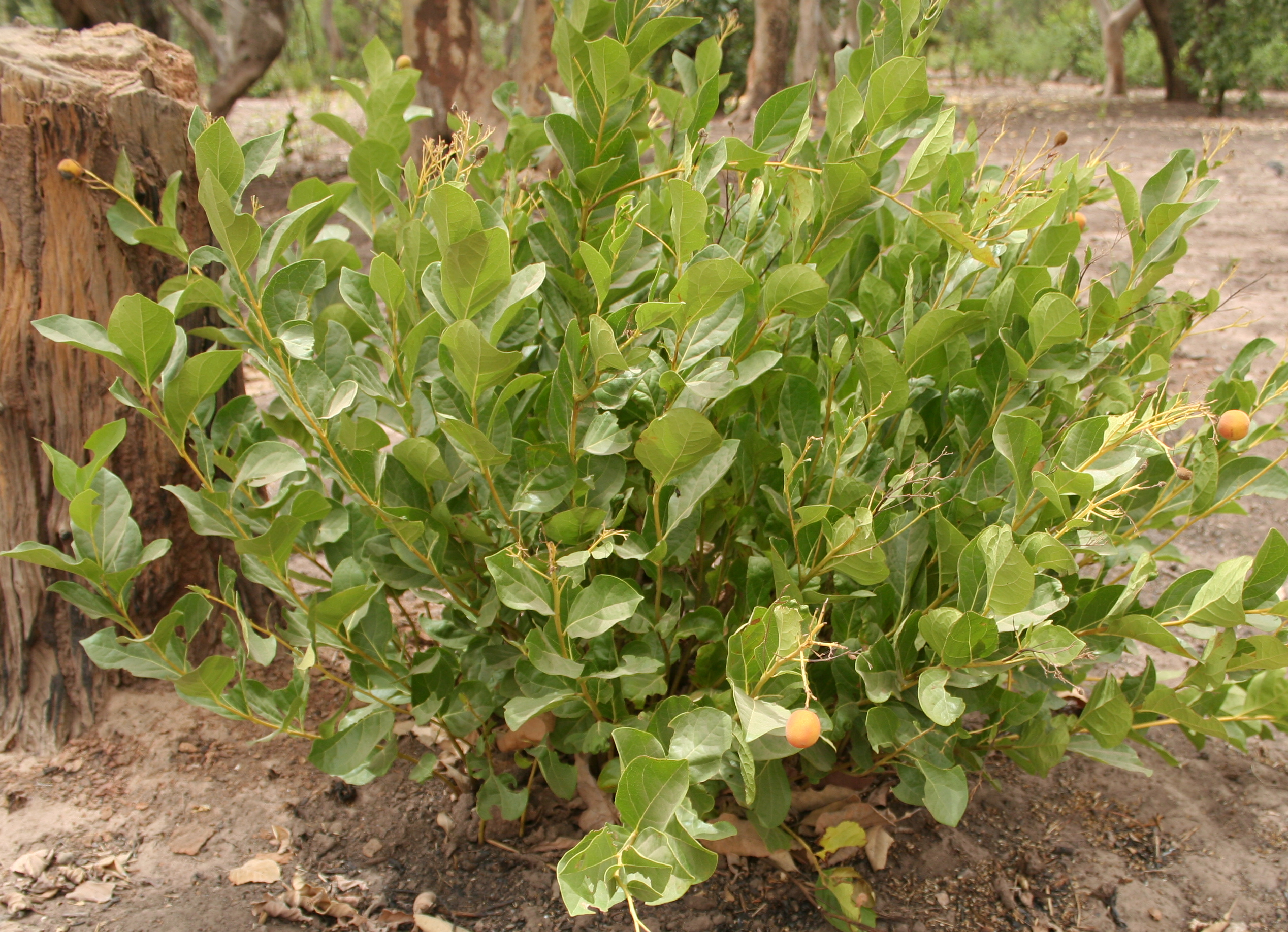
- Icacina oliviformis

Scientific classification
- Kingdom: Plantae
- Clade: Tracheophytes
- Clade: Angiosperms
- Clade: Eudicots
- Clade: Asterids
- Clade: Lamiids
- Order: Icacinales; Tiegh.

Families
- Icacinaceae; Oncothecaceae

= Icacinales =

Icacinales Temporal range: Late Cretaceous - recent

Order of flowering plants

Icacinales is an order of flowering plants.

The order did not exist in the 2009 APG III system, and was added in the 2016 APG IV system, including two families, Icacinaceae and Oncothecaceae, which were both unplaced families in APG III.
