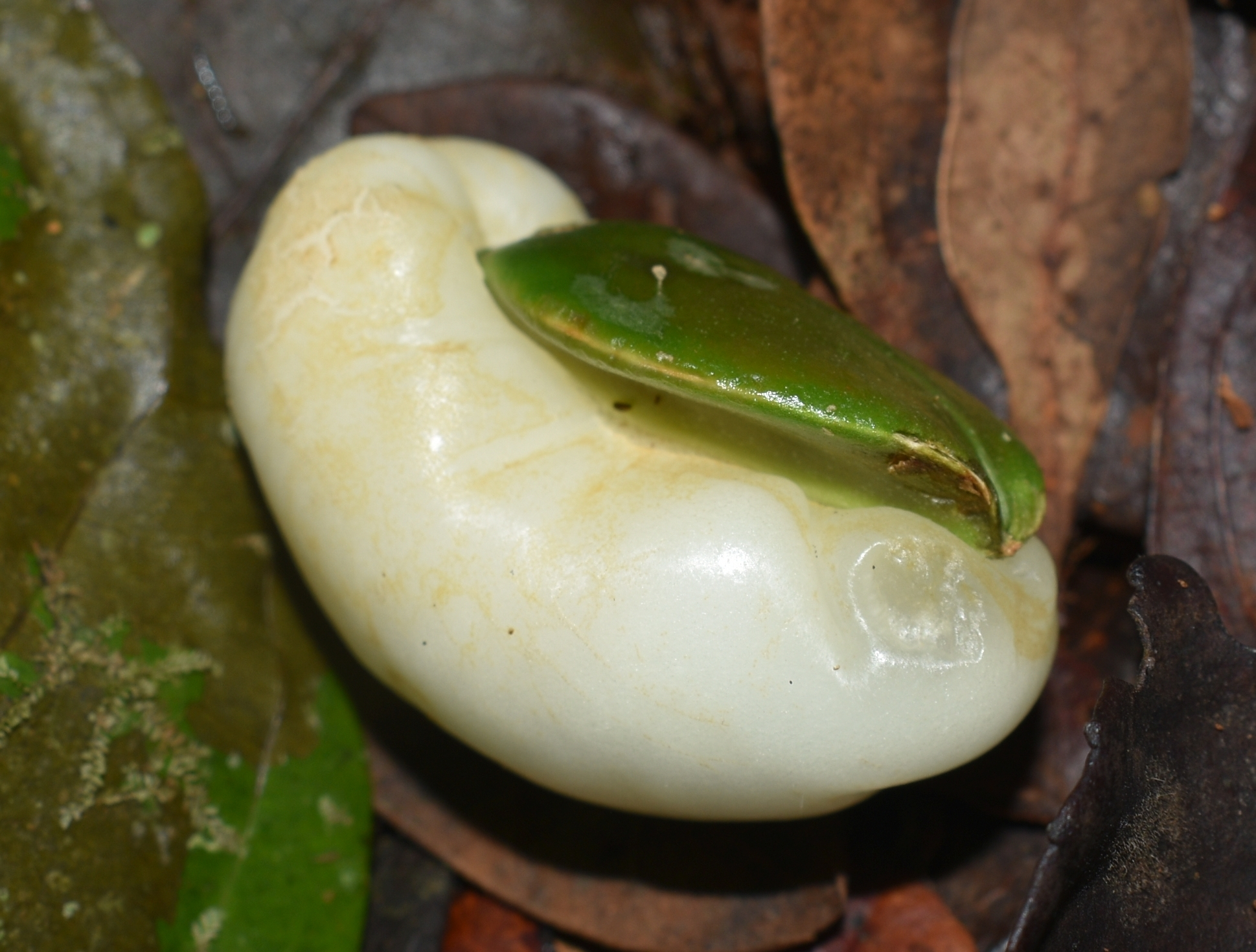
- Distinctive fruit

Conservation status
- Least Concern (IUCN 3.1)

Scientific classification
- Kingdom: Plantae
- Clade: Tracheophytes
- Clade: Angiosperms
- Clade: Eudicots
- Clade: Asterids
- Order: Aquifoliales
- Family: Stemonuraceae
- Genus: Irvingbaileya; R.A.Howard
- Species: I. australis

Binomial name
- Irvingbaileya australis (C.T.White) R.A.Howard

Synonyms
- Medusanthera australis (C.T.White) R.A.Howard; Tylecarpus australis C.T.White

= Irvingbaileya =

Genus of plants

Irvingbaileya is a monotypic genus—that is, a genus that contains just one species—of flowering plants in the family Stemonuraceae. The sole species is Irvingbaileya australis, commonly known as buff beech or wax berry, a rainforest tree endemic to Queensland, Australia.

== Description ==
Irvingbaileya australis is a small tree growing to about 20 m (66 ft) high. The leaves are arranged alternately on the twigs, are held on short petioles, and measure up to 15 cm (5.9 in) long and 5 cm (2.0 in) wide. They are narrowly elliptic in shape, with 5–8 pairs of lateral veins either side of the midrib.

The inflorescences are produced either terminally or in the leaf axils. They are cymes up to 3 cm (1.2 in) long, carrying up to 20 small flowers. This species is dioecious, meaning that male and female flowers are borne on separate plants.

The fruit is distinctive — a green, flattened, elliptic drupe about 25 mm (1 in) long, 20 mm (0.8 in) wide and containing a single seed, with a white, succulent, waxy appendage attached to one side.

== Taxonomy ==
The species was first described—as Tylecarpus australis, family Icacinaceae—in 1918 by the Australian botanist Cyril Tenison White and published in Contributions to the Queensland flora in the Botany Bulletin of the Department of Agriculture, Queensland. The type specimen was collected near the Johnstone River south of Cairns

In 1940 the American botanist and Icacinaceae specialist Richard A. Howard moved the species to the genus Medusanthera, and then in 1943 to the newly-created genus Irvingbaileya. Later still the family Icacinaceae was found to be polyphyletic, and in 2001 the Swedish botanist Jesper Kårehed moved this genus to Stemonuraceae.

=== Etymology ===
The genus name Irvingbaileya was chosen by Howard to honour Irving Widmer Bailey (1884–1967), an American botanist known for his work in plant anatomy. The specific epithet australis means southern, and refers to the plant's origin in Australia.

== Distribution and habitat ==
This species is endemic to northeastern Queensland, and is found at altitudes from sea level to about 800 m (2,600 ft), although collections have been made at up to 1,200 m (3,900 ft). It grows in well developed rainforest from near Rossville to near Tully.

== Conservation ==
As of September 2024, this species has been assessed to be of least concern by the International Union for Conservation of Nature (IUCN) and by the Queensland Government under its Nature Conservation Act.

== Ecology ==
The fallen fruit is collected by male satin bowerbirds (Ptilonorhynchus violaceus), and used as decoration for their bowers. They are also eaten by a variety of fauna, including cassowaries (Casuarius casuarius), giant white-tailed rats (Uromys caudimaculatus) and other rodents, crimson rosellas (Platycercus elegans), spectacled flying foxes (Pteropus conspicillatus) and musky rat-kangaroos (Hypsiprymnodon moschatus).
