= Gomphandra comosa =

Conservation status
- Vulnerable (IUCN 2.3)

Scientific classification
- Kingdom: Plantae
- Clade: Tracheophytes
- Clade: Angiosperms
- Clade: Eudicots
- Clade: Asterids
- Order: Aquifoliales
- Family: Stemonuraceae
- Genus: Gomphandra
- Species: G. comosa

Binomial name
- Gomphandra comosa King

Synonyms
- Urandra comosa (King) R.A.Howard

Species of plant

Gomphandra comosa is a species of flowering plant in the family Stemonuraceae. It is endemic to the Andaman and Nicobar Islands. It is threatened by habitat loss.
