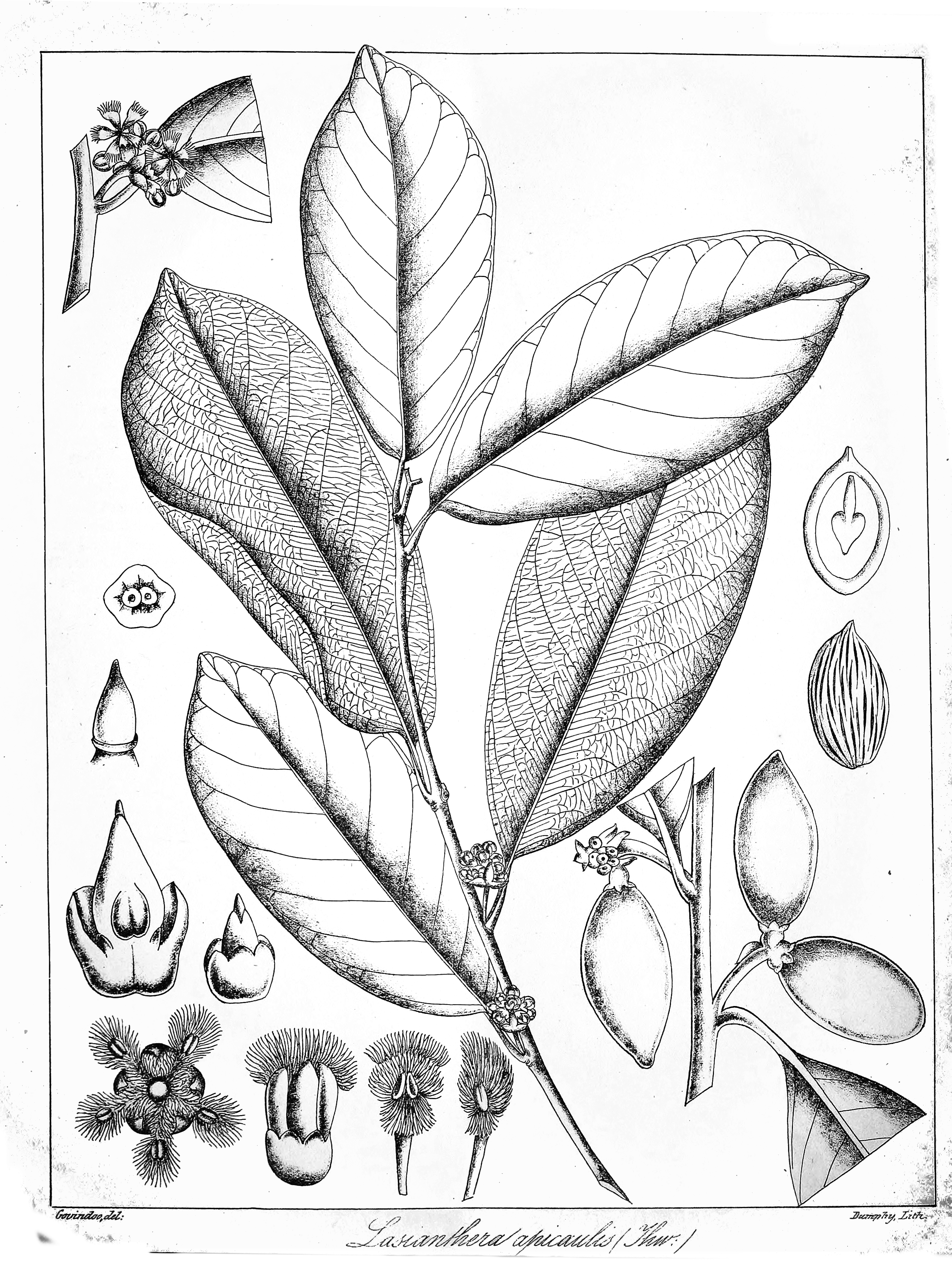

Conservation status
- Critically Endangered (IUCN 2.3)

Scientific classification
- Kingdom: Plantae
- Clade: Tracheophytes
- Clade: Angiosperms
- Clade: Eudicots
- Clade: Asterids
- Order: Aquifoliales
- Family: Stemonuraceae
- Genus: Stemonurus
- Species: S. apicalis

Binomial name
- Stemonurus apicalis (Thwaites) Miers

Synonyms
- Lasianthera apicalis (Thwaites) Thwaites; Urandra apicalis Thwaites

= Stemonurus apicalis =

Species of plant

Stemonurus apicalis is a species of plant in the Stemonuraceae family. It is endemic to Sri Lanka.
