= Gomphandra coriacea =

Scientific classification
- Kingdom: Plantae
- Clade: Tracheophytes
- Clade: Angiosperms
- Clade: Eudicots
- Clade: Asterids
- Order: Aquifoliales
- Family: Stemonuraceae
- Genus: Gomphandra
- Species: G. coriacea

Binomial name
- Gomphandra coriacea Wight (1840)

Synonyms
- Platea coriacea (Wight) Thwaites (1858); Stemonurus coriaceus (Wight) Miers (1852); Stemonurus gardneri Miers (1852); Stemonurus walkeri Miers (1862)

Species of plant

Gomphandra coriacea is a species of plant in the Stemonuraceae family. It is native to southwestern India and Sri Lanka.
