= Grisollea thomassetii =

Conservation status
- Endangered (IUCN 3.1)

Scientific classification
- Kingdom: Plantae
- Clade: Tracheophytes
- Clade: Angiosperms
- Clade: Eudicots
- Clade: Asterids
- Order: Aquifoliales
- Family: Stemonuraceae
- Genus: Grisollea
- Species: G. thomassetii

Binomial name
- Grisollea thomassetii Hemsl.

Species of flowering plant

Grisollea thomassetii is a species of flowering plant in the family Stemonuraceae. It is a tree endemic to Mahé and Silhouette islands in the Seychelles.
