= Codiocarpus =

Scientific classification
- Kingdom: Plantae
- Clade: Tracheophytes
- Clade: Angiosperms
- Clade: Eudicots
- Clade: Asterids
- Order: Aquifoliales
- Family: Stemonuraceae
- Genus: Codiocarpus; R.A.Howard

Genus of flowering plants

Codiocarpus is a genus of flowering plants belonging to the family Stemonuraceae.

Its native range is Tropical Asia.

Species:

- Codiocarpus andamanicus (Kurz) R.A.Howard
- Codiocarpus merrittii (Merr.) R.A.Howard
