= Ilex caniensis =

Conservation status
- Vulnerable (IUCN 2.3)

Scientific classification
- Kingdom: Plantae
- Clade: Tracheophytes
- Clade: Angiosperms
- Clade: Eudicots
- Clade: Asterids
- Order: Aquifoliales
- Family: Aquifoliaceae
- Genus: Ilex
- Species: I. caniensis

Binomial name
- Ilex caniensis J. F. Macbr.

Species of plant

Ilex caniensis is a species of plant in the family Aquifoliaceae. It is endemic to Peru. Some authorities have it as a synonym of Ilex uniflora.
