= Cantleya =

Conservation status
- Vulnerable (IUCN 2.3)

Scientific classification
- Kingdom: Plantae
- Clade: Tracheophytes
- Clade: Angiosperms
- Clade: Eudicots
- Clade: Asterids
- Order: Aquifoliales
- Family: Stemonuraceae
- Genus: Cantleya; Ridl.
- Species: C. corniculata

Binomial name
- Cantleya corniculata (Becc.) Howard

Genus of flowering plants

Cantleya is a genus of plant in the family Stemonuraceae. The sole species is Cantleya corniculata, found in Indonesia and Malaysia.
