= Flora of Montserrat =

Plants found on Montserrat, West Indies

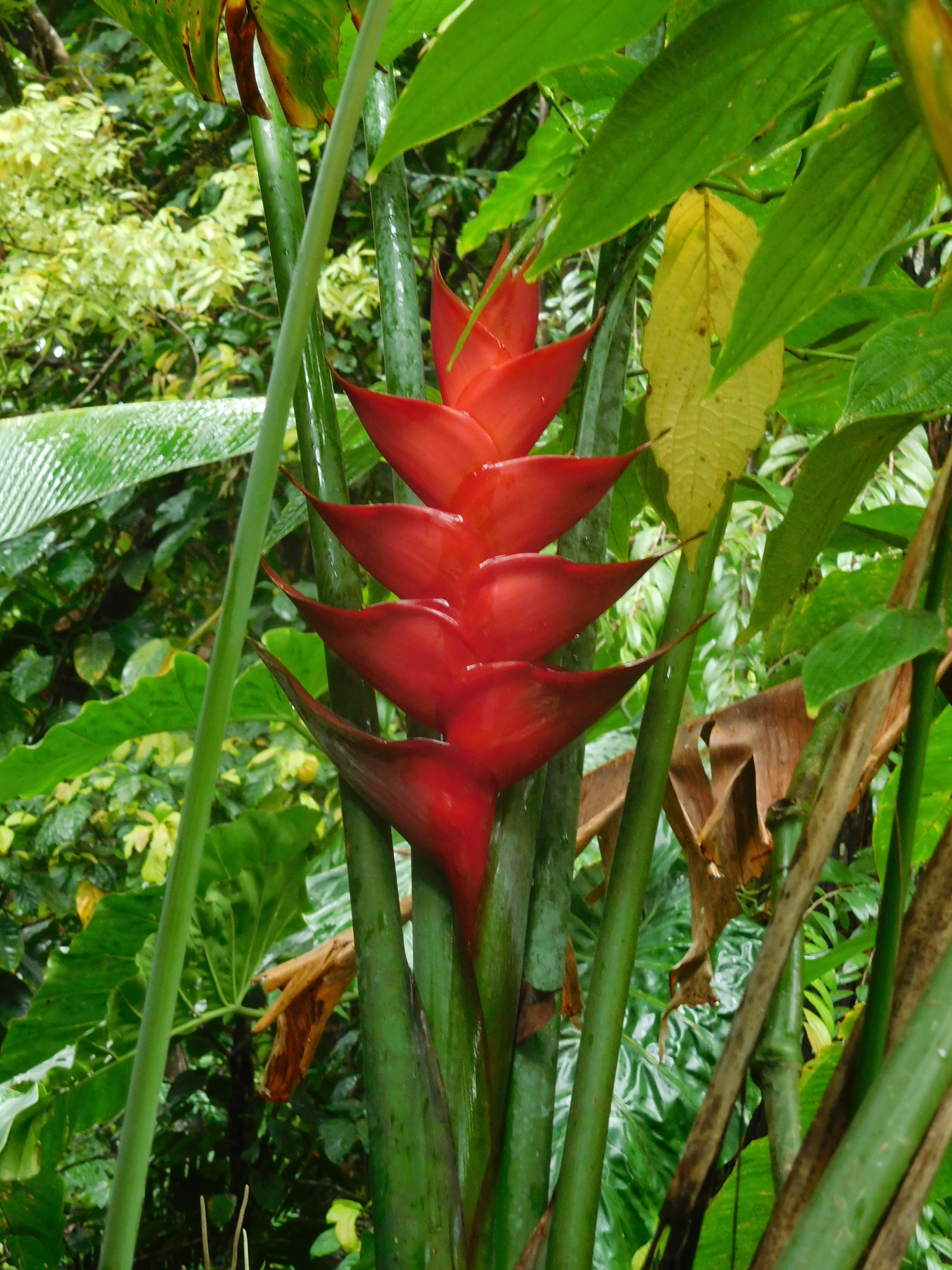
Heliconia caribaea (Heliconiaceae)

The flora of Montserrat consists of almost 1200 vascular plant species and a currently unknown number of bryophytes. The flora is consistent with neighboring islands of the Lesser Antilles. There are three endemic species described, one of which is presumed extinct in the aftermath of the volcanic eruption beginning in 1995.

Montserrat has not been a subject of large scale botanical focus, and while the first checklist for the island was presented in Richard Howard's Flora of the Lesser Antilles, Montserrat was neither a significant focus nor thoroughly surveyed. In recent years, there has been an increase in botanical activity in Montserrat, but the results of this research have yet to be published outside of a web-hosted database. For an island in an area known for its biodiversity, relatively few species have been collected. Additionally, most collections from the island were made before the current volcanic activity, necessitating further research. Since 2005, botanists from Royal Botanic Gardens, Kew and Bard College at Simon's Rock have been adding to the collections made.

== History ==
Montserrat was the subject of active botanical collection in the 18th century, which petered out in the 19th. Montserrat saw a resurgence of interest in the 20th century prior to the 1995 volcanic activity. Since the eruptions, there have been two primary collection efforts. In 2005-2006, botanists affiliated with the Royal Botanic Gardens, Kew collected in the Centre Hills, and Donald McClelland—then affiliated with Bard College at Simon's Rock—began collecting to produce a thorough floristic treatment in 2015.

== Habitats ==
Due to its topographical variation, Montserrat is host to diverse ecological environments. The eastern side of the island is dry and predominantly populated by plants in the genus Acacia, while the central and western parts of the island, particularly the Centre Hills Nature Preserve, includes tropical rainforests and cloud forests at high elevations.

== Vascular plants ==
More than 1100 vascular plants have been recorded on Montserrat, almost 1000 of which are angiosperms. There are three described endemics: an epiphytic orchid (Epidendrum montserratense), a woody plant in the coffee family known by the common name "pribby" (Rondeletia buxifolia), and a treelet in the willow family (Xylosma serrata). X. serrata is possibly extinct, as it has not been observed since its habitat was buried in pyroclastic flow.

Two gymnosperms have been recorded on Montserrat: Podocarpus coriaceus and Araucaria heterophylla, the latter of which is introduced. Of the ferns recorded, there are four tree ferns in the family Cyatheaceae and sixteen filmy ferns, among over 100 others. Nine species of Lycophytes have been recorded.

== Human uses ==
Herbal medicine is common on Montserrat. A study, performed prior to the eruption of the South Soufrière Hills but published in 2004, found that 272 species in 78 families had local ethnobotanical uses. The majority of plants used in modern Montserratian folk medicine are endemic to the West Indies or introduced prior to the arrival of Europeans in the region. The modern Montserratian pharmacopoeia overlaps minimally with that of indigenous peoples of the Caribbean, with only 52 species endemic to the Americas in common, and 24 of those without a common medicinal use. Based on the proportion of plants used for the same purposes, "15% of Montserratian folk medicine could be derived from Amerindian sources."

Some common drinks found on Montserrat include sorrel and tamarind teas. Like many Caribbean islands, breadfruit was introduced as a supplementary food crop when Montserrat's economy centered around plantations operated by enslaved people.

The national flower of Montserrat is the red heliconia.
