= Irving Widmer Bailey =

American botanist (1884–1967)

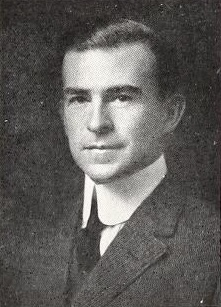
- Bailey in 1920
- Born: August 15, 1884; Tilton, New Hampshire
- Died: May 16, 1967 (aged 82); Cambridge, Massachusetts
- Education: Harvard College
- Scientific career
- Fields: Botany
- Workplaces: Arnold Arboretum; Gray Herbarium
- Doctoral students: Elso Barghoorn

Irving Widmer Bailey (August 15, 1884 – May 16, 1967) was an American botanist known for his work in plant anatomy. He was a faculty member at Harvard University for nearly his entire career, working principally at the Harvard University Herbaria.

== Early life and education ==
Bailey was born in 1884, in Tilton, New Hampshire, to Ruth Pouter Bailey and Solon Irving Bailey. His father was a professor of astronomy at Harvard University. In 1907 Bailey graduated from Harvard College, and two years later received his master's degree in forestry from Harvard's Graduate School of Applied Sciences.

== Scientific career ==
In 1909, Bailey took a job as instructor of forestry at Harvard's Graduate School of Applied Sciences. He went on to work at the Bussey Institution, which later became a division of Harvard's Graduate School of Applied Biology, and also held positions at the Arnold Arboretum and Gray Herbarium, both of which were divisions of Harvard University Herbaria.

Bailey was elected to the American Academy of Arts and Sciences in 1915. He was elected to the American Philosophical Society in 1926 and the United States National Academy of Sciences in 1929.

In 1943, botanist Richard A. Howard named a genus of flowering plants from Australia, (belonging to the family Stemonuraceae) as Irvingbaileya in his honour.

In 1945, at the request of a dean of the Harvard Faculty of Arts and Sciences, Bailey created what became known as the "Bailey Plan", which controversially suggested that all sectors of botany should be unified. His plan resulted in a new building to house the Harvard University Herbaria.

During his 58-year career, he published 140 papers and 2 books. In 1954, he was awarded the Mary Soper Pope Memorial Award in botany. He died in 1967.

== World War I and World War II ==
In World War I, Bailey worked for the Bureau of Aircraft Production at Wright Field in Dayton, Ohio. A skilled engineer as well as a botanist, he was put in charge of selecting wood for airplane construction.

During World War II he worked on a camouflage project at the Engineers' School at Fort Belvoir, Virginia.

== Personal life ==
In 1911, Bailey married Helen Diman Harwood.
