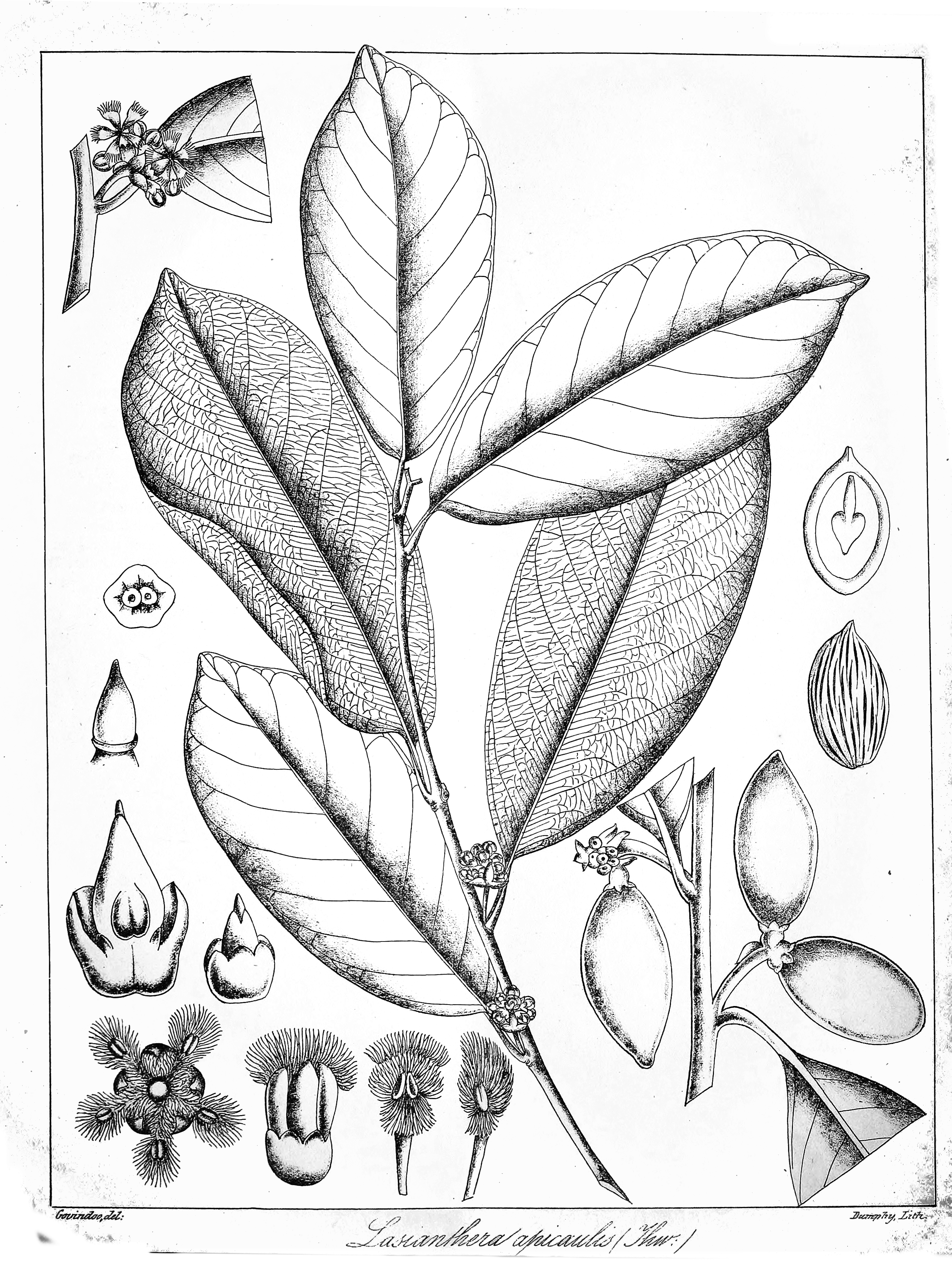
- Stemonurus apicalis

Scientific classification
- Kingdom: Plantae
- Clade: Tracheophytes
- Clade: Angiosperms
- Clade: Eudicots
- Clade: Asterids
- Order: Aquifoliales
- Family: Stemonuraceae
- Genus: Stemonurus; Blume

Synonyms
- Urandra Thwaites

= Stemonurus =

Genus of plants

Stemonurus is a genus of plants in the family Stemonuraceae.

Species include:

- Stemonurus ammui (Kaneh.) Sleumer
- Stemonurus apicalis (Thwaites) Miers
- Stemonurus celebicus Valeton
- Stemonurus corrugatus Utteridge & Schori
- Stemonurus dichrocarpus (Gagnep.) Sleumer
- Stemonurus gitingensis (Elmer) Sleumer
- Stemonurus grandifolius Becc.
- Stemonurus malaccensis (Mast.) Sleumer
- Stemonurus monticola (G.Schellenb.) Sleumer
- Stemonurus perobtusus (Gagnep.) Sleumer
- Stemonurus punctatus Becc.
- Stemonurus scorpioides Becc.
- Stemonurus secundiflorus Blume
- Stemonurus umbellatus Becc.
