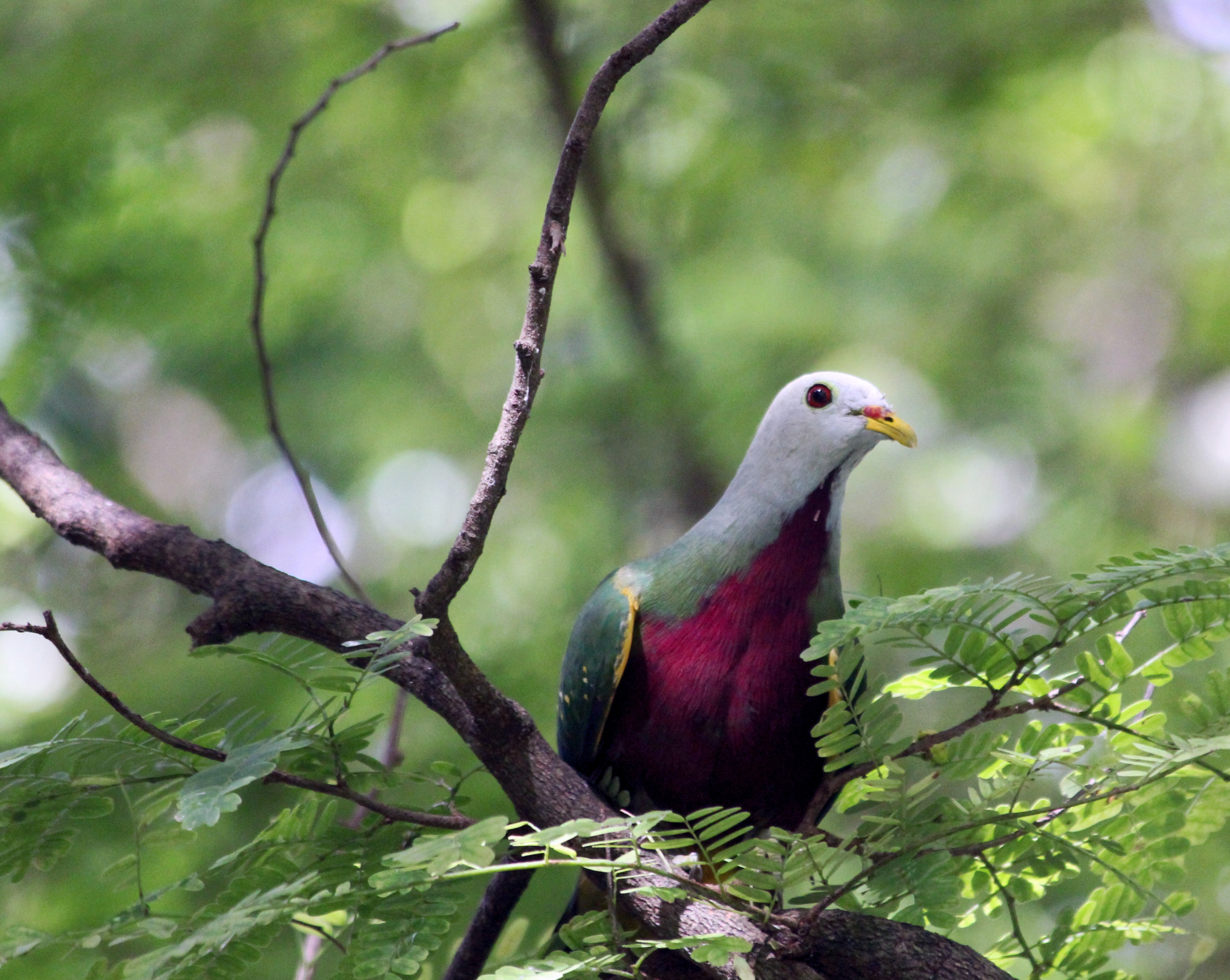

Conservation status
- Least Concern (IUCN 3.1)

Scientific classification
- Kingdom: Animalia
- Phylum: Chordata
- Class: Aves
- Order: Columbiformes
- Family: Columbidae
- Genus: Megaloprepia
- Species: M. magnifica

Binomial name
- Megaloprepia magnifica (Temminck, 1821)

Synonyms
- Ptilinopus magnificus; Palumbes magnifica

= Wompoo fruit dove =

Species of bird

The wompoo fruit dove (Megaloprepia magnifica), also known as wompoo pigeon and "magnificent fruit dove" among others, is one of the larger fruit doves native to New Guinea and eastern Australia.

== Taxonomy ==
The wompoo fruit dove was formally described in 1821 by the Dutch zoologist Coenraad Jacob Temminck from a specimen that had been collected on the east coast of Australia. He placed it with the doves and pigeons in the genus Columba and coined the binomial name Columba magnifica. This fruit dove was formerly placed in the genus Ptilinopus. A molecular genetic study published in 2014 found that the fruit dove genus Ptilinopus was paraphyletic. In order to create monophyletic genera, nine species were moved from Ptilinopus to Ramphiculus and two species, the scarlet-breasted fruit dove and the wompoo fruit dove, were moved from Ptilinopus to Megaloprepia . The name Megaloprepia is from Ancient Greek μεγαλοπρεπεια/megaloprepeia meaning "magnificence".

Five subspecies are recognised:

- M. m. puella (Lesson, RP & Garnot, 1827) – Raja Ampat Islands (northwest of New Guinea, except Gebe and Kofiau) and Bird's Head Peninsula (northwest New Guinea)
- M. m. poliura Salvadori, 1878 – Yapen (Geelvink Bay is., northwest New Guinea), central west to northeast, southeast New Guinea, Manam, Bagabag and Karkar Island (north of northeast New Guinea) and Normanby (east D'Entrecasteaux Archipelago, east of southeast New Guinea)
- M. m. assimilis (Gould, 1850) – north Cape York Peninsula, northeast Queensland (far northeast Australia)
- M. m. keri Mathews, 1912 – southeast Cape York Peninsula, northeast Queensland to central east Queensland (northeast, central east Australia)
- M. m. magnifica (Temminck, 1821) – southeast Queensland to central south New South Wales (central east, southeast Australia)

== Description ==
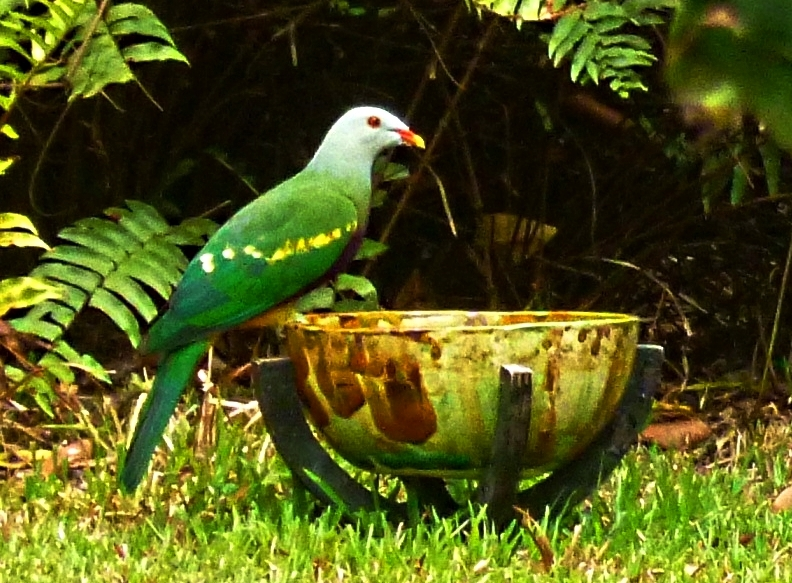
Wompoo pigeon in a garden near Cooktown, Queensland

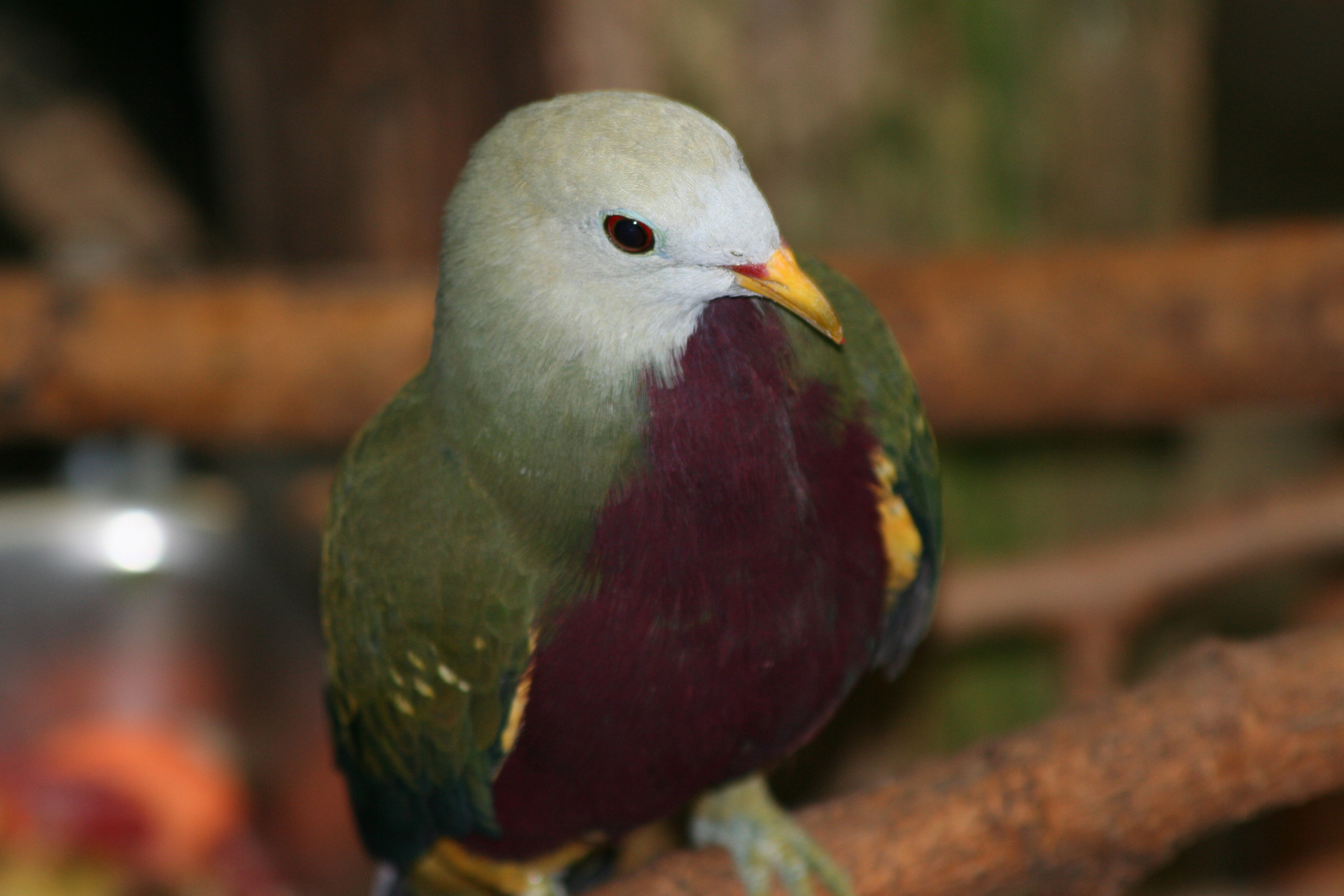
At Dallas Zoo, USA

The wompoo fruit dove measures up to 45 cm (18 in) in overall length, but is generally far smaller in northern regions. It has purple plumage around its neck, chest and upper belly. Its lower belly is yellow and it has green underparts. The sexes are similar and the juveniles have a duller and greener plumage compared to adults. Notwithstanding their bright plumage, they are hard to see amongst the forest canopy, thanks to their unobtrusive, quiet habits. Their call sounds like wollack-wa-hoo and often sounds very human.

== Behaviour ==
=== Food and feeding ===
The wompoo fruit dove can be seen in large flocks where food is abundant. The birds feed off fruit-bearing trees in rainforests such as figs. They also occasionally eat insects. They can eat large fruits whole and are able to acrobatically collect fruit of trees and vines. They do not like to travel long distances, preferring to stay in their local area and make use of whatever fruit are in season. The diet of this species was extensively studied in the Port Moresby area by Frith et al. (1976). Despite their small size, they are able to swallow fruits of 5 cm^{3} (0.31 cu in) volume, which would translate into a diameter of about 2 cm (0.79 in) in spherical fruit.

Major food items included:

- figs, particularly Ficus macrophylla, including Ficus albipila, Ficus benjamina, Ficus drupacea, Ficus glaberrima, Ficus virens and Ficus wassa - preferentially in the late dry and wet season (October - March)
- Fruit of cinnamon trees (Cinnamomum sp.), Litsea, Neolitsea and Cryptocarya - whenever available
- Arecaceae (palm) fruit, including Archontophoenix, Arenga, Calamus and Caryota - mid-late dry season (August - October) and January
- Annonaceae fruit, such as Ylang-ylang (Cananga odorata) and Polyalthia - whenever available

Food items of minor importance were fruit of:

- Eugenia, Syzygium, Acmena - important in May
- Hypserpa - important in July and August
- Planchonella - important August - October
- Elaeocarpus - important in October
- Erythroxylon scarinatum - important in November and December
- Tinospora smilacina, Glochidion, Gomphandra australiana, Gomphandra montana, Cayratia, Cissus, Terminalia, Diospyros, Chionanthus, Vitex cofassus, Alocasia, and Psychotria - taken as available

=== Breeding ===
Rush Creek, SE Queensland, Australia

Breeding times will vary according to weather conditions. The nest is sturdily constructed from forked twigs not high from the ground. Both sexes help in the construction of the nest. One white egg is laid and the parents share the incubation and care of the chick. In the event that the chick dies, the doves will attempt to have a second offspring in the same season.

== Conservation ==
Widespread and common throughout its large range, the wompoo fruit dove is evaluated as Least Concern on the IUCN Red List of Threatened Species.
