= Grisollea =

Scientific classification
- Kingdom: Plantae
- Clade: Tracheophytes
- Clade: Angiosperms
- Clade: Eudicots
- Clade: Asterids
- Order: Aquifoliales
- Family: Stemonuraceae
- Genus: Grisollea; Baill.

Genus of plants

Grisollea is a genus of plants in the family Stemonuraceae.

Species include:

- Grisollea crassifolia Schori, Lowry & G.E.Schatz
- Grisollea myriantha Baill.
- Grisollea thomassetii Hemsl.
