= Hartleya =

Scientific classification
- Kingdom: Plantae
- Clade: Tracheophytes
- Clade: Angiosperms
- Clade: Eudicots
- Clade: Asterids
- Order: Aquifoliales
- Family: Stemonuraceae
- Genus: Hartleya; Sleumer
- Species: H. inopinata

Binomial name
- Hartleya inopinata Sleumer

Genus of plants

Hartleya is a monotypic genus of flowering plants belonging to the family Stemonuraceae. The only species is Hartleya inopinata.

It is native to New Guinea.

The genus name of Hartleya is in honour of Thomas Gordon Hartley (1931–2016), an American botanist. The Latin specific epithet of inopinata refers to inopinatus meaning ‘unexpected’. It was first described and published in Blumea Vol.17 on page 218 in 1969.
