= Discophora =

Discophora is a scientific name for several groups of organisms:

- Discophora (butterfly), a genus of butterflies in the family Nymphalidae
- Discophora (plant), a genus of trees in the family Stemonuraceae
- Discophora, an obsolete name for a class of jellyfish, Scyphozoa
- Discophora, an obsolete name for a subclass of jellyfish, Discomedusae

One of the marginal sensory bodies of medusae belonging to the Discophora
