= Ilex scabridula =

Conservation status
- Least Concern (IUCN 3.1)

Scientific classification
- Kingdom: Plantae
- Clade: Tracheophytes
- Clade: Angiosperms
- Clade: Eudicots
- Clade: Asterids
- Order: Aquifoliales
- Family: Aquifoliaceae
- Genus: Ilex
- Species: I. scabridula

Binomial name
- Ilex scabridula Merr. & L. M. Perry

Species of holly

Ilex scabridula is a species of plant in the family Aquifoliaceae. It is endemic to New Guinea, occurring to over 3000 metres above sea level in disturbed and primary forest, often near rivers.
