= Lasianthera =

Scientific classification
- Kingdom: Plantae
- Clade: Tracheophytes
- Clade: Angiosperms
- Clade: Eudicots
- Clade: Asterids
- Order: Aquifoliales
- Family: Stemonuraceae
- Genus: Lasianthera; P.Beauv.

Genus of plants

Lasianthera is a genus of flowering plants belonging to the family Stemonuraceae.

Its native range is Nigeria to Western Central Tropical Africa.

Species:

- Lasianthera africana P.Beauv.
