= Whitmorea =

Conservation status
- Vulnerable (IUCN 3.1)

Scientific classification
- Kingdom: Plantae
- Clade: Embryophytes
- Clade: Tracheophytes
- Clade: Spermatophytes
- Clade: Angiosperms
- Clade: Eudicots
- Clade: Asterids
- Order: Aquifoliales
- Family: Stemonuraceae
- Genus: Whitmorea; Sleumer
- Species: W. grandiflora

Binomial name
- Whitmorea grandiflora Sleumer

Species of flowering plant

Whitmorea is a monotypic genus of flowering plants belonging to the family Stemonuraceae. It only contains one known species, Whitmorea grandiflora.

It is native to the Solomon Islands.

The genus name of Whitmorea is in honour of Timothy Charles Whitmore (1935–2002), an English ecologist, botanist, geologist and climatologist. The Latin specific epithet grandiflora means large flower from Grandis, meaning large, and flora, meaning flower. Both the genus and the species were first described and published in Blumea in 1969.
