= Gastrolepis =

Scientific classification
- Kingdom: Plantae
- Clade: Tracheophytes
- Clade: Angiosperms
- Clade: Eudicots
- Clade: Asterids
- Order: Aquifoliales
- Family: Stemonuraceae
- Genus: Gastrolepis; Tiegh.

Genus of plants

Gastrolepis is a genus of shrubs and trees in the family Stemonuraceae. The genus is endemic to New Caledonia in the Pacific and contains two species.

== List of species ==
- Gastrolepis alticola Munzinger, McPherson & Lowry
- Gastrolepis austrocaledonica (Baill.) R.A. Howard
