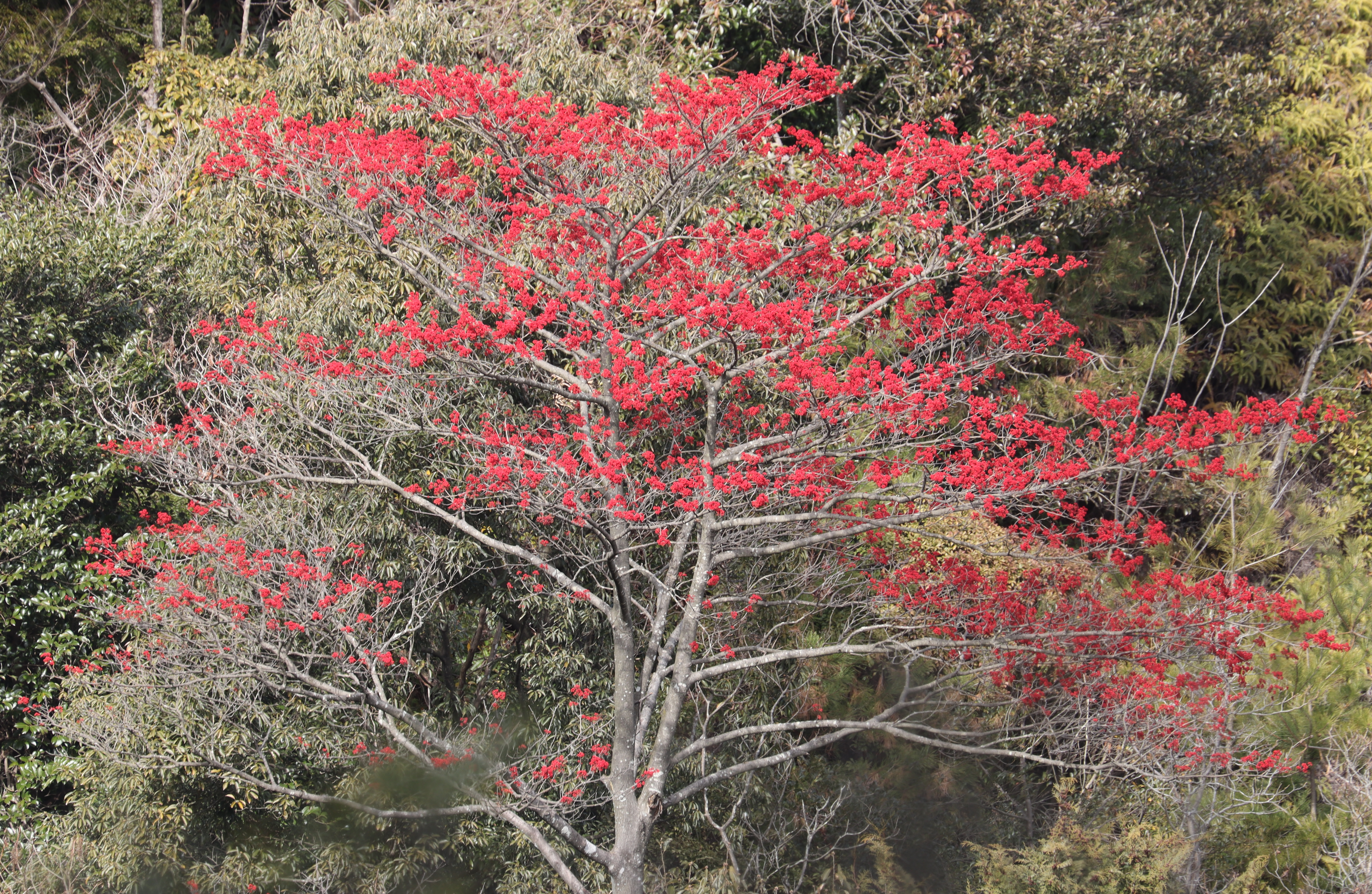
- Fruit remains on tree in winter
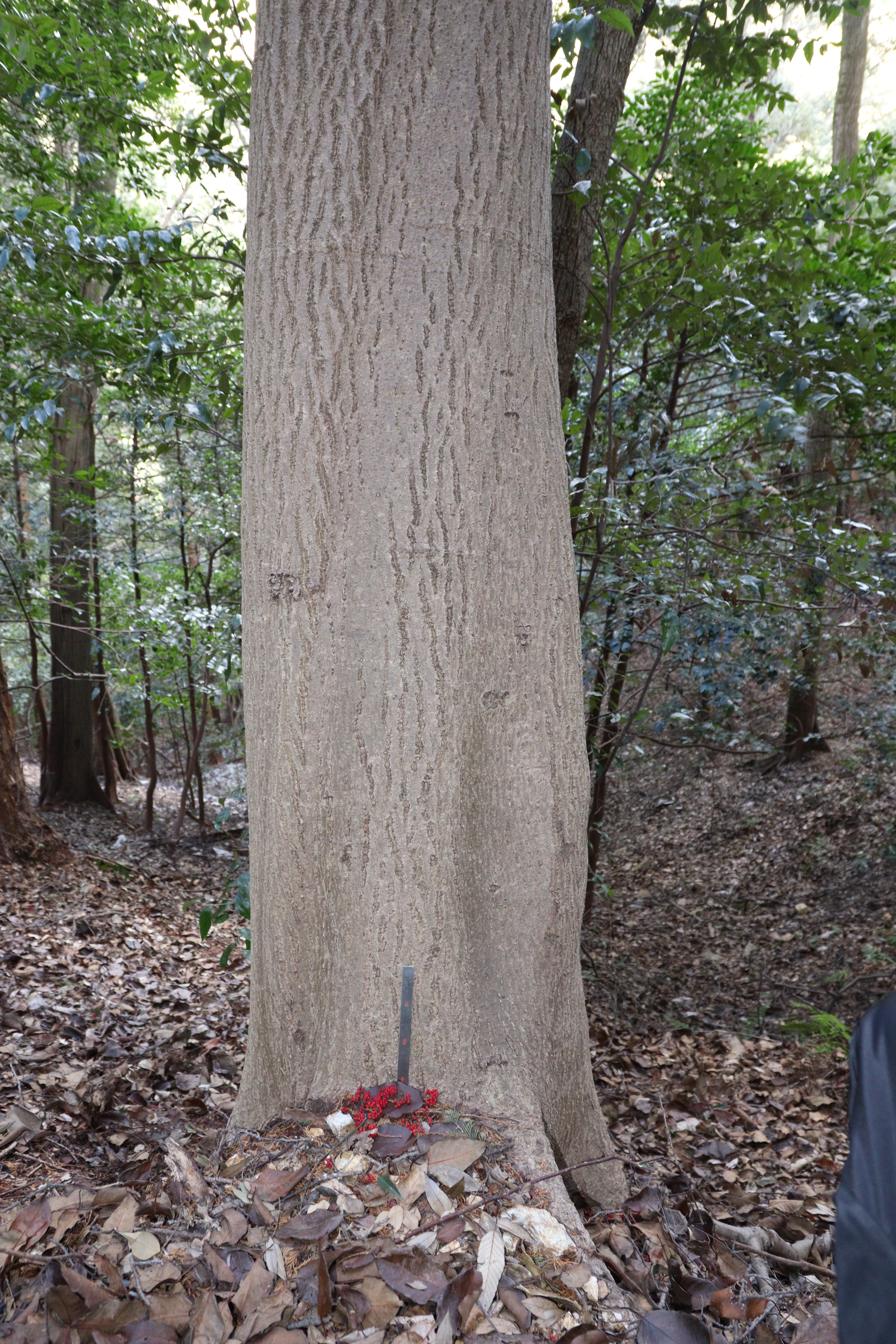
- Trunk

Conservation status
- Least Concern (IUCN 3.1)

Scientific classification
- Kingdom: Plantae
- Clade: Tracheophytes
- Clade: Angiosperms
- Clade: Eudicots
- Clade: Asterids
- Order: Aquifoliales
- Family: Aquifoliaceae
- Genus: Ilex
- Species: I. micrococca

Binomial name
- Ilex micrococca Maxim.

Synonyms
- List: Ilex micrococca var. longifolia Hayata; Ilex micrococca f. luteocarpa H.Ohba & S.Akiyama; Ilex micrococca f. pilosa S.Y.Hu; Ilex micrococca var. polyneura Hand.-Mazz.; Ilex micrococca f. tsangii T.R.Dudley; Ilex polyneura (Hand.-Mazz.) S.Y.Hu; Ilex polyneura var. glabra S.Y.Hu; Ilex pseudogodajam Franch.

= Ilex micrococca =

Species of plant

Ilex micrococca, (syn. Ilex polyneura) the thin-leaf holly, is a widespread species of flowering plant in the family Aquifoliaceae. It is native to Tibet, southern China, Hainan, Taiwan, northern Myanmar, Peninsular Malaysia, Vietnam, and Japan. A deciduous tree reaching 20 m (66 ft), it is found in evergreen broadleaf mountain forests from 500 to 1,900 m (1,600 to 6,200 ft) in elevation.

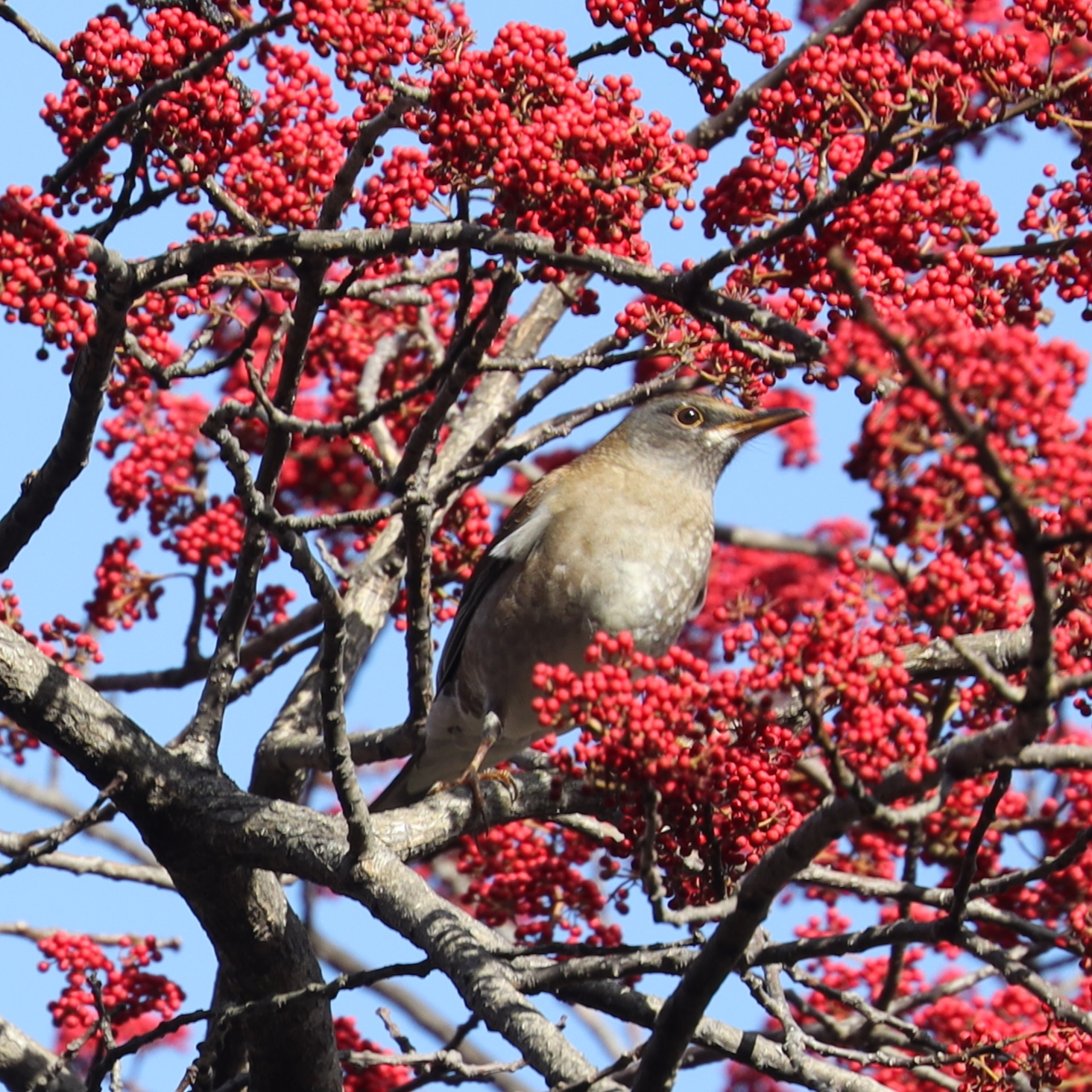
A pale thrush (Turdus pallidus) among the fruit

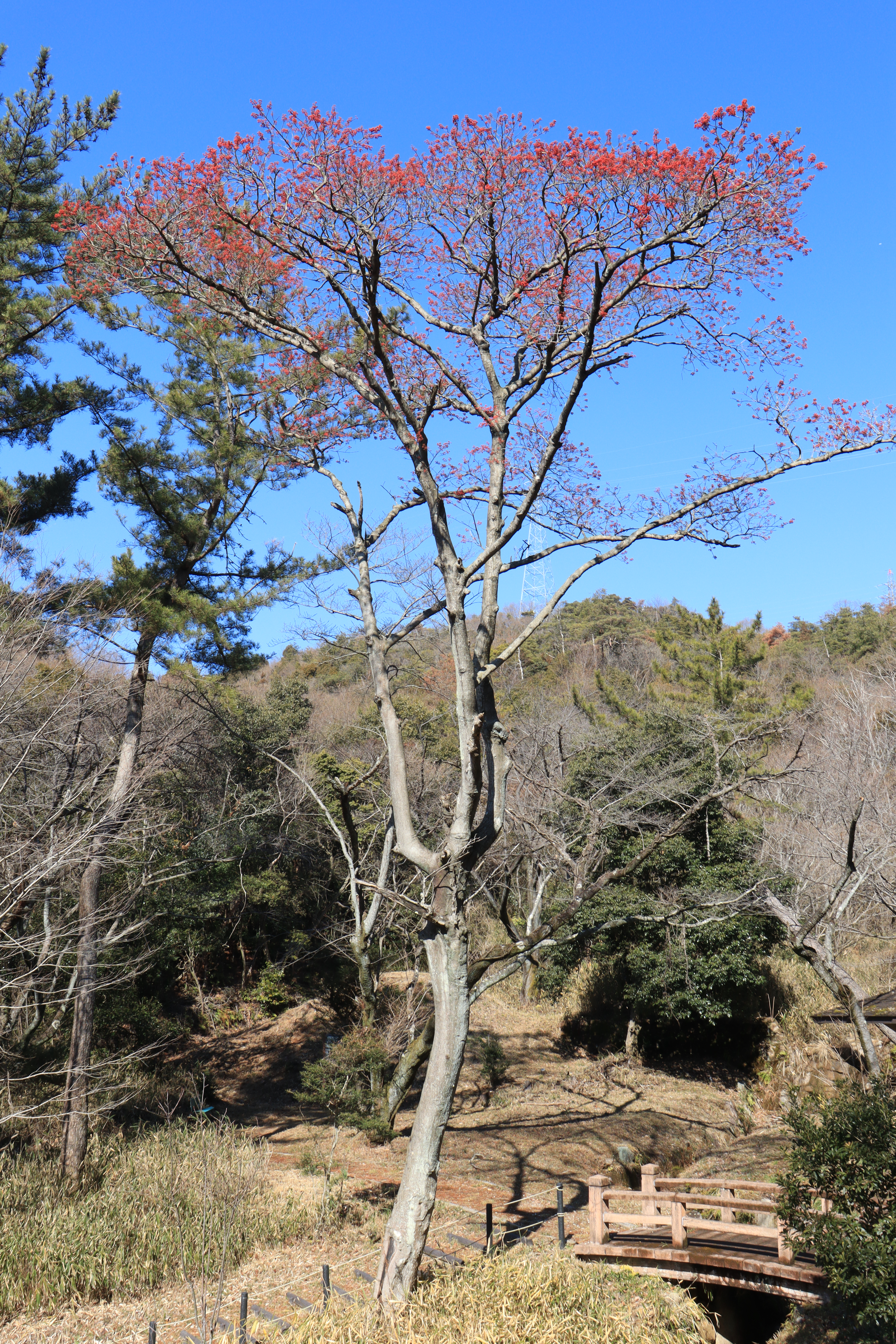
Near a footbridge in Japan

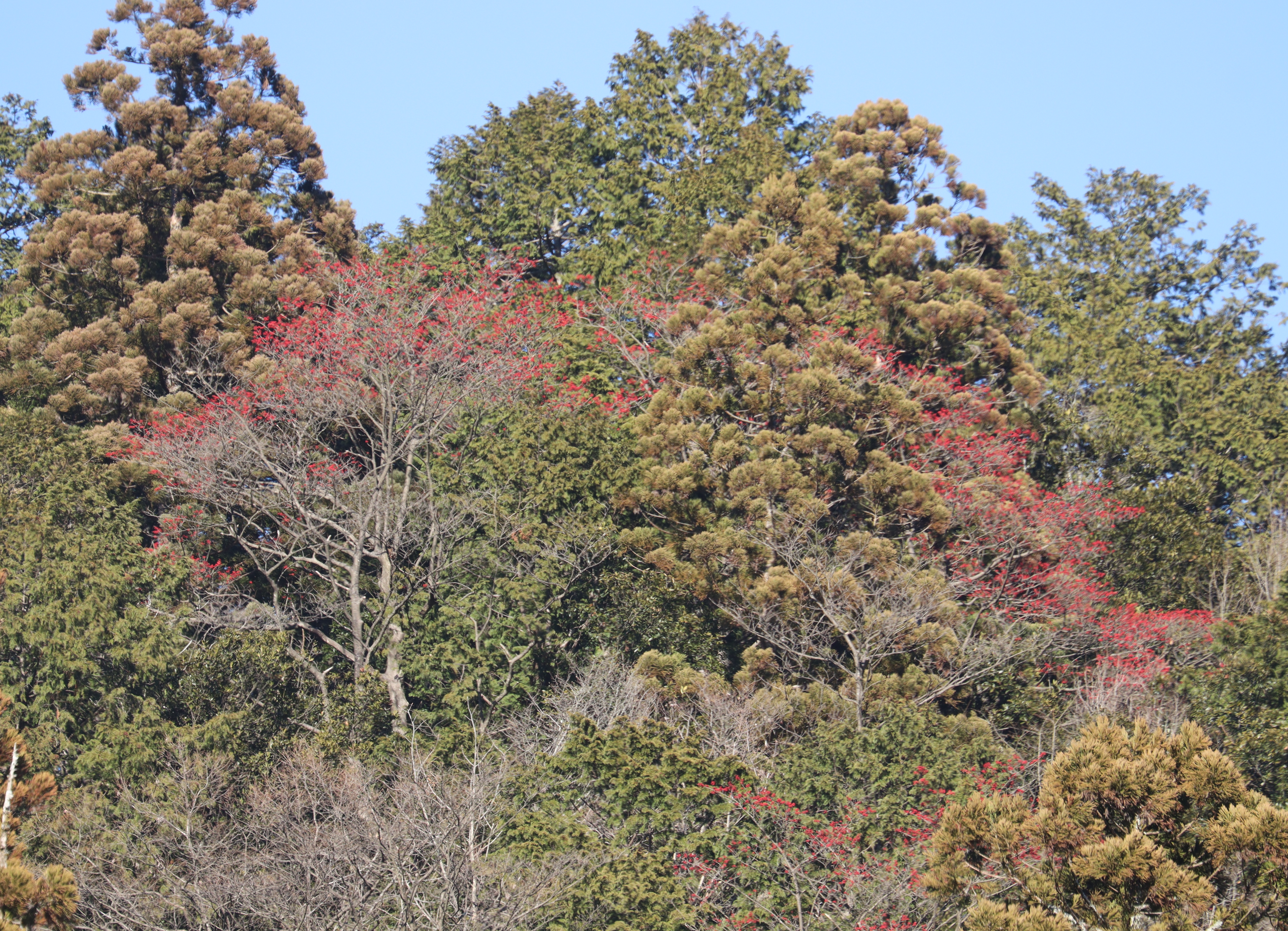
Individuals in a forest in Japan
