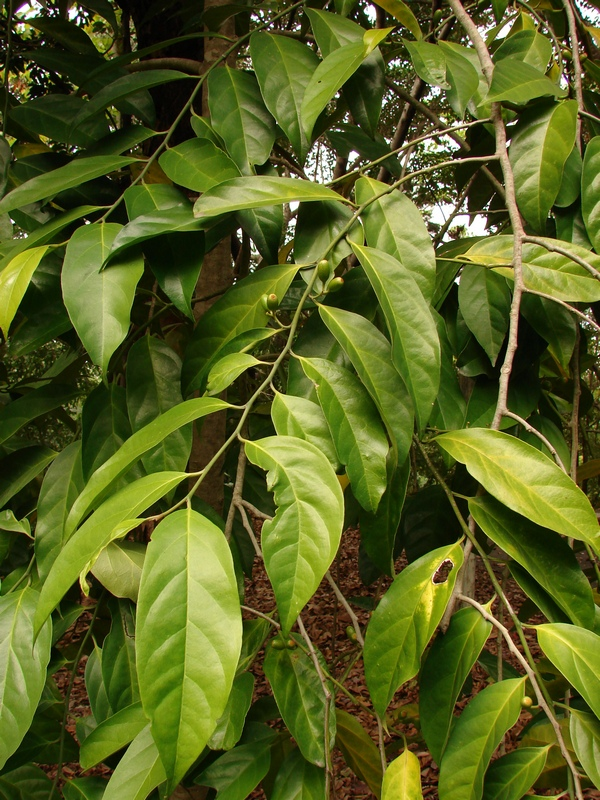
- Gomphandra australiana

Scientific classification
- Kingdom: Plantae
- Clade: Tracheophytes
- Clade: Angiosperms
- Clade: Eudicots
- Clade: Asterids
- Order: Aquifoliales
- Family: Stemonuraceae
- Genus: Gomphandra; Wall. ex Lindl.

= Gomphandra =

Genus of plants

Gomphandra is a genus of plant in family Stemonuraceae. They are dioecious trees or shrubs. The genus includes 45 accepted species, which range from India through Indochina to southern China and Taiwan, and through Malaysia, Indonesia, and the Philippines to New Guinea, Queensland, and the Solomon Islands.

== Species ==
The following 45 species are accepted by Plants of the World Online as of May 2026:

- Gomphandra apoensis (Elmer) Merr.
- Gomphandra australiana F.Muell.
- Gomphandra bracteata Schori
- Gomphandra cambodiana Pierre ex Gagnep.
- Gomphandra capitulata (Jungh. & de Vriese) Becc.
- Gomphandra coi Schori
- Gomphandra comosa King
- Gomphandra conklinii Schori
- Gomphandra coriacea Wight
- Gomphandra cumingiana (Miers) Fern.-Vill.
- Gomphandra dinagatensis Schori
- Gomphandra dolichocarpa Merr.
- Gomphandra donnaiensis (Gagnep.) Sleumer
- Gomphandra fernandoi Schori & Utteridge
- Gomphandra flavicarpa (Elmer) Merr.
- Gomphandra fuliginea (Elmer) Merr.
- Gomphandra fusiformis Sleumer
- Gomphandra halconensis Schori
- Gomphandra javanica (Blume) Valeton
- Gomphandra lancifolia Merr.
- Gomphandra laotica Soulad., V.S.Dang & Tagane
- Gomphandra luzoniensis (Merr.) Merr.
- Gomphandra lysipetala Stapf
- Gomphandra mappioides Valeton
- Gomphandra mollis Merr.
- Gomphandra montana (G.Schellenb.) Sleumer
- Gomphandra oblongifolia Merr.
- Gomphandra oligantha Sleumer
- Gomphandra pallida Sleumer
- Gomphandra palustris Schori
- Gomphandra papuana (Becc.) Sleumer
- Gomphandra parviflora (Blume) Valeton
- Gomphandra pseudojavanica Sleumer
- Gomphandra pseudoprasina Sleumer
- Gomphandra psilandra Schori
- Gomphandra quadrifida (Blume) Sleumer
- Gomphandra rarinervis Schori
- Gomphandra sawiensis (Birnie) Sleumer
- Gomphandra schoepfiifolia Sleumer
- Gomphandra simularensis Sleumer
- Gomphandra subrostrata Merr.
- Gomphandra tetrandra (Wall.) Sleumer
- Gomphandra tomentella (Kurz) Mast.
- Gomphandra ultramafiterrestris Schori
- Gomphandra velutina Sleumer
