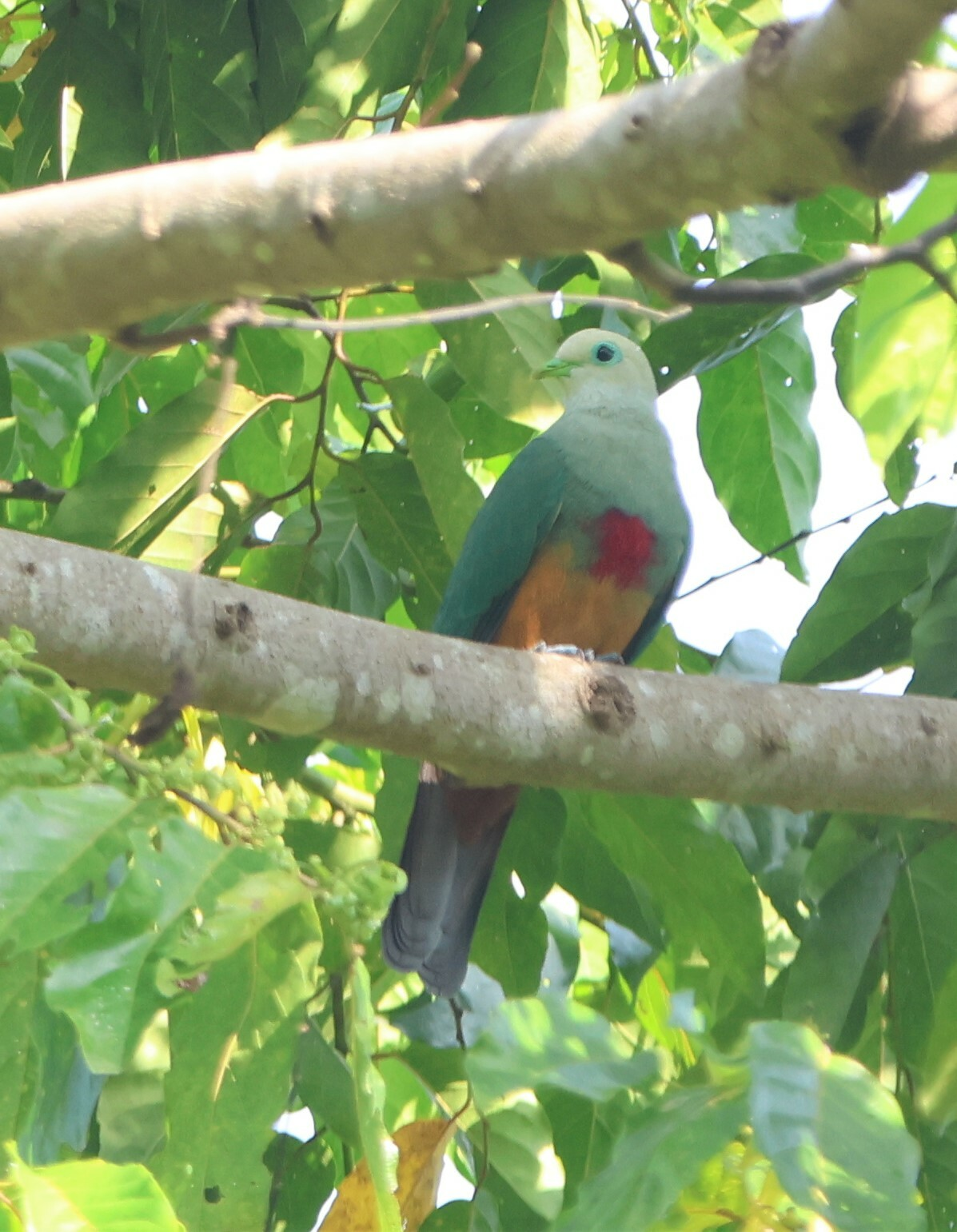

Conservation status
- Least Concern (IUCN 3.1)

Scientific classification
- Kingdom: Animalia
- Phylum: Chordata
- Class: Aves
- Order: Columbiformes
- Family: Columbidae
- Genus: Megaloprepia
- Species: M. formosa

Binomial name
- Megaloprepia formosa (Gray, GR, 1861)

Synonyms
- Ptilinopus bernsteinii (protonym)

= Scarlet-breasted fruit dove =

Species of bird

The scarlet-breasted fruit dove (Megaloprepia formosa) is a species of bird in the family Columbidae. It is endemic to Indonesia, where it occurs in the northern Moluccas. Its natural habitat is subtropical or tropical moist lowland forests. It is rated as a species of least concern on the International Union for Conservation of Nature Red List of Endangered Species. In 1863 Hermann Schlegel named the new species for one of his collectors, Heinrich Agathon Bernstein.

== Taxonomy ==
The scarlet-breasted fruit dove was formerly described and illustrated in 1863 as Ptilinopus bernsteinii by the German naturalist Hermann Schlegel based on a specimen collected by Heinrich Agathon Bernstein in the Bacan Islands, part of the Maluku Islands of Indonesia. Schlegel chose the specific epithet to honour the collector. The English zoologist George Gray had described the scarlet-breasted fruit dove in 1861 as Carpophaga (Megaloprepia) formosa, but Gray also introduced a different species as Ptilonopus formosus on the same page of his article. The error was noticed by Schlegel and by Alfred Russel Wallace. Under the rules of the International Code of Zoological Nomenclature, Gray's formosa is a junior secondary homonym and is permanently invalid.

The scarlet-breasted fruit dove was formerly placed in the genus Ptilinopus. A molecular genetic study published in 2014 found that the fruit dove genus Ptilinopus was paraphyletic. In order to create monophyletic genera, nine species were moved from Ptilinopus to Ramphiculus and two species, the scarlet-breasted fruit dove and the wompoo fruit dove, were moved from Ptilinopus to Megaloprepia . The name Megaloprepia is from Ancient Greek μεγαλοπρεπεια/megaloprepeia meaning "magnificence".

Two subspecies are recognised:

- M. f. micra Jany, E, 1955 – Obi Island (north-central Moluccas)
- M. f. formosa (Gray, GR, 1861) – northern Moluccas (Halmahera, Ternate, and Bacan Islands)

== Description ==
The scarlet-breasted fruit dove is a small or medium-sized bird, measuring 29 centimetres (11 in) in length. It has a grey head which has a green wash. The rest of the upperparts and breast are bright green in colour. The male is patched with bright scarlet, at the middle of the lower breast. It has an orange-yellow belly, and chestnut undertail coverts. The underwing coverts are also orange-yellow.

== Behaviour and ecology ==
It is presumably a frugivorous species. It is normally quiet, and has been described to emit deep, soft oohoo calls. It also emits odd growling calls. It usually quietly forages alone or in pairs, in forest canopies.

== Status and conservation ==
Since 1988, the scarlet-breasted fruit dove has been rated as a species of least concern on the IUCN Red List of Endangered Species. This is because although it has a restricted range, the range size is more than 20,000 km^{2} (7,700 sq mi) with a stable population trend. In addition, although its population numbers have not been determined, it is thought to be above 10,000, which does not meet the criterion to warrant a vulnerable rating. The species is described as "uncommon to moderately common", and there is no evidence of major threat to their population.
