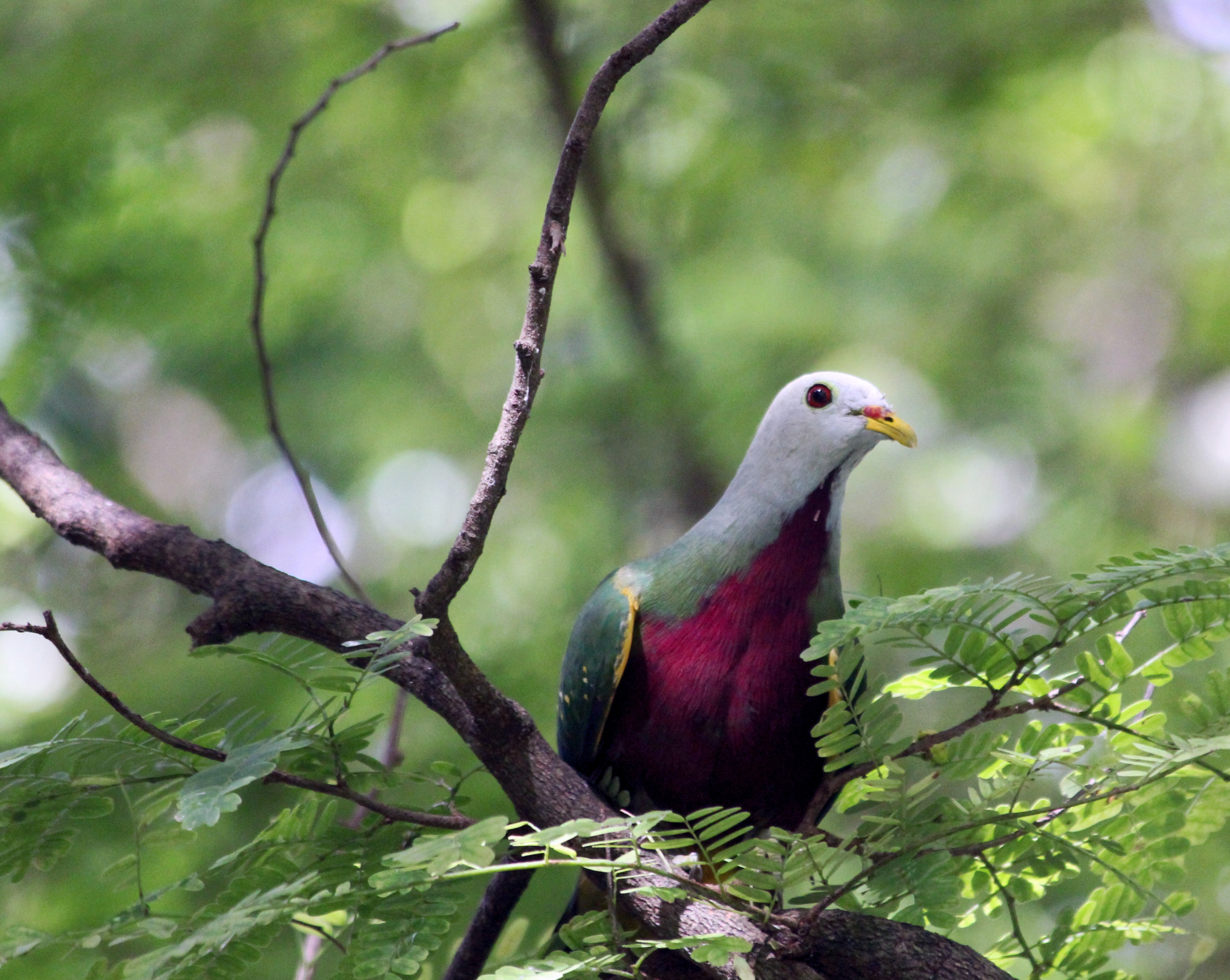
- Wompoo fruit dove Megaloprepia magnifica

Scientific classification
- Kingdom: Animalia
- Phylum: Chordata
- Class: Aves
- Order: Columbiformes
- Family: Columbidae
- Tribe: Ptilinopodini
- Genus: Megaloprepia; Reichenbach, 1853

Type species
- Columba magnifica Temminck, 1821

= Megaloprepia =

Genus of birds

Megaloprepia is a genus of fruit doves in the family Columbidae. These are colourful frugivorous doves that are found in forests and woodlands. The two species now placed in this genus were formerly placed in the genus Ptilinopus.

== Taxonomy ==
The genus Megaloprepia was introduced in 1853 by the German naturalist Ludwig Reichenbach with the type species as Columba magnifica Temminck, the wompoo fruit dove. The genus name is from Ancient Greek μεγαλοπρεπεια/megaloprepeia meaning "magnificence".

The two species placed in this genus were formerly placed with all the other fruit doves in the genus Ptilinopus. A molecular genetic study published in 2014 found that Ptilinopus was paraphyletic. As part of a rearrangement to create monophyletic genera, the scarlet-breasted fruit dove and the wompoo fruit dove were moved from Ptilinopus to Megaloprepia.

The genus contains the following two species:

Image	Common name	Scientific name	Distribution
	Scarlet-breasted fruit dove	Megaloprepia formosa	north Moluccas
	Wompoo fruit dove	Megaloprepia magnifica	New Guinea and some satellites and east Australia
