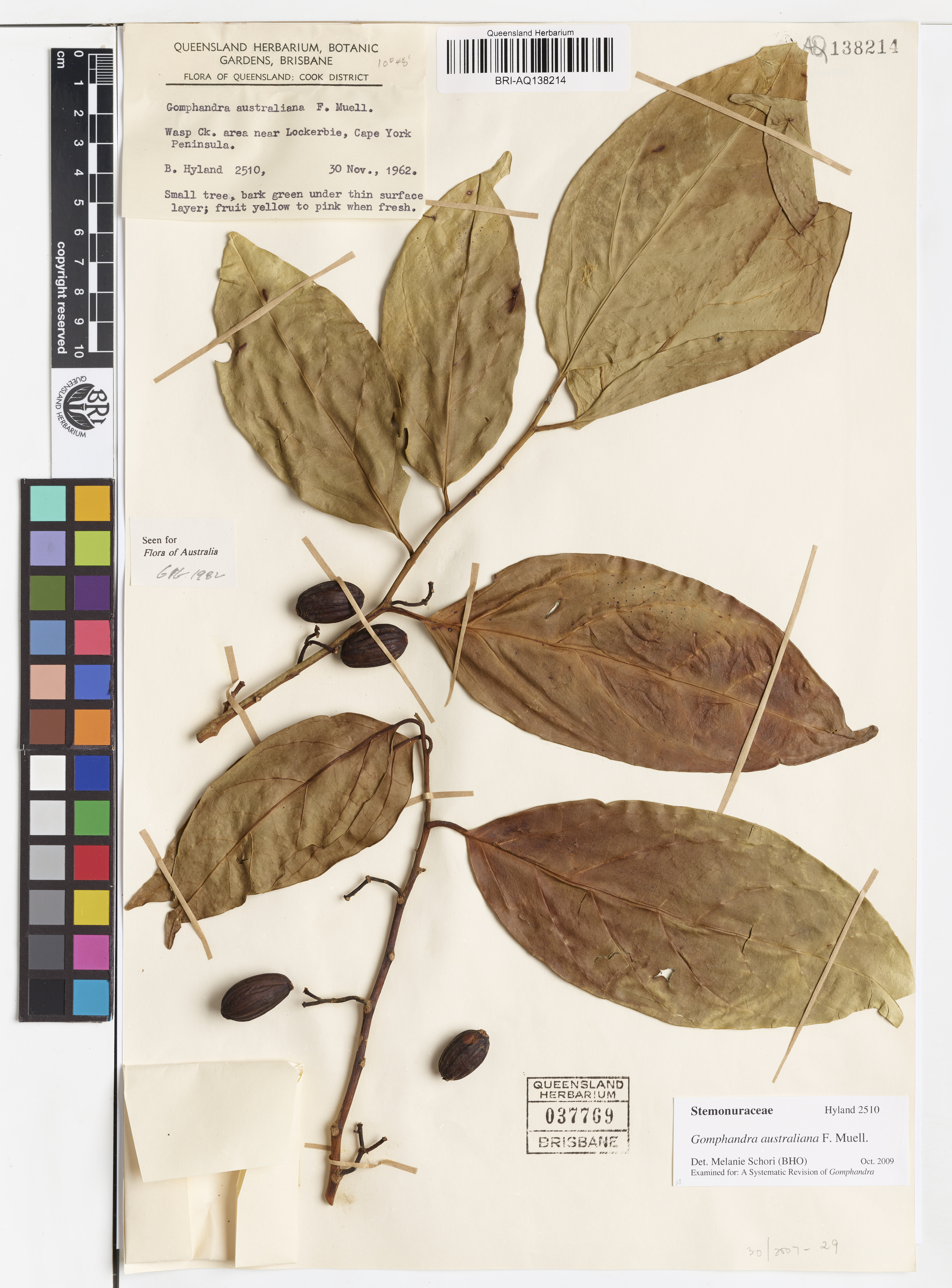

Conservation status
- Least Concern (IUCN 3.1)

Scientific classification
- Kingdom: Plantae
- Clade: Tracheophytes
- Clade: Angiosperms
- Clade: Eudicots
- Clade: Asterids
- Order: Cardiopteridales
- Family: Stemonuraceae
- Genus: Gomphandra
- Species: G. australiana

Binomial name
- Gomphandra australiana F.Muell.

Synonyms
- Stemonurus australianus (F.Muell.) Kuntze; Gomphandra ramuensis (Lauterb.) Sleumer; Gomphandra viridis (G.Schellenb.) Sleumer; Lasianthera australiana F.Muell.; Stemonurus ramuensis Lauterb.; Stemonurus viridis G.Schellenb.

= Gomphandra australiana =

Species of flowering plant

Gomphandra australiana, commonly known as buff beech, is a species of plant in the family Stemonuraceae. It is native to the Maluku Islands, New Guinea and the state of Queensland, Australia.

== Description ==
Gomphandra australiana is a small tree up to 20 m (66 ft) tall and rarely more than 30 cm (12 in) diameter at breast height. The leaves are simple (without lobes or divisions), arranged alternately on the twigs, and measure up to 21 cm (8.3 in) long and 9 cm (3.5 in) wide. They are glossy on both sides, dark green above and paler below, and they have 5–9 pairs of veins on either side of the midrib.

Flowers are produced on cymes up to 4 cm (1.6 in) long. They are quite small—the petals are united into a tube about 3 mm (0.12 in) long. The fruits are ellipsoidal drupes, initially green and ripening through pale orange to pink. They are about 2.5 cm (1 in) long and 1.5 cm (0.6 in) wide and contain a single seed.

== Distribution and habitat ==
This species occurs in eastern Queensland from about Townsville to the top of Cape York Peninsula, and also occurs in New Guinea. It grows in tropical rainforest as an understory tree, at altitudes from sea level to about 300 m (980 ft).

== Conservation status ==
It has been given the status of least concern by both the International Union for Conservation of Nature and the Queensland Government.

== Gallery ==
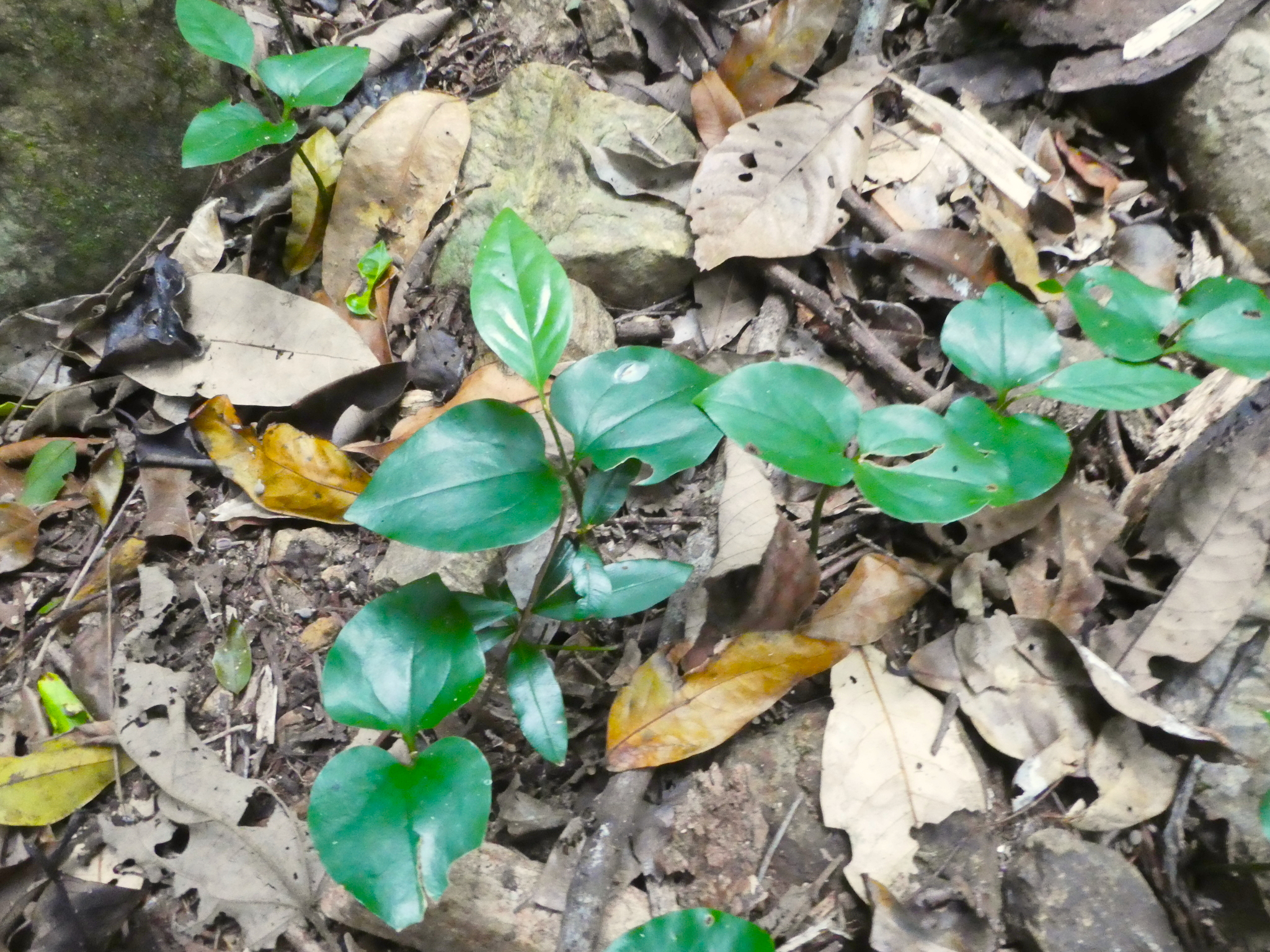
Seedlings

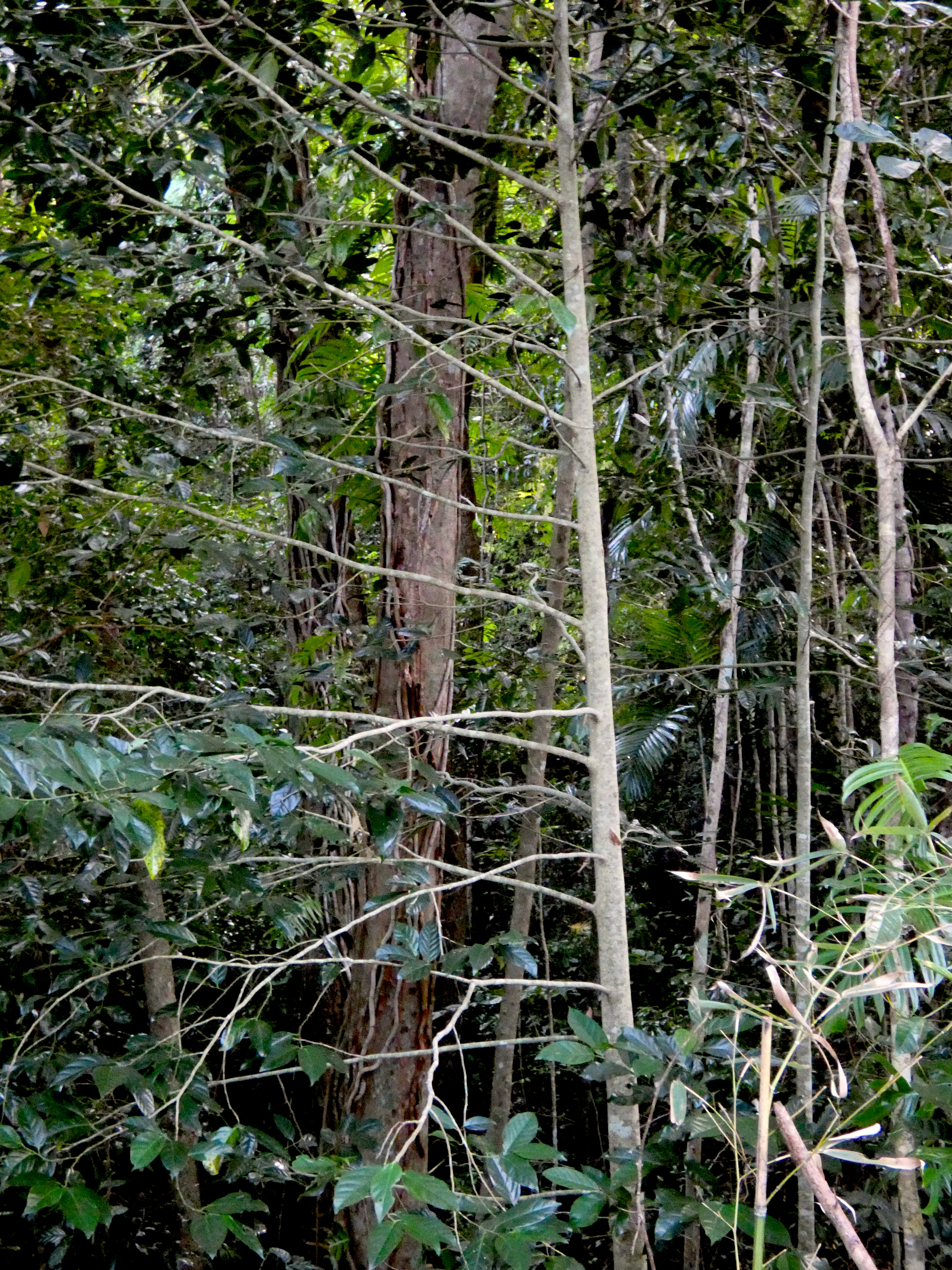
Pale trunk

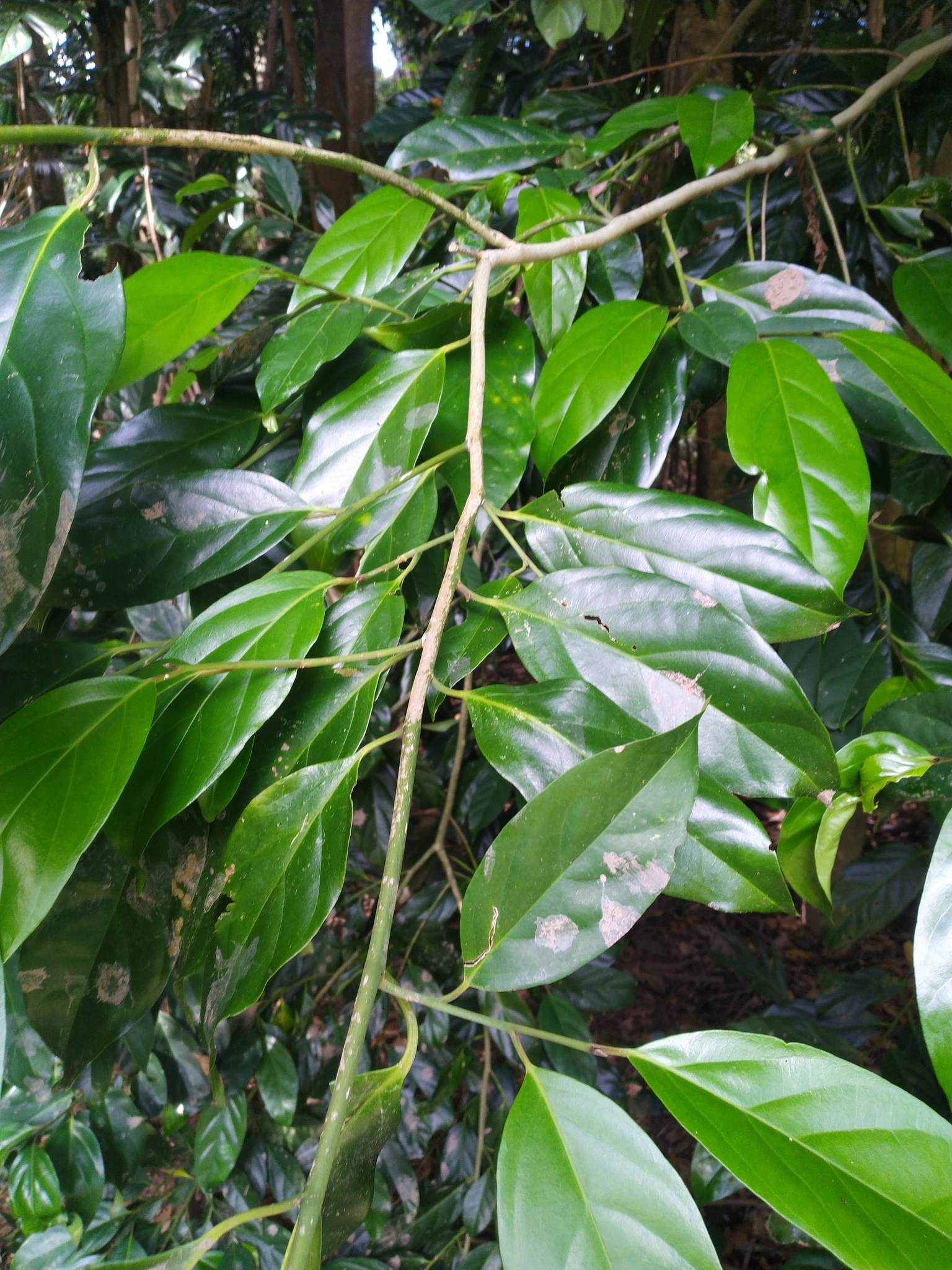
Foliage

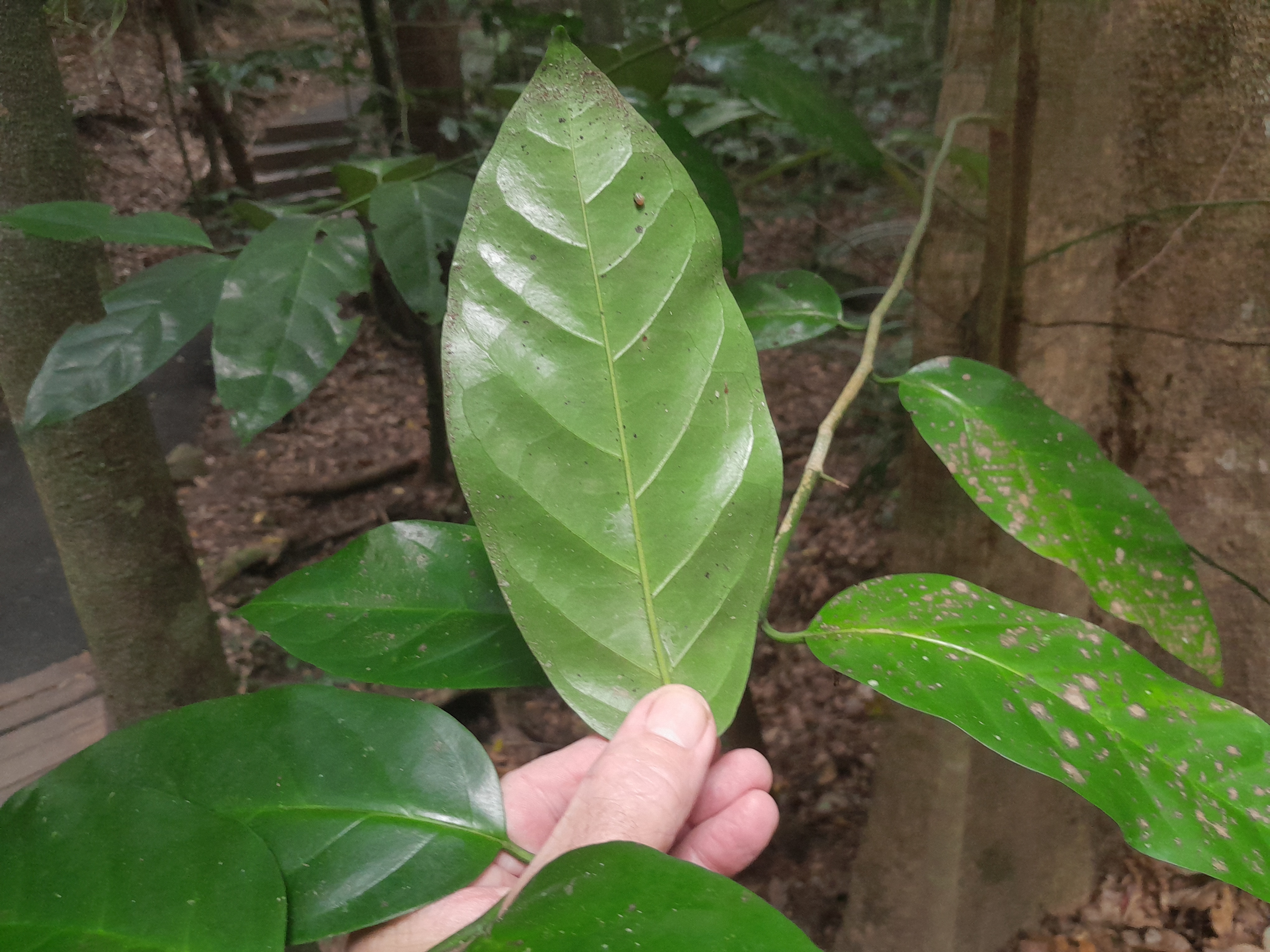
Underside of leaf

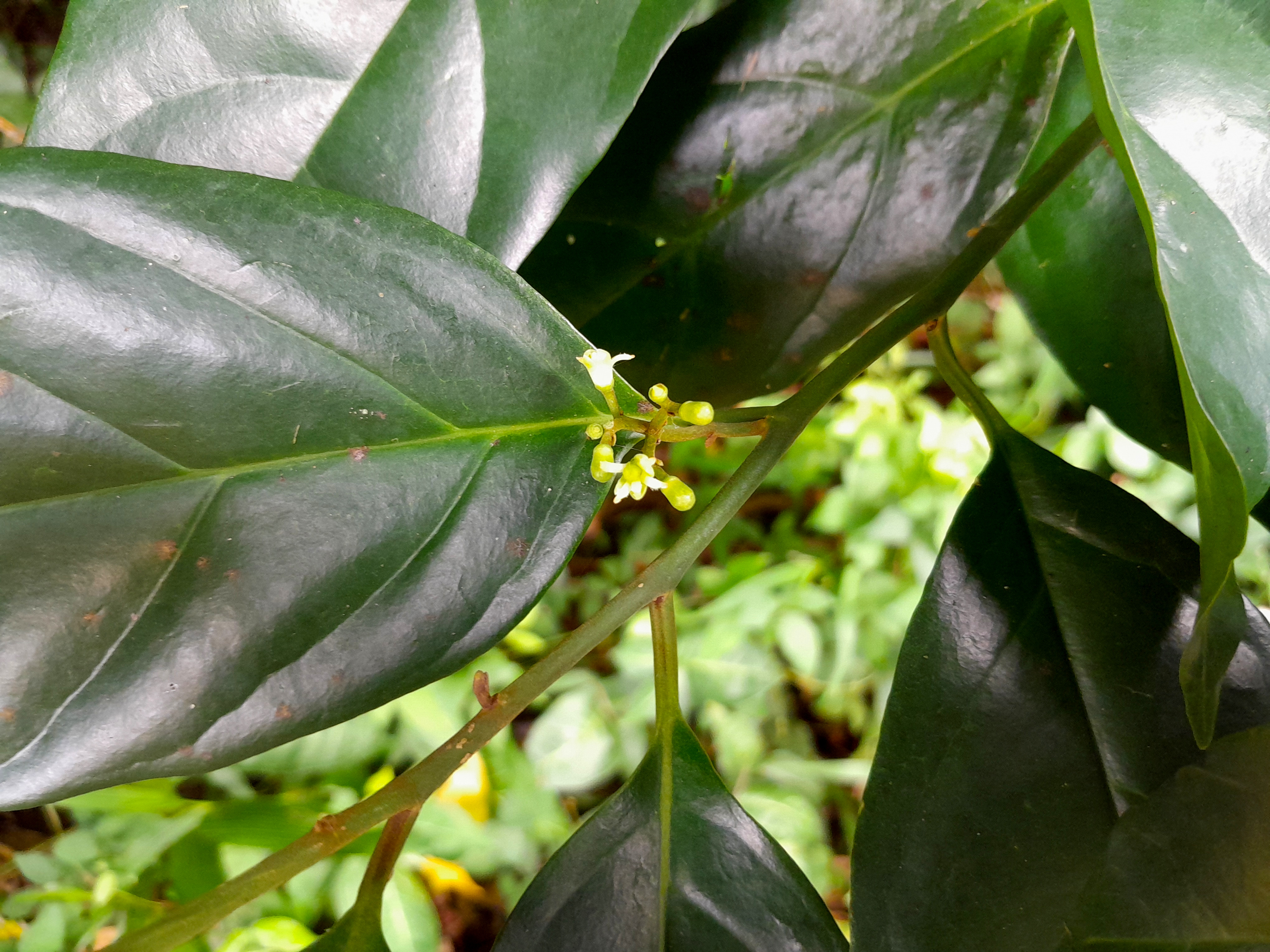
Flowers

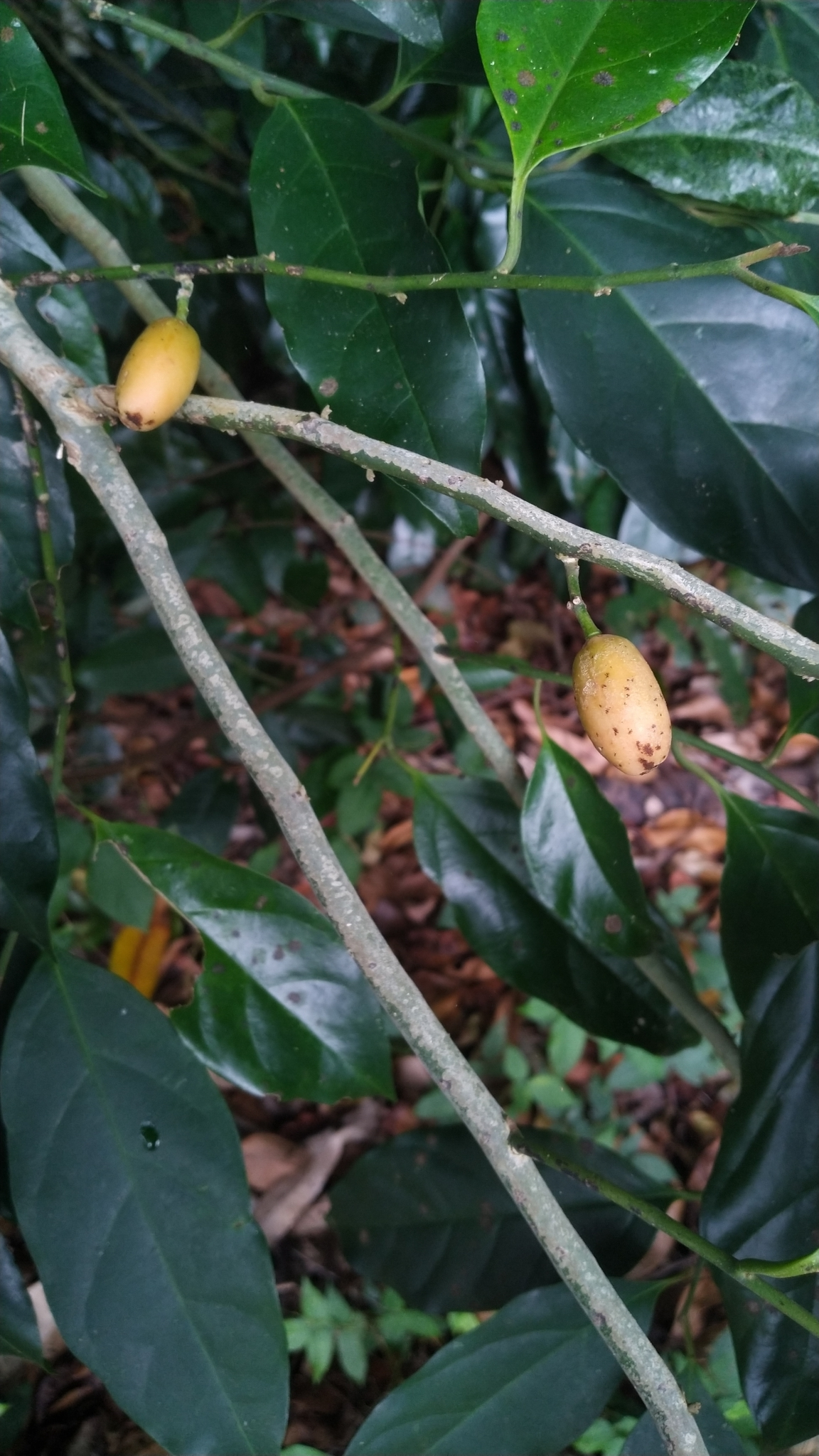
Fruit
