= Xylosma serrata =

Conservation status
- Critically endangered, possibly extinct (IUCN 3.1)

Scientific classification
- Kingdom: Plantae
- Clade: Tracheophytes
- Clade: Angiosperms
- Clade: Eudicots
- Clade: Rosids
- Order: Malpighiales
- Family: Salicaceae
- Genus: Xylosma
- Species: X. serrata

Binomial name
- Xylosma serrata (Sw.) Krug & Urb.

Synonyms
- Lightfootia serrata Sw.; Myroxylon serratum (Sw.) Krug & Urb.; Prockia serrata (Sw.) Willd.; Thiodia serrata (Sw.) Endl.

Species of flowering plant

Xylosma serrata, the brushholly, is a species of flowering plant in the family Salicaceae. It is endemic to the island of Montserrat. It was known from only a single location on the south of the island, and this has now been covered by pyroclastic flows from the volcanic eruption. It is therefore possibly extinct, but assessed by the IUCN as critically endangered because of the lack of data.

== See also ==
- Flora of Montserrat
