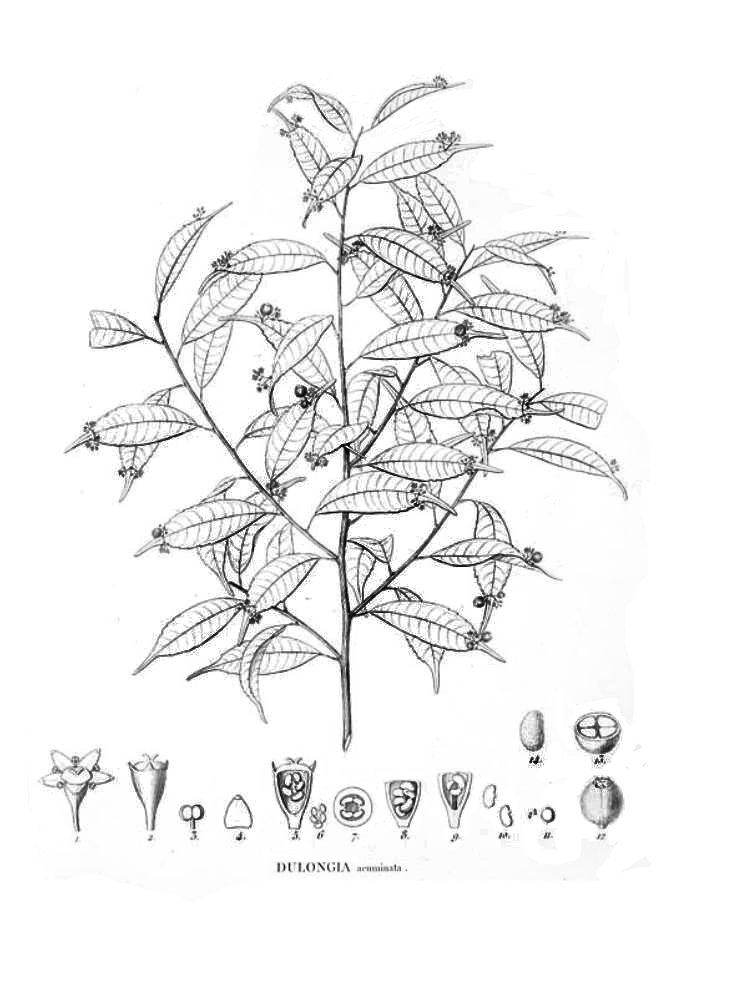
- Phyllonoma ruscifolia

Scientific classification
- Kingdom: Plantae
- Clade: Tracheophytes
- Clade: Angiosperms
- Clade: Eudicots
- Clade: Asterids
- Order: Aquifoliales
- Family: Phyllonomaceae; Small
- Genus: Phyllonoma; Willd. ex Roem. & Schult.

Species
- Phyllonoma laticuspis (Turcz.) Engl. Phyllonoma ruscifolia Willd. ex Roem. & Schult. Phyllonoma tenuidens Pittier; Phyllonoma weberbaueri Engl.

Synonyms
- Dulongia Kunth

= Phyllonoma =

Genus of flowering plants

Phyllonoma is a genus consisting of four species of trees and shrubs native to South and Central America, from Peru to Mexico. It is the sole genus in the family Phyllonomaceae, syn. Dulongiaceae.

The flowers are produced in epiphyllous inflorescences, as in the Helwingiaceae; usually a pair of flowers at the tip of each leaf.

The APG II classification (2003) places them in the order Aquifoliales, along with the hollies and Helwingiaceae.

In the Cronquist classification (1981) the family Phyllonomaceae was treated as a synonym of the family Grossulariaceae, with the genus Phyllonoma included in it.
