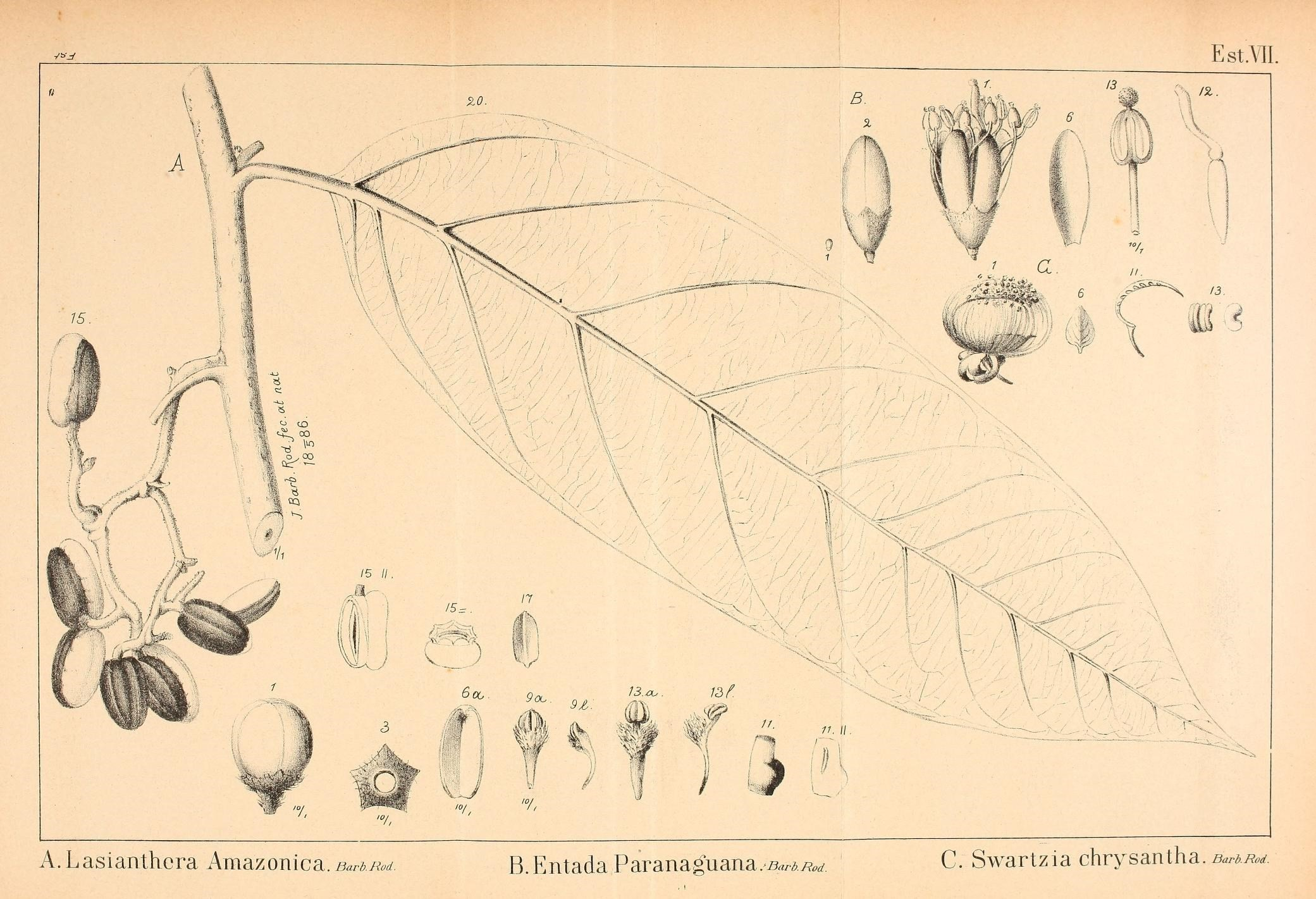
- Fig. A.: Lasianthera amazonica (syn. of Discophora guianensis)

Scientific classification
- Kingdom: Plantae
- Clade: Tracheophytes
- Clade: Angiosperms
- Clade: Eudicots
- Clade: Asterids
- Order: Aquifoliales
- Family: Stemonuraceae
- Genus: Discophora; Miers

Type species
- Discophora guianensis Miers

Species
- Discophora guianensis Miers; Discophora montana R.A.Howard

Synonyms
- Homotypic Synonyms: Kummeria Mart. ex Engl.

= Discophora (plant) =

Genus of flowering plants

Discophora is a genus of trees in the family Stemonuraceae. It is native to Bolivia, Brazil, Colombia, Costa Rica, Ecuador, French Guiana, Guyana, Panamá, Peru, Suriname, and Venezuela.

== Species ==
Accepted species include:

- Discophora guianensis Miers
- Discophora montana R.A.Howard
