= Medusanthera =

Scientific classification
- Kingdom: Plantae
- Clade: Tracheophytes
- Clade: Angiosperms
- Clade: Eudicots
- Clade: Asterids
- Order: Aquifoliales
- Family: Stemonuraceae
- Genus: Medusanthera; Seem.

Genus of plants

Medusanthera is a genus of flowering plants belonging to the family Stemonuraceae.

Its native range is Thailand to Western Pacific.

Species:

- Medusanthera gracilis (King) Sleumer
- Medusanthera howardii Utteridge
- Medusanthera inaequalis Utteridge
- Medusanthera laxiflora (Miers) R.A.Howard
- Medusanthera malayana Utteridge
- Medusanthera megistocarpa Utteridge
- Medusanthera samoensis (Reinecke) R.A.Howard
- Medusanthera vitiensis Seem.
