= Richard A. Howard =

American botanist

- Born: July 1, 1917; Stamford, Connecticut
- Died: September 18, 2003 (aged 86); Cohasset, Massachusetts
- Education: A.B., Miami University, A.M. and Ph.D., Harvard University
- Scientific career
- Author abbrev. (botany): R.A.Howard

Richard Alden Howard (July 1, 1917 – September 18, 2003) was an American botanist and plant taxonomist. Howard, who served as director of Arnold Arboretum between 1954 and 1977, was known for his work in tropical biology and as author of the 6-volume Flora of the Lesser Antilles (1974–1989).

== Early life and education ==
Howard was the elder of two sons born in Stamford, Connecticut, to Charles F. and Augusta Grace Barker Howard and was raised in Warren, Ohio. He received an A.B. from Miami University in 1938 and took up a position as a technician with Irving W. Bailey at Harvard University. Howard worked on the Icacinaceae plant family and in 1939 he received a fellowship which supported his graduate study. He continued to work on the Icacinaceae, receiving his doctorate in 1942. His doctoral thesis was entitled Studies of the Icacinaceae: A monograph of the New World species.

== World War II ==
After graduation, Howard attempted to enlist in the United States Navy, but was rejected because he exceeded their maximum height requirement. He was accepted into the United States Army Air Corps as an Aviation Physiologist. In this capacity he organized and ran the Jungle Survival Program of the School of Applied Tactics at Orlando, Florida, a program which later developed into the Air-Sea Rescue Service. He wrote survival manuals and left the service with the rank of captain. Howard was awarded the Legion of Merit in 1947 for his work in this program.
