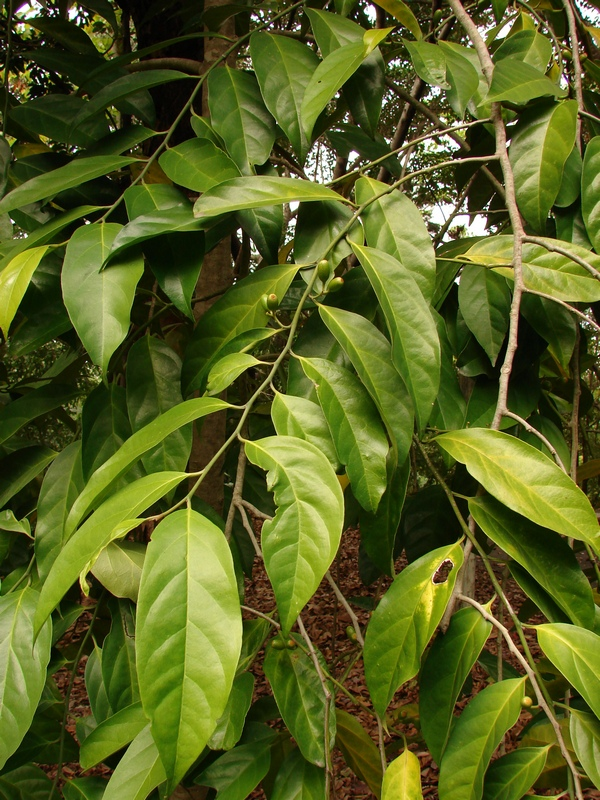
- Gomphandra australiana, Buff Beech, Mt. Coot-tha Botanic garden, Brisbane, Australia, 24 July 2010 by Tatiana Gerus

Scientific classification
- Kingdom: Plantae
- Clade: Tracheophytes
- Clade: Angiosperms
- Clade: Eudicots
- Clade: Asterids
- Order: Aquifoliales
- Family: Stemonuraceae; Kårehed

Genera
- See text

= Stemonuraceae =

Family of flowering plants

Stemonuraceae is a eudicot family of flowering plants.

== Genera ==
This listing was sourced from the Angiosperm Phylogeny Website and Royal Botanic Gardens, Kew

- Cantleya Ridley
- Codiocarpus R.A.Howard
- Discophora Miers
- Gastrolepis Tiegh.
- Gomphandra Wall. ex Lindley
- Grisollea Baillon
- Hartleya Sleumer
- Irvingbaileya R.A.Howard
- syn.: Kummeria Martius = Discophora Miers
- Lasianthera P.Beauv.
- Medusanthera Seem.
- Stemonurus Blume
- syn.: Tylecarpus Engler = Medusanthera Seem.
- syn.: Urandra Thwaites = Stemonurus Blume
- Whitmorea Sleumer
