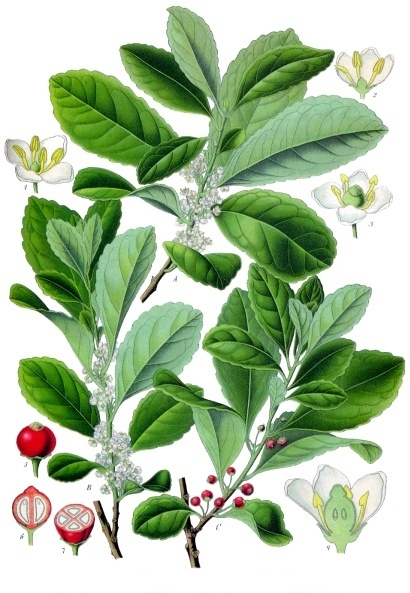
- Yerba mate

Scientific classification
- Kingdom: Plantae
- Clade: Tracheophytes
- Clade: Angiosperms
- Clade: Eudicots
- Clade: Asterids
- Clade: Campanulids
- Order: Aquifoliales; Senft

Families
- Aquifoliaceae; Helwingiaceae; Phyllonomaceae

= Aquifoliales =

Aquifoliales Temporal range: Turonian–recent

Order of flowering plants

The Aquifoliales are an order of flowering plants, including the Aquifoliaceae (holly) family, and also the Helwingiaceae (2-5 species of temperate Asian shrubs) and the Phyllonomaceae (4 species of Central American trees and shrubs). In 2001, the families Stemonuraceae and Cardiopteridaceae were added to this order, though the Angiosperm Phylogeny Group later reclassified them as a distinct order, Cardiopteridales. In the Cronquist system, there is no Aquifoliales order: the Aquifoliaceae are placed within the order Celastrales and the others are in other families.
