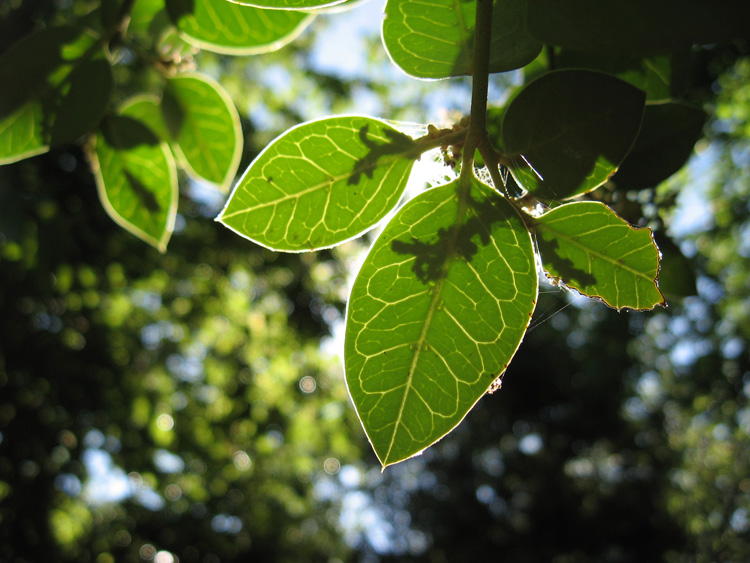

Conservation status
- Vulnerable (IUCN 3.1)

Scientific classification
- Kingdom: Plantae
- Clade: Tracheophytes
- Clade: Angiosperms
- Clade: Eudicots
- Clade: Asterids
- Order: Aquifoliales
- Family: Cardiopteridaceae
- Genus: Citronella
- Species: C. mucronata

Binomial name
- Citronella mucronata (Ruiz & Pav.) D.Don

Synonyms
- Villaresia mucronata Ruiz & Pav.; Citronella chilensis (Molina) R.A.Howard ex Muñoz; Villaresia chilensis (Molina) Stuntz; Villaresia gongonha var. pungens (Miers) Engl.; Villaresia mucronata var. laeta Miers; Villaresia pungens Miers; Citrus chilensis Molina

= Citronella mucronata =

Species of tree

Citronella mucronata, the huillipatagua (Spanish pronunciation: [wiʝipaˈtaɣwa]), naranjillo, or Chilean citronella tree, is an evergreen tree in the family Cardiopteridaceae. It is endemic to Chile and grows in the Chilean matorral region of central Chile from 30º to 40° south latitude.

== Description ==
It reaches up to 10 m (30 ft) and 1 m (3 ft) in diameter. The bark is dark gray and rough. The leaves are alternate, leathery, the edge is entire or toothed, ovate or oblong with an acute apex (tip) which ends in a mucro (sharp point). The leaves are about 4.5–6 cm (1.8–2.4 in) long and 2.5–4 cm (0.98–1.6 in) wide, with domatia in the axils of the side veins, and the veins are yellow, the leaves are glossy green above, and paler below. Small petioles. The flowers are hermaphrodite and whitish yellow and arranged in terminal panicles 4–8 cm (1.6–3.1 in) long. The calyx is made up by 5 sepals, the corolla has 5 free petals. The fruit is a spherical drupe about 1–1.2 cm (0.39–0.47 in) in diameter which is purple when mature.

== Range and habitat ==
Citronella mucronata is native to the Mediterranean climate Chilean matorral ecoregion, and grows discontinuously from Limari Province (30°40'S) to Osorno Province (40°30'S), between 15 and 1,050 meters (49 and 3,445 ft) elevation. It is common in the Chilean Coastal Range, and less common to the east in the foothills of the Andes.

It generally grows in sclerophyllous forest, most frequently in the Roble–Hualo forest type, where it can grow with Nothofagus dombeyi and Nothofagus alpina depending on the latitude. In northern coastal habitats it is often associated with Aextoxicon punctatum, Beilschmiedia miersii, Cryptocarya alba, and Schinus latifolia. In Los Bellotos del Melado National Reserve in the Andes it grows with Beilschmiedia berteroana, Cryptocarya alba, Nothofagus glauca, and Quillaja saponaria.

== Conservation ==
Although Citronella mucronata has an extensive north–south range, it is threatened by the extensive habitat loss which has occurred throughout its range, particularly in the Coastal Range where deforestation and habitat fragmentation are severe. Subpopulations of the species are increasingly isolated from one another, with the longest distance between them 122 km (Fray Jorge National Park and Los Vilos).

The National Forest Corporation has objected to the establishment of a rare-earth mining project in Penco citing the conservation of Citronella mucronata as reason. The forest in the project area were decimated by the 2026 Chilean wildfires leading to accusations that the fires in that area were intentional to pave the way for the approval of the mining project.
