= Beilschmiedia micranthopsis =

Scientific classification
- Kingdom: Plantae
- Clade: Tracheophytes
- Clade: Angiosperms
- Clade: Magnoliids
- Order: Laurales
- Family: Lauraceae
- Genus: Beilschmiedia
- Species: B. micranthopsis

Binomial name
- Beilschmiedia micranthopsis Kosterm.

Species of tree

Beilschmiedia micranthopsis is an Asian tree species in the family Lauraceae. Records of occurrence are from Vietnam, where it may be called két hoa nhỏ; no subspecies are listed in the Catalogue of Life.
