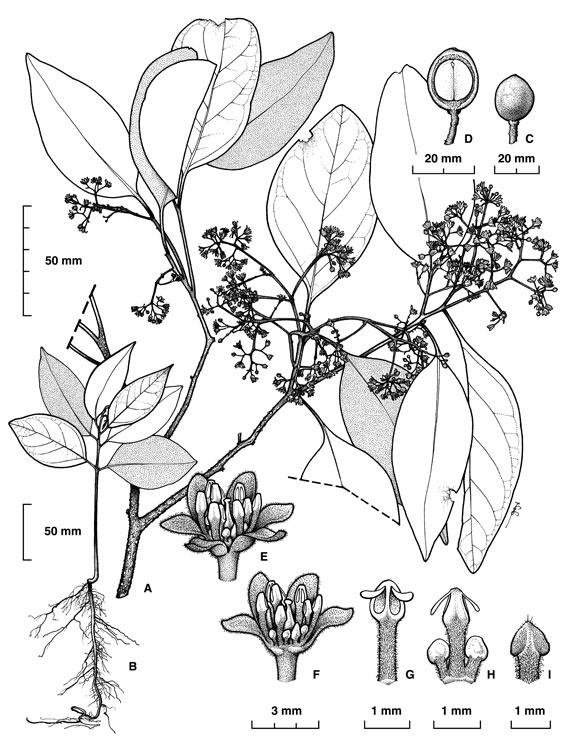
- Botanical sketch

Conservation status
- Least Concern (IUCN 3.1)

Scientific classification
- Kingdom: Plantae
- Clade: Embryophytes
- Clade: Tracheophytes
- Clade: Angiosperms
- Clade: Magnoliids
- Order: Laurales
- Family: Lauraceae
- Genus: Beilschmiedia
- Species: B. brunnea

Binomial name
- Beilschmiedia brunnea B.Hyland
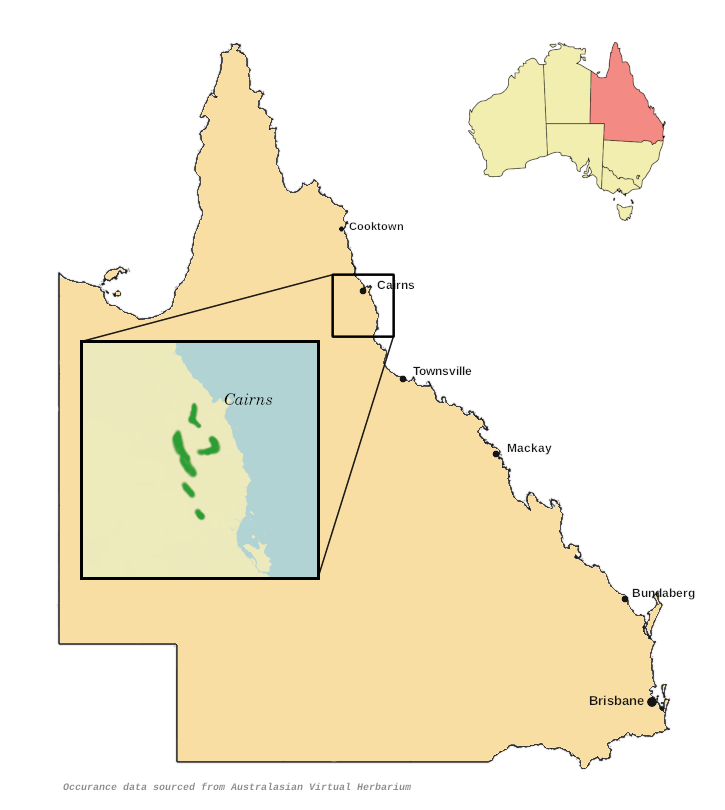

= Beilschmiedia brunnea =

Species of flowering plant

Beilschmiedia brunnea, commonly known as brown walnut, is a species of plant in the family Lauraceae first described in 1989. It is a large tree native to northeast Queensland, Australia, and has a conservation status of least concern.

== Description ==
Beilschmiedia brunnea is a buttressed tree reaching up to 35 m (115 ft) in height and 100 cm (40 in) diameter. The leaves are attached to the twigs with a petiole about 20 mm (0.79 in) long; the leaf blades average about 9 cm (3.5 in) long and 5 cm (2.0 in) wide. They have four or five veins on either side of the midrib and the leaf underside is glaucous (chalky green) in colour.

The inflorescence is a panicle which emerges from the leaf axils. The scented flowers are pale green to pale brown, with two whorls of finely-hairy tepals about 3 mm (0.12 in) long. There are nine stamens and three staminodes (sterile stamens), all about 2.5–3 mm (0.10–0.12 in) long. The ovary is sessile or nearly so, and may be up to 1 mm (0.04 in) wide.

The fruit is a black drupe up to 22 mm (0.9 in) long and 17 mm (0.7 in) wide. The flesh is yellow and it contains a single brown seed about 14 mm (0.6 in) long and wide.

== Distribution and habitat ==
It grows in mature upland rainforest from the Clohesy River west of Kuranda, south across the Atherton Tableland to Koombooloomba National Park and west to Ravenshoe, at altitudes from 500 to 1,100 m (1,600 to 3,600 ft). It prefers soils based on granite and basalt.

== Taxonomy ==
This species was described in 1989 by Australian botanist Bernard Hyland. It was published in his 232-page paper A Revision of Lauraceae in Australia (excluding Cassytha).

== Conservation ==
This species is listed as least concern in the Queensland Government's WildNet database, and by the International Union for Conservation of Nature.

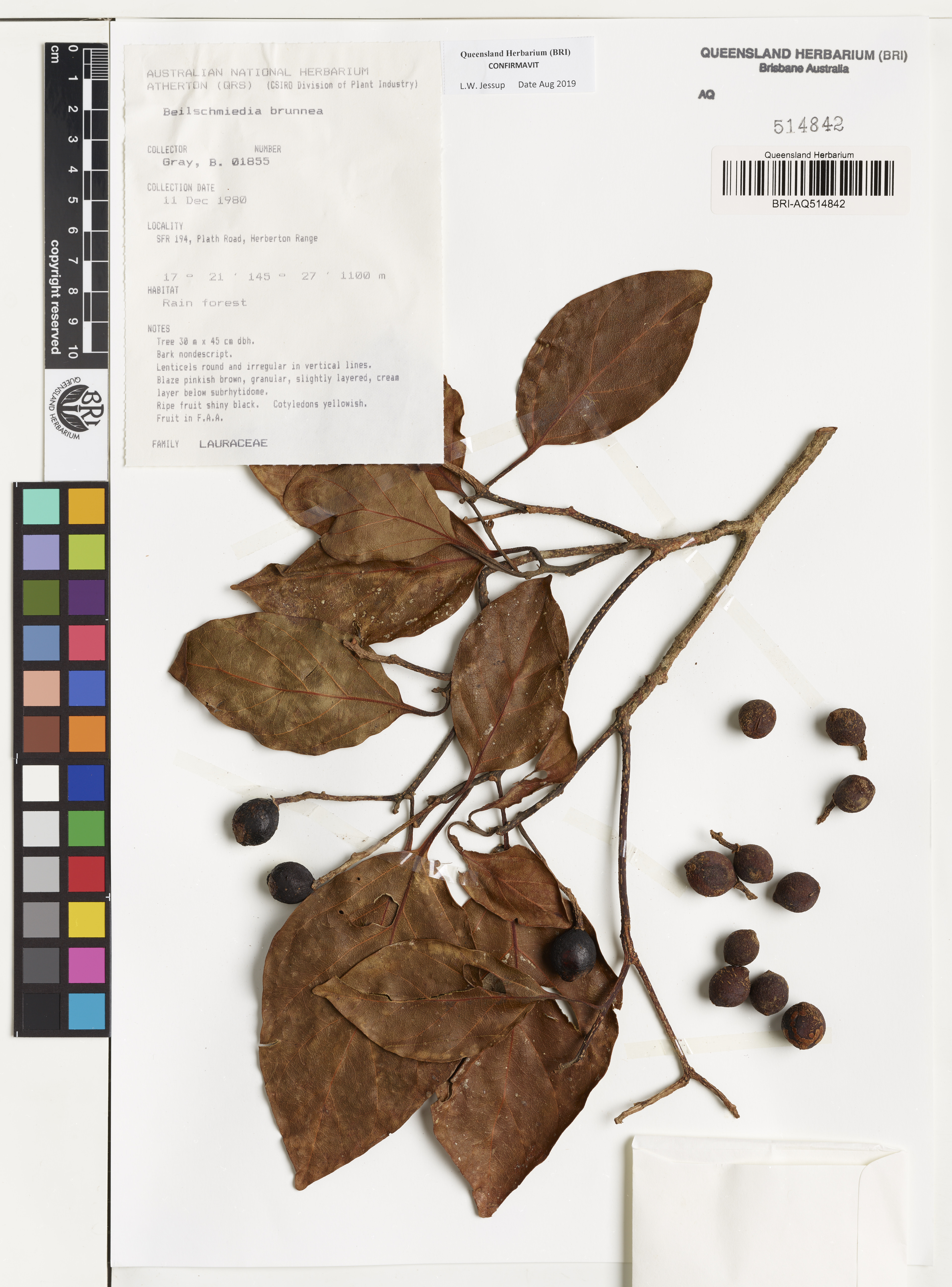
Herbaium specimen
