= Beilschmiedia roxburghiana =

Conservation status
- Least Concern (IUCN 3.1)

Scientific classification
- Kingdom: Plantae
- Clade: Tracheophytes
- Clade: Angiosperms
- Clade: Magnoliids
- Order: Laurales
- Family: Lauraceae
- Genus: Beilschmiedia
- Species: B. roxburghiana

Binomial name
- Beilschmiedia roxburghiana Nees

Synonyms
- Beilschmiedia brevipetiolata (H.Liu) Kosterm.; Beilschmiedia fagifolia Nees; Beilschmiedia glomerata var. tonkinensis Lecomte; Beilschmiedia obovalifoliosa Lecomte; Beilschmiedia pahangensis Gamble; Beilschmiedia pseudomicropora (Purkay. & Narayan.) Kosterm.; Beilschmiedia roxburghiana f. brevipetiolata H.Liu; Beilschmiedia roxburghiana var. fagifolia (Nees) Kosterm.; Beilschmiedia tonkinensis (Lecomte) Ridl.; Beilschmiedia undulata Miq.; Dehaasia undulata Teijsm. & Binn. ex Miq.; Laurus bilocularis Roxb.; Laurus bilocularis Roxb.; Purkayasthaea pseudomicropora Purkay. & Narayan.; Tetranthera fagifolia Wall.

Species of flowering plant

Beilschmiedia roxburghiana is the type species of the tree genus Beilschmiedia in the family Lauraceae. Its native range is from India and the Himalayas through mainland Indo-China to Peninsular Malaysia. In Vietnam it may be called chắp chại or bạch mi; no subspecies are listed in the Catalogue of Life.

The species was described by Christian Gottfried Daniel Nees von Esenbeck in 1831.
