= Beilschmiedia penangiana =

Conservation status
- Vulnerable (IUCN 3.1)

Scientific classification
- Kingdom: Plantae
- Clade: Tracheophytes
- Clade: Angiosperms
- Clade: Magnoliids
- Order: Laurales
- Family: Lauraceae
- Genus: Beilschmiedia
- Species: B. penangiana

Binomial name
- Beilschmiedia penangiana Gamble

Synonyms
- Beilschmiedia brevipes Ridl.; Beilschmiedia inconspicua Kosterm.

Species of tree

Beilschmiedia penangiana is a species of flowering plant in the family Lauraceae. It is a tree native to Peninsular Malaysia and southern Indochina (Cambodia, Thailand, and Vietnam). is threatened by habitat loss.

The species was described by James Sykes Gamble in 1910.
