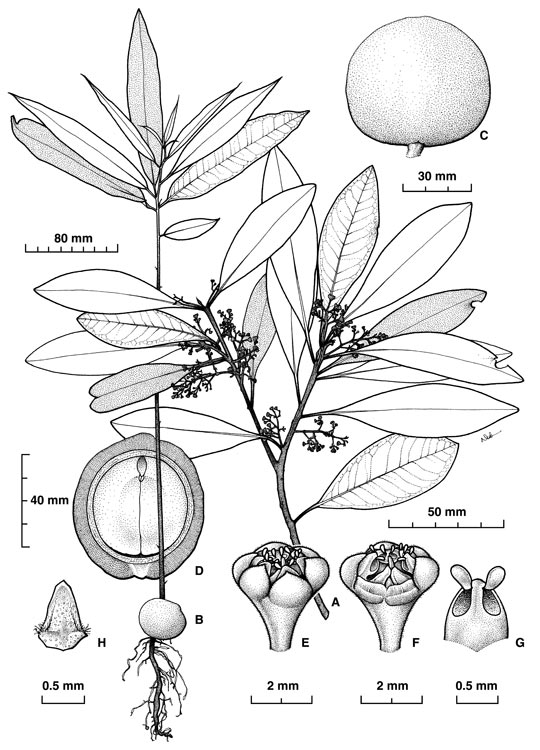
- Botanical sketch

Conservation status
- Near Threatened (NCA)

Scientific classification
- Kingdom: Plantae
- Clade: Tracheophytes
- Clade: Angiosperms
- Clade: Magnoliids
- Order: Laurales
- Family: Lauraceae
- Genus: Beilschmiedia
- Species: B. castrisinensis

Binomial name
- Beilschmiedia castrisinensis B.Hyland
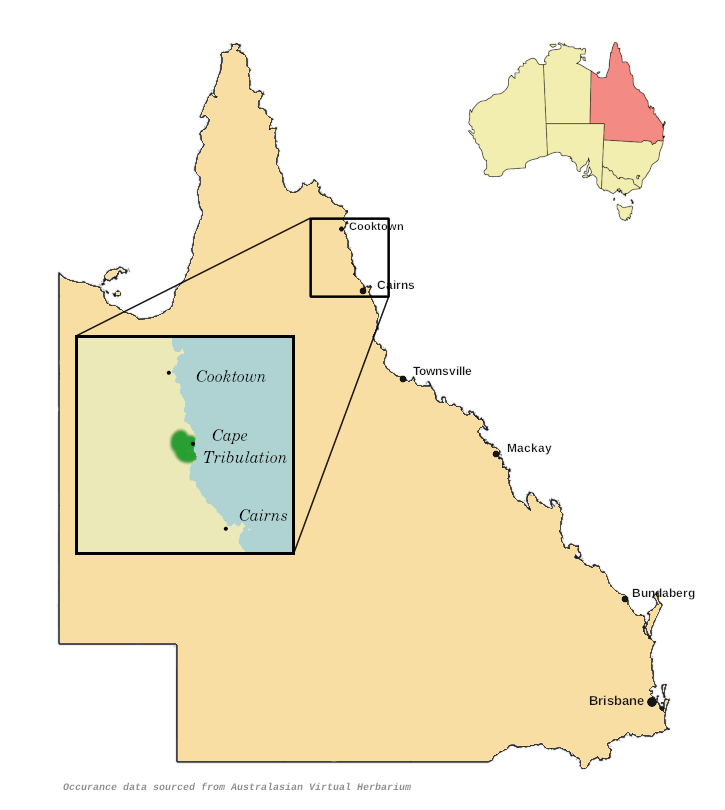

= Beilschmiedia castrisinensis =

Species of flowering plant

Beilschmiedia castrisinensis is a species of plant in the family Lauraceae native to the Wet Tropics bioregion of Queensland, Australia. It is a rainforest tree, first described in 1989, and it has a conservation status of near-threatened.

== Description ==
Beilschmiedia castrisinensis is a large tree that can reach 30 m (98 ft) in height and 80 cm (31 in) diameter. It is often buttressed, and the bark can be flaky or nondescript. The leaves are green above and glaucous (chalky blue-green) underneath. They average about 10 cm (3.9 in) long by 3 cm (1.2 in) wide, and they have between 11 and 19 lateral veins on either side of the midrib. The petiole, or leaf stalk, is about 13 mm (0.51 in) long.

The pale green or cream flowers are very small, with six tepals about 1 mm (0.04 in) long. They do not open widely, and only the tips of the six anthers and the stigma exposed. The fruit is a drupe about 6.5 cm (2.6 in) long, 7 cm (2.8 in) wide and flattened laterally. It is at first red and then black when ripe.

== Distribution ==
This species inhabits rainforest from sea level up to about 660 m (2,170 ft) altitude, and is restricted to the region from the Daintree River north to the Bloomfield River.

== Conservation ==
This species is listed as near-threatened under the Queensland Government's Nature Conservation Act. As of 27 August 2026, it has not been assessed by the International Union for Conservation of Nature.

== Gallery ==
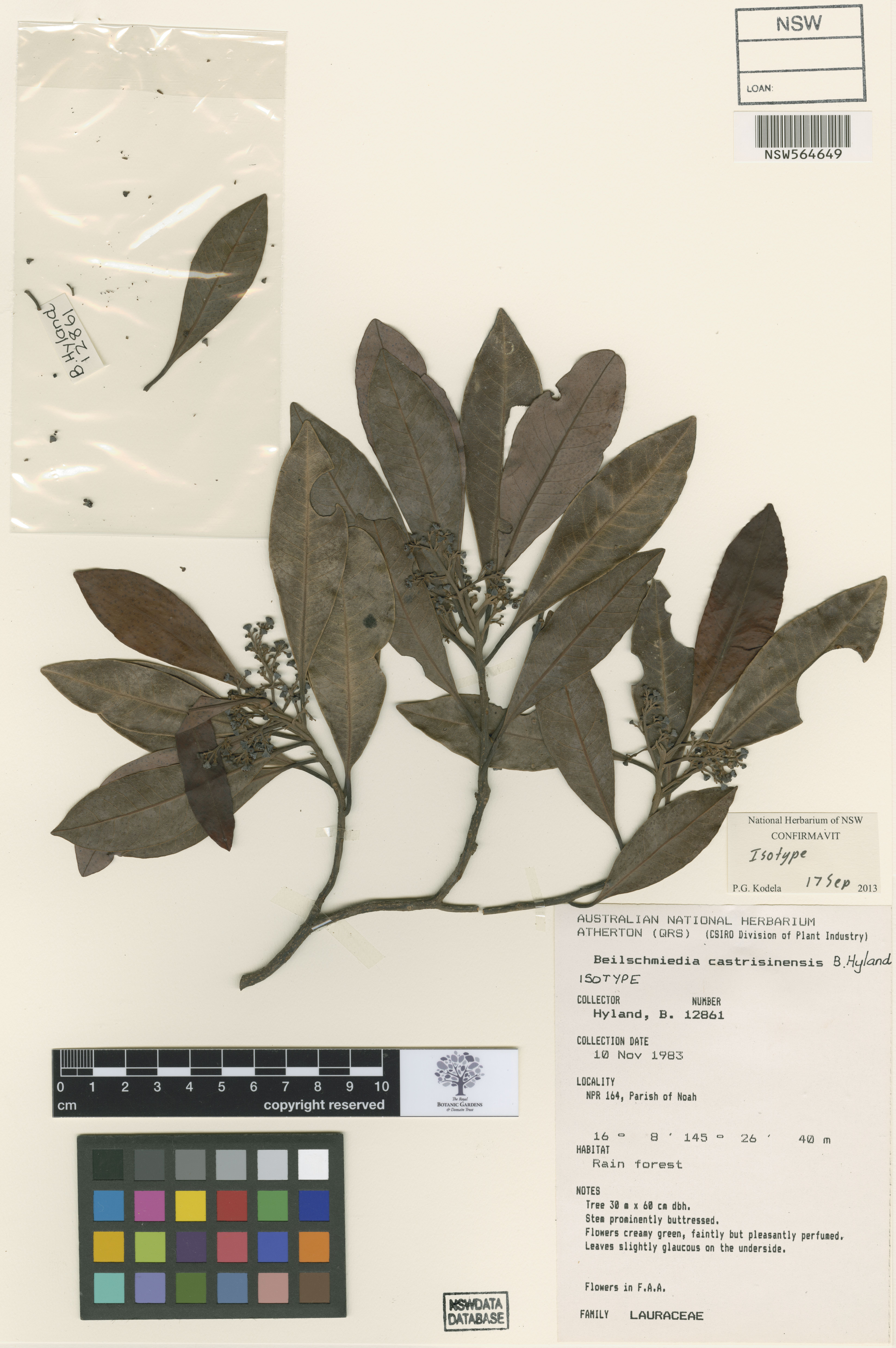
Herbarium specimen

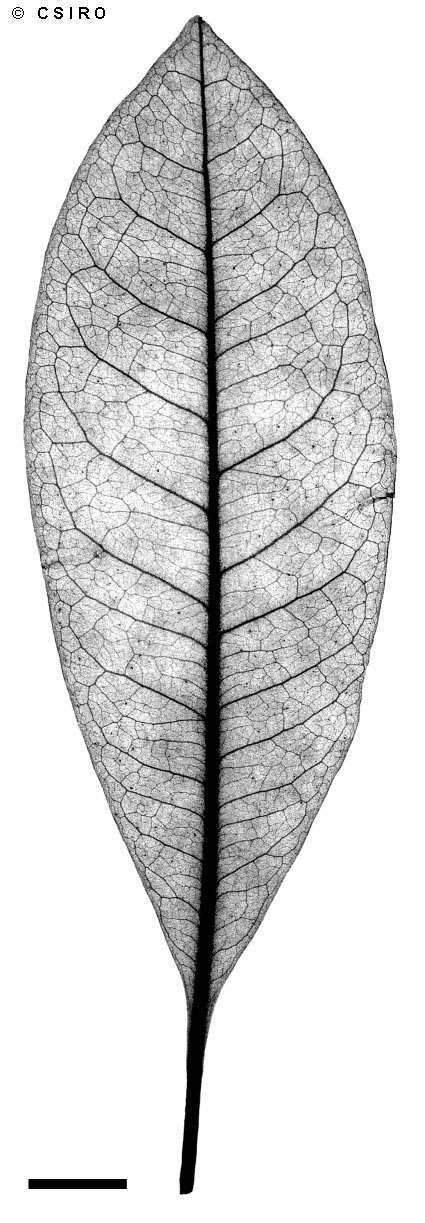
Xray of leaf

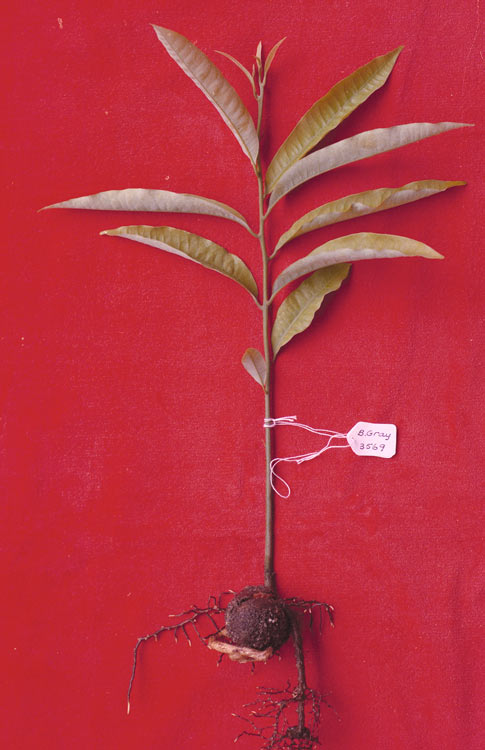
Seedling
