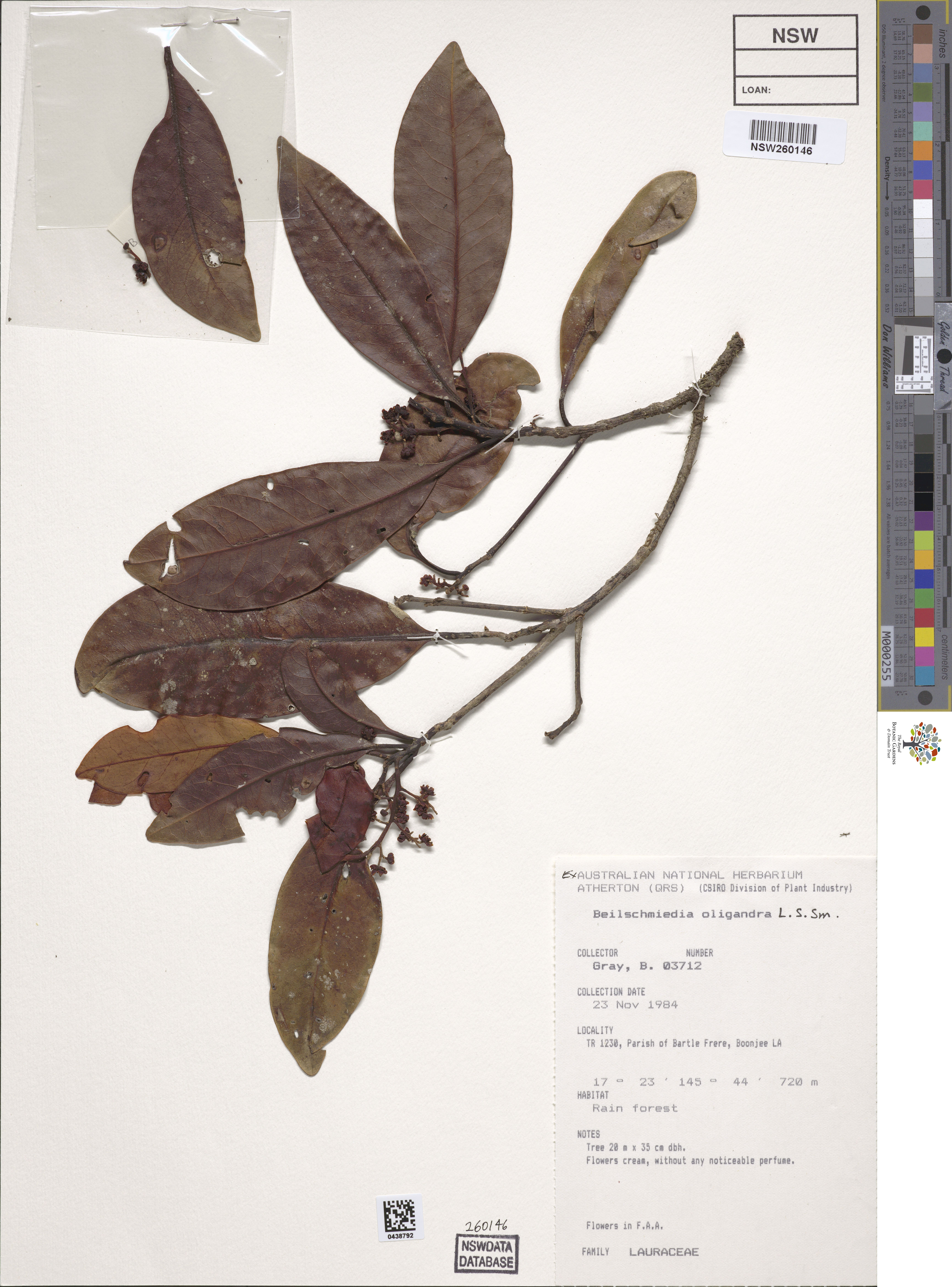
- Herbarium specimen

Conservation status
- Least Concern (IUCN 3.1)

Scientific classification
- Kingdom: Plantae
- Clade: Embryophytes
- Clade: Tracheophytes
- Clade: Angiosperms
- Clade: Magnoliids
- Order: Laurales
- Family: Lauraceae
- Genus: Beilschmiedia
- Species: B. oligandra

Binomial name
- Beilschmiedia oligandra L.S.Sm.

= Beilschmiedia oligandra =

Species of flowering plant

Beilschmiedia oligandra, commonly known as dogwood, is a species of plant in the family Lauraceae. It is a rainforest tree native to the Wet Tropics bioregion of Queensland, Australia, and first described in 1959. It has a conservation status of least-concern.

== Description ==
Beilschmiedia oligandra is a tree growing up to 30 m (98 ft) tall with a buttressed trunk. The leaves are elliptic to lanceolate, green above and glaucous below, and are up to 12 cm (4.7 in) long and 5 cm (2.0 in) wide.

Inflorescences are produced in the leaf axils and are shorter than the leaves. The flowers have six pale green to cream tepals about 2 mm (0.079 in) long. The fruit is an almost spherical drupe, dark red to black, and measuring about 6 cm (2.4 in) long and wide. It contains a single large seed.

== Distribution ==
Dogwood is endemic to a small part of the Wet Tropics bioregion of Queensland. It grows in rainforest on various soil types, from the Bloomfield River north of Cape Tribulation to the Johnstone River west of Innisfail. The altitudinal range is from 60 to 700 m (200 to 2,300 ft).

== Taxonomy ==
It was first described in 1959 by Australian botanist Lindsay Stuart Smith. The type specimen was collected by K.J. White in 1955 from Gadgarra in the eastern Atherton Tableland.

== Conservation ==
As of August 2026, this species has been assessed to be of least concern by the International Union for Conservation of Nature and by the Queensland Government under its Nature Conservation Act.
