= Beilschmiedia lucidula =

Conservation status
- Least Concern (IUCN 3.1)

Scientific classification
- Kingdom: Plantae
- Clade: Tracheophytes
- Clade: Angiosperms
- Clade: Magnoliids
- Order: Laurales
- Family: Lauraceae
- Genus: Beilschmiedia
- Species: B. lucidula

Binomial name
- Beilschmiedia lucidula (Miq.) Kosterm.

Synonyms
- List: Beilschmiedia gammieana King ex Hook.f.; Beilschmiedia globularia Kurz; Beilschmiedia lecomtei Kamik.; Beilschmiedia leytensis Merr.; Beilschmiedia nervosa (Elmer) Merr.; Beilschmiedia praecox Koord. & Valeton; Beilschmiedia sphaerocarpa Lecomte; Cryptocarya lucidula Miq.; Dictyodaphne sumatrana (Miq.) Meisn.; Endiandra sumatrana Miq.; Linociera nervosa Elmer

Species of plant

Beilschmiedia lucidula is a widespread species of flowering plant in the family Lauraceae, native to the eastern Indian Subcontinent, Indochina, and most of Malesia. It is a tree reaching 30 m (98 ft) tall.

It grows in primary and secondary evergreen lowland forests and montane forests from sea level to 2,150 metres elevation. It is often found growing on poor soils in seasonally wet areas. It is sometimes found growing in savannas or open vegetation, and on sandstone, granite, limestone, and poor sandy soils.
