= Beilschmiedia ambigua =

Conservation status
- Critically Endangered (IUCN 3.1)

Scientific classification
- Kingdom: Plantae
- Clade: Tracheophytes
- Clade: Angiosperms
- Clade: Magnoliids
- Order: Laurales
- Family: Lauraceae
- Genus: Beilschmiedia
- Species: B. ambigua

Binomial name
- Beilschmiedia ambigua Robyns & R. Wilczek

Species of flowering plant

Beilschmiedia ambigua is a species of plant in the family Lauraceae. It is endemic to the Democratic Republic of the Congo. It is threatened by habitat loss.

== Distribution ==
Beilschmiedia ambigua is found in the Marungu highlands, along the Pweto and Moba roads, and also along the western shores of Lake Tanganyika.

== Threats ==
One concern for the Beilschmiedia ambigua species is that its native habitat has become degraded by logging, and the stream banks have become eroded by cattle.
