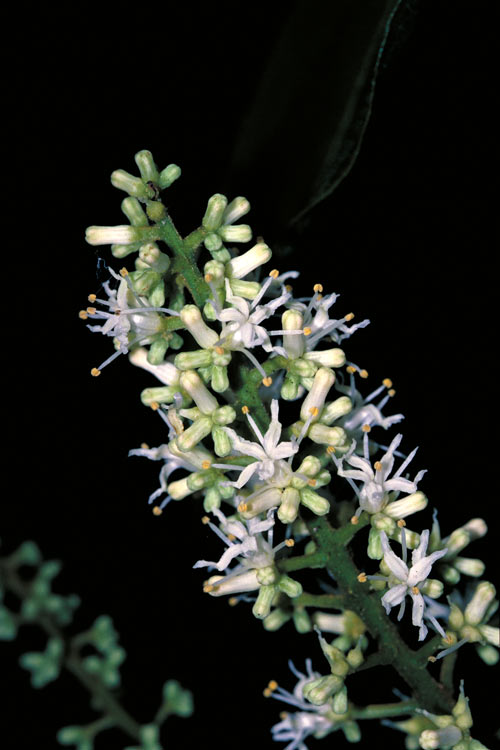
- Inflorescence

Conservation status
- Least Concern (IUCN 3.1)

Scientific classification
- Kingdom: Plantae
- Clade: Embryophytes
- Clade: Tracheophytes
- Clade: Spermatophytes
- Clade: Angiosperms
- Clade: Eudicots
- Clade: Asterids
- Order: Aquifoliales
- Family: Cardiopteridaceae
- Genus: Citronella
- Species: C. smythii

Binomial name
- Citronella smythii (F.Muell.) R.A.Howard

Synonyms
- Chariessa smythii (F.Muell.) Becc.; Villaresia smythii F.Muell.; Villaresia adenophylla Domin

= Citronella smythii =

Species of flowering plant

Citronella smythii, commonly known as northern silky beech, is a species of plant in the family Cardiopteridaceae. It is native to northeast Queensland, Australia, and has a conservation status of least concern.

== Description ==
This is a tree up to 25 m (82 ft) tall with a fluted trunk and corky fissured bark. The leaves can grow to 17 cm (6.7 in) long and 9 cm (3.5 in) wide, and they are ovate to elliptic in shape. Flowers are clustered on a raceme up to 10 cm (3.9 in) long, and they usually have five petals about 5 mm (0.2 in) long. The fruit is an ellipsoidal drupe up to 16 mm (0.63 in) long and 12 mm (0.47 in) wide, containing a single seed.

== Distribution and habitat ==
It is found in northeast Queensland from the Paluma Range National Park to Cape Tribulation. There is also a second population between about Coen and Lockhart River on Cape York Peninsula. It grows in rainforest at altitudes from sea level to about 1,200 m (3,900 ft).

== Conservation status ==
As of June 2026, this species has been assessed to be of least concern by the International Union for Conservation of Nature (IUCN) and by the Queensland Government under its Nature Conservation Act.
