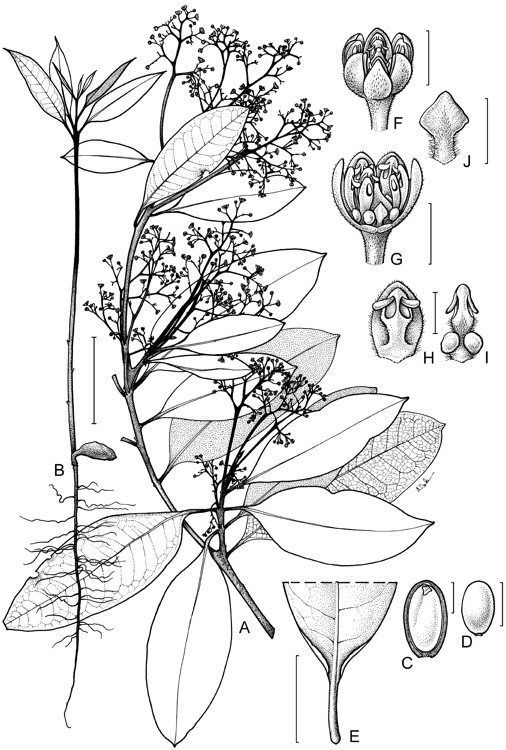
- Botanical illustration

Conservation status
- Least Concern (IUCN 3.1)

Scientific classification
- Kingdom: Plantae
- Clade: Embryophytes
- Clade: Tracheophytes
- Clade: Angiosperms
- Clade: Magnoliids
- Order: Laurales
- Family: Lauraceae
- Genus: Beilschmiedia
- Species: B. recurva

Binomial name
- Beilschmiedia recurva B.Hyland

= Beilschmiedia recurva =

Species of flowering plant

Beilschmiedia recurva, commonly known as khaki bark walnut or ivory walnut, is a species of plant in the family Lauraceae native to northeast Queensland, Australia. It was first described in 1989 and has a conservation status of least-concern. The fruit are eaten by various birds and mammals.

== Description ==
This is a tree growing up to 35 m (115 ft) tall and a trunk up to 90 cm (35 in) diameter. The bark is brown and larger trees are often buttressed. Leaves are shiny green on the upper surface and may be glaucous below; they are elliptical or oblong in shape with 7–12 pairs of lateral veins on either side of the midrib. They are generally about 10 cm (3.9 in) long and 4 cm (1.6 in) wide.

The flowers are cream to pale green in colour and quite small, with tepals about 1.5–2 mm (0.06–0.08 in) long. The fruits are ellipsoid in shape and black when ripe, and measure up to 3 cm (1.2 in) long and 2 cm (0.79 in) wide. The mesocarp and exocarp (flesh and skin, respectively) are both very thin and together are less than 1 mm (0.04 in) thick. Each fruit contains a single brown seed about 22 mm (0.9 in) long and 15 mm (0.6 in) wide.

== Distribution and habitat ==
Beilschmiedia recurva is widespread in northeast Queensland, from the ranges west of Cape Tribulation south to the Paluma Range National Park. It grows in rainforest on a variety of soil types, from 150 m (490 ft) above sea level to about 1,200 m (3,900 ft).

== Taxonomy ==
This species was described in 1989 by Australian botanist Bernard Hyland. It was published in his 232-page paper A Revision of Lauraceae in Australia (excluding Cassytha).

== Ecology ==
The fruits are eaten by native rats, musky rat-kangaroos, and various birds including tooth-billed bowerbirds and fruit doves.

== Uses ==
The tree produces a timber that is marketed under the name "ivory walnut", but it is of poor quality and rarely used. It has an average density of 665 kg/m^{3} (1,121 lb/cu yd) and an above-ground life expectancy of only seven years.

== Conservation ==
As of August 2026, this species has been assessed to be of least concern by the International Union for Conservation of Nature and by the Queensland Government in its Wildnet database.
