= Beilschmiedia pergamentacea =

Conservation status
- Least Concern (IUCN 3.1)

Scientific classification
- Kingdom: Plantae
- Clade: Tracheophytes
- Clade: Angiosperms
- Clade: Magnoliids
- Order: Laurales
- Family: Lauraceae
- Genus: Beilschmiedia
- Species: B. pergamentacea

Binomial name
- Beilschmiedia pergamentacea C.K.Allen

Synonyms
- Beilschmiedia atrata C.K.Allen

Species of plant

Beilschmiedia pergamentacea is a species of flowering plant in the family Lauraceae, native to southern China, Hainan, Vietnam, and Thailand. A tree reaching 20 m (66 ft), it is often found growing on dry sandy soil, on sandstone, or alongside streams, in hilly or mountainous areas.
