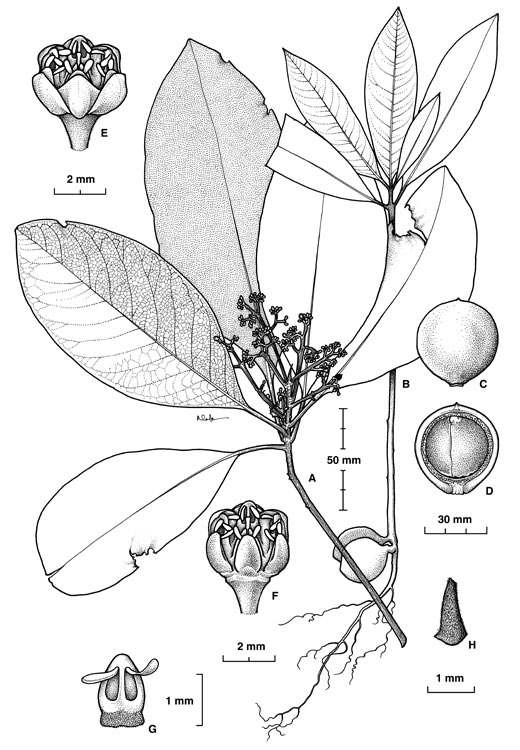
- Botanical sketch

Conservation status
- Least Concern (IUCN 3.1)

Scientific classification
- Kingdom: Plantae
- Clade: Embryophytes
- Clade: Tracheophytes
- Clade: Angiosperms
- Clade: Magnoliids
- Order: Laurales
- Family: Lauraceae
- Genus: Beilschmiedia
- Species: B. volckii

Binomial name
- Beilschmiedia volckii B.Hyland

= Beilschmiedia volckii =

Species of flowering plant

Beilschmiedia volckii, commonly known as Boonjee blush walnut, is a species of plant in the family Lauraceae. It is native to Queensland, Australia.

== Description ==
This is a tree growing up to 35 m (115 ft) tall, with a trunk up to 120 cm (47 in) diameter which is usually buttressed. It grows in rainforest on the eastern edge of the Atherton Tableland, usually on basalt soils, and at altitudes from 150 to 600 m (490 to 1,970 ft). The species epithet was chosen in honour of "Mr H.E. Volck, formerly Silvicultural Research Officer with the Queensland Department of Forestry, at Atherton".

== Conservation ==
As of August 2026, this species has been assessed to be of least concern by the International Union for Conservation of Nature and by the Queensland Government in its Wildnet database.
