= Beilschmiedia ugandensis =

Conservation status
- Least Concern (IUCN 3.1)

Scientific classification
- Kingdom: Plantae
- Clade: Tracheophytes
- Clade: Angiosperms
- Clade: Magnoliids
- Order: Laurales
- Family: Lauraceae
- Genus: Beilschmiedia
- Species: B. ugandensis

Binomial name
- Beilschmiedia ugandensis Rendle

Species of flowering plant

Beilschmiedia ugandensis is a species of plant in the family Lauraceae. It is found in the Democratic Republic of the Congo, Sudan, Tanzania, and Uganda. It is threatened by habitat loss. This species typically grows between 27 and 45 meters tall and with a trunk 30 and 100 centimeters in diameter.
