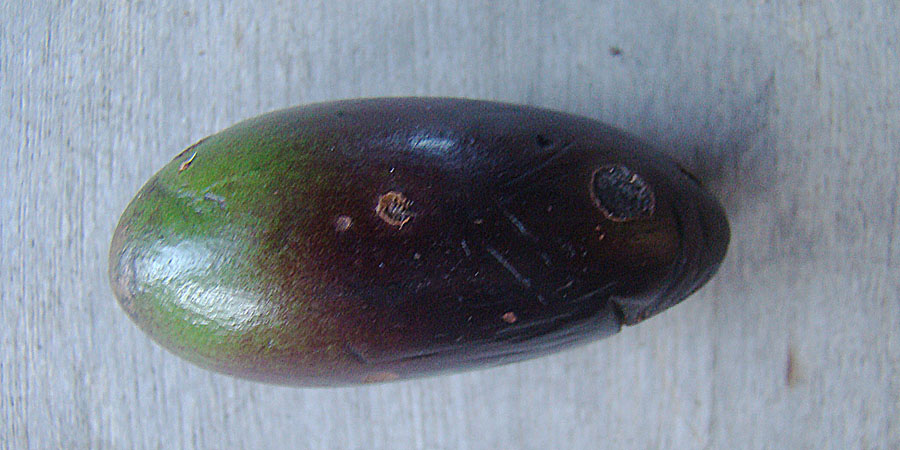
- Beilschmiedia pendula fruit

Conservation status
- Least Concern (IUCN 3.1)

Scientific classification
- Kingdom: Plantae
- Clade: Tracheophytes
- Clade: Angiosperms
- Clade: Magnoliids
- Order: Laurales
- Family: Lauraceae
- Genus: Beilschmiedia
- Species: B. pendula

Binomial name
- Beilschmiedia pendula (Sw.) Hemsl. (1882)

Synonyms
- Beilschmiedia brenesii C.K.Allen (1945); Beilschmiedia thomaea (Nees) Benth. & Hook.f. ex B.D.Jacks. (1893); Cryptocarya kostermansiana C.K.Allen (1945); Hufelandia pendula (Sw.) Nees (1833); Hufelandia thomaea Nees (1833); Laurus pendula Sw. (1788); Wimmeria thomaea Nees ex Meisn. (1864), not validly publ.

= Beilschmiedia pendula =

Species of flowering plant

Beilschmiedia pendula is a species of tree in the laurel family (Lauraceae). It is native to Central America (Honduras to Panama), northwestern South America (Ecuador, Colombia, and Venezuela), and the West Indies (Cuba, Jamaica, Hispaniola, Puerto Rico, Leeward Islands, and Windward Islands).
