= Beilschmiedia micrantha =

Conservation status
- Least Concern (IUCN 3.1)

Scientific classification
- Kingdom: Plantae
- Clade: Tracheophytes
- Clade: Angiosperms
- Clade: Magnoliids
- Order: Laurales
- Family: Lauraceae
- Genus: Beilschmiedia
- Species: B. micrantha

Binomial name
- Beilschmiedia micrantha Merr., 1929

Synonyms
- Beilschmiedia micrantha var. latifolia Merr.

Species of flowering plant

Beilschmiedia micrantha is a species of tree in the laurel family (Lauraceae). It is endemic to Borneo. It is a large tree which grows up to 40 metres tall. It flowers from April to July, and September and October, and fruits in July and October.

It is known from eastern Sabah (Malaysia) and East and South Kalimantan (Indonesia). It grows in primary or secondary lowland rain forest, up to 300 metres elevation. It often grows near rivers on sandy loam, limestone, or brown to blackish soils.

No subspecies are listed in the Catalogue of Life.
