= Beilschmiedia preussii =

Conservation status
- Endangered (IUCN 3.1)

Scientific classification
- Kingdom: Plantae
- Clade: Tracheophytes
- Clade: Angiosperms
- Clade: Magnoliids
- Order: Laurales
- Family: Lauraceae
- Genus: Beilschmiedia
- Species: B. preussii

Binomial name
- Beilschmiedia preussii Engl.

Synonyms
- Afrodaphne preussii (Engl.) Stapf; Tylostemon preussii (Engl.) Stapf

Species of flowering plant

Beilschmiedia preussii is a species of flowering plant in the family Lauraceae. It is a tree or shrub endemic to southwestern Cameroon. It is native to several scattered locations in the lowland evergreen rain forests. It is threatened by habitat loss.

== Description ==
Beilschmiedia preussii is a shrub characterized by its smooth green branchlets. The leaves are lanceolate and long-acuminate, with the acumen reaching up to 10 lines in length. They are acute at the base, measuring up to 10 inches in length and nearly 3 inches in width, and have a thin texture. Each leaf has 7 to 8 lateral nerves on either side, ascending in direction. The petiole is terete, deeply channeled, and approximately 5 lines long.

The panicles are about the same length as the leaves, with a very short rusty pubescence and a lax structure composed of long, slender branches. The pedicels are either equal to or slightly longer than the flowers. The perianth is three-quarters of a line in diameter, wide-turbinate in shape, and hairy both internally and externally. Its segments are ovate and measure less than half a line in length, with long hairs at the base of the filaments.

The extrorse stamens are accompanied by a suborbicular two-lobed gland on each side of their base. The staminodes are reduced to ovate glands. The ovary is covered with long hairs and transitions into a short conoid style.
