= Beilschmiedia vermoesenii =

Conservation status
- Critically Endangered (IUCN 3.1)

Scientific classification
- Kingdom: Plantae
- Clade: Tracheophytes
- Clade: Angiosperms
- Clade: Magnoliids
- Order: Laurales
- Family: Lauraceae
- Genus: Beilschmiedia
- Species: B. vermoesenii

Binomial name
- Beilschmiedia vermoesenii Robyns & R.Wilczek

Species of flowering plant

Beilschmiedia vermoesenii is a species of flowering plant in the family Lauraceae. It is a shrub or tree endemic to the northwestern Democratic Republic of the Congo. It is threatened by habitat loss.
