= Beilschmiedia robertsonii =

Conservation status
- Data Deficient (IUCN 3.1)

Scientific classification
- Kingdom: Plantae
- Clade: Tracheophytes
- Clade: Angiosperms
- Clade: Magnoliids
- Order: Laurales
- Family: Lauraceae
- Genus: Beilschmiedia
- Species: B. robertsonii

Binomial name
- Beilschmiedia robertsonii Gamble

Species of tree

Beilschmiedia robertsonii is an Asian tree species in the family Lauraceae. It is native to Assam, Bangladesh, Myanmar, Thailand, and Vietnam. In Vietnam it may be called săng gia. No subspecies are listed in the Catalogue of Life.
