= Beilschmiedia gaboonensis =

Conservation status
- Least Concern (IUCN 3.1)

Scientific classification
- Kingdom: Plantae
- Clade: Tracheophytes
- Clade: Angiosperms
- Clade: Magnoliids
- Order: Laurales
- Family: Lauraceae
- Genus: Beilschmiedia
- Species: B. gaboonensis

Binomial name
- Beilschmiedia gaboonensis (Meisn.) Benth. & Hook.f.

Synonyms
- Afrodaphne gaboonensis (Meisn.) Stapf; Afrodaphne obscura Stapf; Beilschmiedia conferta (S.Moore) Robyns & R.Wilczek; Beilschmiedia obscura (Stapf) A.Chev.; Oreodaphne gaboonensis Meisn.; Tylostemon confertus S.Moore; Tylostemon gaboonensis (Meisn.) Stapf; Tylostemon obscurus (Stapf) Stapf

Species of evergreen tree

Beilschmiedia gaboonensis is an evergreen tree in the subgenus Hufelandia of the genus Beilschmiedia, in the family Lauraceae. It is native to central Africa. It is a medium-sized tree which can measure up to 30 m tall with a bole diameter of up to 60 cm. It is distributed from southern Nigeria to the Congo Basin, occurring in Cameroon, Gabon and Zaïre. It is associated with marshy locations in lowland rainforest. Similarly to Beilschmiedia mannii, it is known under the trade names "kanda" and "pink kanda". The bark is used in analgesic and healing ointments.

== Description ==
The trees grow up to 30 metres or more in height with trunks up to 1.2 metres in diameter. It is often the dominant canopy species in lowland forests. The branches are stout, and tend to spread widely. The leaves are dark green, and measure 7–12 cm in length and 3-5 centimetres in width. It produces small inconspicuous bisexual flowers (diameter: 2 mm), which are pubescent, with ovate tepals clustered in axillary or subterminal panicles (length: 6 cm). The inflorescence and perianth are sparsely pubescent. The fruit is obovoid, subglobose, ellipsoid to fusiform, and mucronate, and measures about 35–60 mm long. It is scarlet or purplish brown when ripe.
