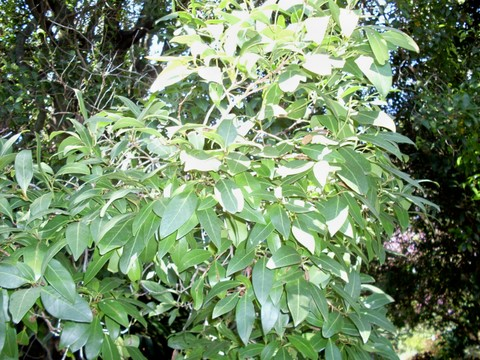
- Foliage

Conservation status
- Least Concern (IUCN 3.1)

Scientific classification
- Kingdom: Plantae
- Clade: Tracheophytes
- Clade: Angiosperms
- Clade: Magnoliids
- Order: Laurales
- Family: Lauraceae
- Genus: Beilschmiedia
- Species: B. elliptica

Binomial name
- Beilschmiedia elliptica C.T.White & W.D.Francis

= Beilschmiedia elliptica =

Species of tree

Beilschmiedia elliptica, known as the grey walnut is a rainforest laurel native to northeastern New South Wales and southeastern Queensland in eastern Australia. The range of natural distribution is from Forster, New South Wales (32° S) to Fraser Island (25° S) in southeastern Queensland. Beilschmiedia elliptica grows in warm temperate and subtropical rainforests. It is not a rare species, but seldom identified in the rainforest.

== Description ==
A medium to large tree reaching to 30 metres tall and 90 cm in trunk diameter. The cylindrical trunk is reddish brown or grey, with raised dots and depressions in the bark. The tree's base is somewhat buttressed or flanged.

The shoots and stems are hairy. The elliptic shaped leaves are alternate and not toothed, 8 to 10 cm long and 2 to 3 cm wide. Leaf venation is prominent on both sides, with a raised midrib and prominent intramarginal vein.

Cream flowers form in panicles from August to October. The fruit is a black round drupe with a glaucous bloom, 12 mm long with a single seed inside. The fruit is ripe from February to April. As with most Australian laurels, removal of the fleshy aril is advised to assist seed germination, which is slow but fairly reliable with Beilschmiedia elliptica.

The fruit is eaten by a variety of birds, including rose-crowned fruit dove, topknot pigeon and white-headed pigeon.
