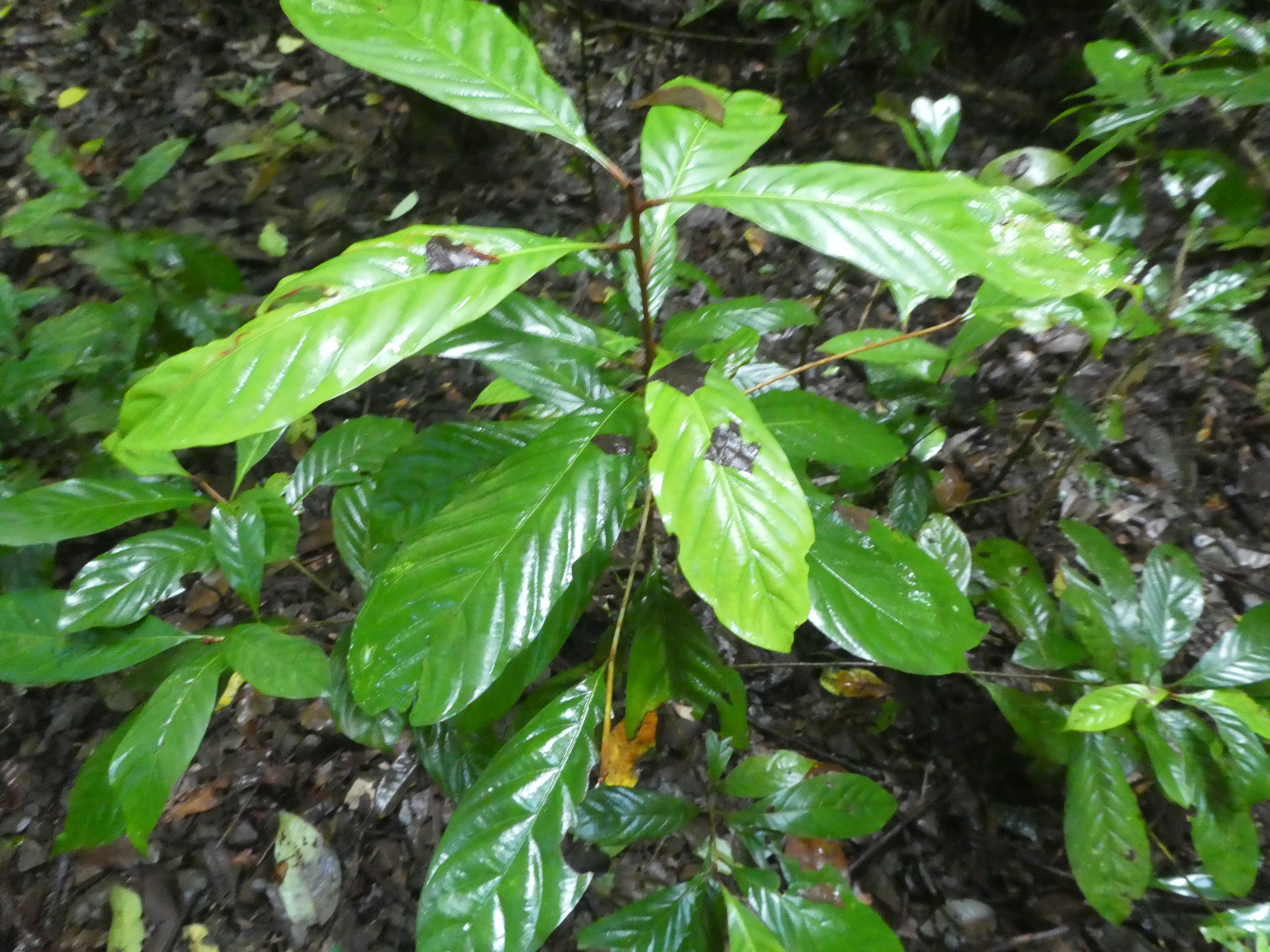
- In Wooroonooran National Park

Conservation status
- Least Concern (IUCN 3.1)

Scientific classification
- Kingdom: Plantae
- Clade: Tracheophytes
- Clade: Angiosperms
- Clade: Magnoliids
- Order: Laurales
- Family: Lauraceae
- Genus: Beilschmiedia
- Species: B. tooram

Binomial name
- Beilschmiedia tooram (F.M.Bailey) B.Hyland

Synonyms
- Endiandra tooram F.M.Bailey

= Beilschmiedia tooram =

Species of flowering plant

Beilschmiedia tooram, commonly known as coach walnut, brown walnut or Tooram's walnut, is a tree in the family Lauraceae found only in the Wet Tropics bioregion of Queensland, Australia. It was first described by Frederick Manson Bailey as Endiandra tooram in 1901, and transferred to the genus Beilschmiedia in an extensive review of Australian Lauraceae by Bernard Hyland in 1989.

== Conservation ==
As of October 2024, this species has been assessed to be of least concern by the International Union for Conservation of Nature (IUCN) and by the Queensland Government under its Nature Conservation Act.
