= Beilschmiedia bancroftii =

Conservation status
- Least Concern (IUCN 3.1)

Scientific classification
- Kingdom: Plantae
- Clade: Tracheophytes
- Clade: Angiosperms
- Clade: Magnoliids
- Order: Laurales
- Family: Lauraceae
- Genus: Beilschmiedia
- Species: B. bancroftii

Binomial name
- Beilschmiedia bancroftii (F.M.Bailey) C.T.White

Synonyms
- Cryptocarya bancroftii F.M.Bailey

Species of flowering plant

Beilschmiedia bancroftii is a tree species in the family Lauraceae. It is native to Queensland in Australia. Common names include yellow walnut, yellow nut and canary ash.

The species was first formally described by Queensland colonial botanist Frederick Manson Bailey in 1891, based on plant material collected on the Johnstone River and "other scrubs of tropical Queensland". It was initially named Cryptocarya bancroftii, but later transferred to the genus Beilschmiedia in 1918 by Cyril Tenison White.

Though the seeds are toxic when fresh, they were used by indigenous Australians following treatment.
