= Beilschmiedia membranacea =

Conservation status
- Endangered (IUCN 3.1)

Scientific classification
- Kingdom: Plantae
- Clade: Tracheophytes
- Clade: Angiosperms
- Clade: Magnoliids
- Order: Laurales
- Family: Lauraceae
- Genus: Beilschmiedia
- Species: B. membranacea

Binomial name
- Beilschmiedia membranacea Gamble

Species of tree

Beilschmiedia membranacea is a species of plant in the family Lauraceae. It is a tree endemic to Peninsular Malaysia and is believed to be in Taman Negara. The IUCN Red List assesses the species as Endangered.
