= Beilschmiedia laotica =

Conservation status
- Vulnerable (IUCN 3.1)

Scientific classification
- Kingdom: Plantae
- Clade: Tracheophytes
- Clade: Angiosperms
- Clade: Magnoliids
- Order: Laurales
- Family: Lauraceae
- Genus: Beilschmiedia
- Species: B. laotica

Binomial name
- Beilschmiedia laotica Kosterm. ex de Kok

Species of tree

Beilschmiedia laotica is an Asian tree species in the family Lauraceae. It is a tree native to Laos and Vietnam. In Vietnam it may be called két Lào; no subspecies are listed in the Catalogue of Life. It grows in lowland tropical moist forest up to 750 metres elevation.
