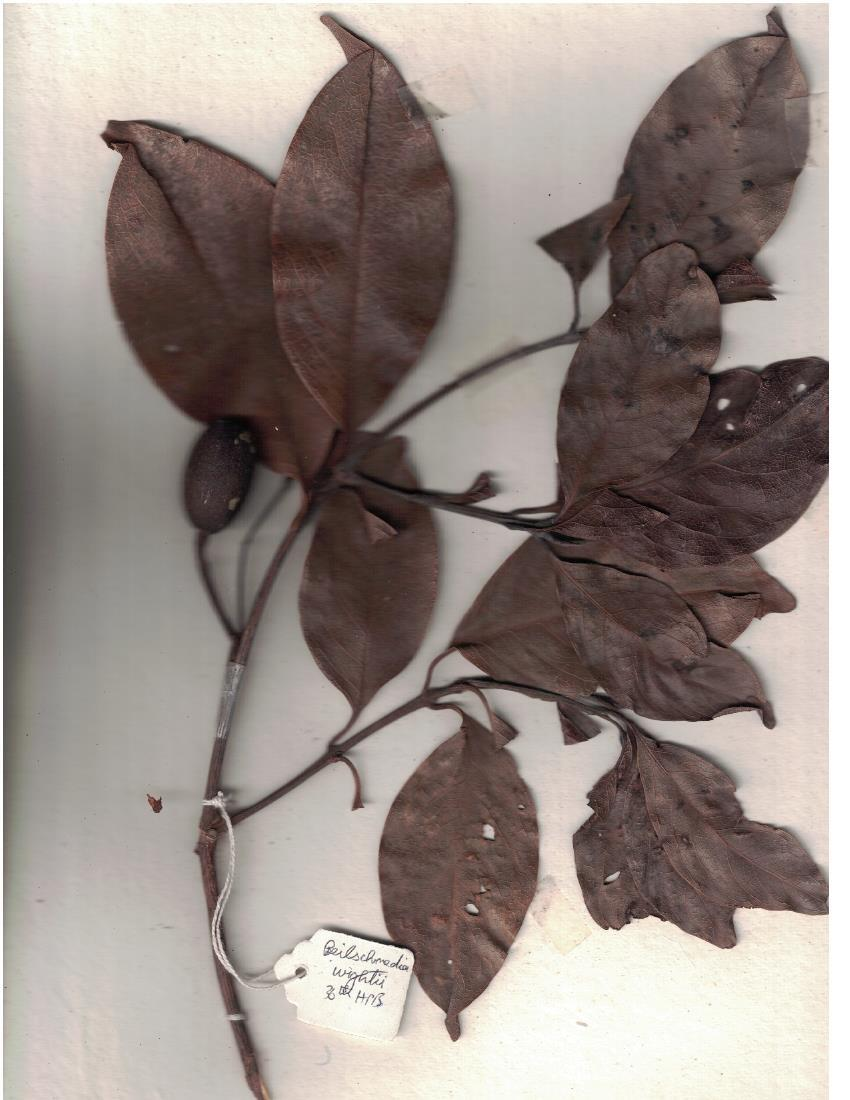

Conservation status
- Near Threatened (IUCN 3.1)

Scientific classification
- Kingdom: Plantae
- Clade: Tracheophytes
- Clade: Angiosperms
- Clade: Magnoliids
- Order: Laurales
- Family: Lauraceae
- Genus: Beilschmiedia
- Species: B. wightii

Binomial name
- Beilschmiedia wightii (Nees) Benth. ex Hook.f.)

Synonyms
- Dehaasia wightii Nees; Apollonias zeylanica Thwaites; Beilschmiedia oppositifolia Benth. ex Hook.f.; Beilschmiedia zeylanica (Thwaites) Trimen; Dehaasia oppositifolia Meisn.

= Beilschmiedia wightii =

Species of plant

Beilschmiedia wightii is a species of flowering plant in the family Lauraceae. It is native to South India and Sri Lanka. In southern India it is native to montane evergreen moist forests from 1,200 to 2,500 metres elevation.
