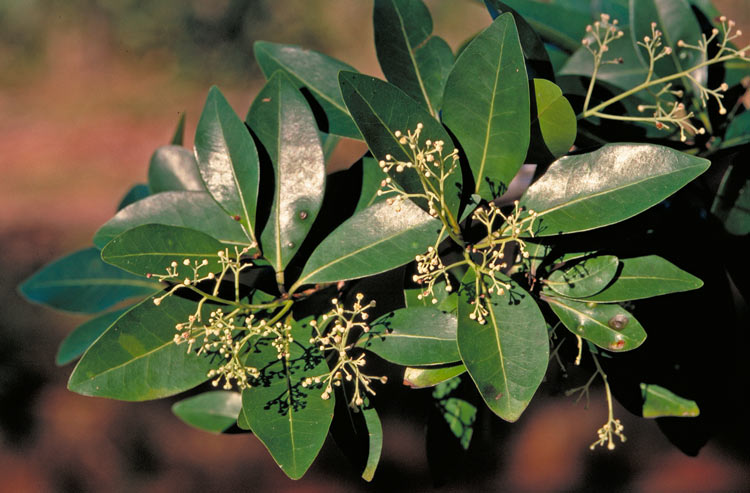
- Foliage and flowers

Conservation status
- Least Concern (IUCN 3.1)

Scientific classification
- Kingdom: Plantae
- Clade: Embryophytes
- Clade: Tracheophytes
- Clade: Angiosperms
- Clade: Magnoliids
- Order: Laurales
- Family: Lauraceae
- Genus: Beilschmiedia
- Species: B. peninsularis

Binomial name
- Beilschmiedia peninsularis B.Hyland

= Beilschmiedia peninsularis =

Species of flowering plant

Beilschmiedia peninsularis, commonly known as Hann walnut, is a species of plant in the family Lauraceae. It is native to Queensland, Australia.

== Description ==
This is a tree growing up to 20 m (66 ft) tall, with an unbuttressed trunk up to 70 cm (28 in) diameter. It grows in rainforested areas of Cape York Peninsula, usually on granite soils, from sea level up to about 600 m (2,000 ft). The species epithet was chosen to reflect the area to which it is native.

== Conservation ==
As of August 2026, this species has been assessed to be of least concern by the International Union for Conservation of Nature and by the Queensland Government in its Wildnet database.
