= Beilschmiedia mayumbensis =

Conservation status
- Endangered (IUCN 3.1)

Scientific classification
- Kingdom: Plantae
- Clade: Tracheophytes
- Clade: Angiosperms
- Clade: Magnoliids
- Order: Laurales
- Family: Lauraceae
- Genus: Beilschmiedia
- Species: B. mayumbensis

Binomial name
- Beilschmiedia mayumbensis Robyns & R.Wilczek (1950)

Species of flowering plant

Beilschmiedia mayumbensis is a species of plant in the family Lauraceae. It is endemic to the Democratic Republic of the Congo. It is threatened by habitat loss.

Beilschmiedia mayumbensis is a small tree which grows up to 8 meters high.

The species is known from only three collections, made between 1948 and 1958. The locations are widely scattered, and the species' estimated extent of occurrence (EOO) is to be 425,098 km^{2} while its estimated area of occupancy (AOO) is just 12 km^{2}.

It grows in lowland tropical rainforest including primary forest, old forest relics, and forest with Macrolobium, from 200 to 920 meters elevation.

The species' forest is being cleared for shifting agriculture, logging, and charcoal production. One of the three known locations is in the Rubi-Tele Hunting Reserve, while the others are unprotected.
