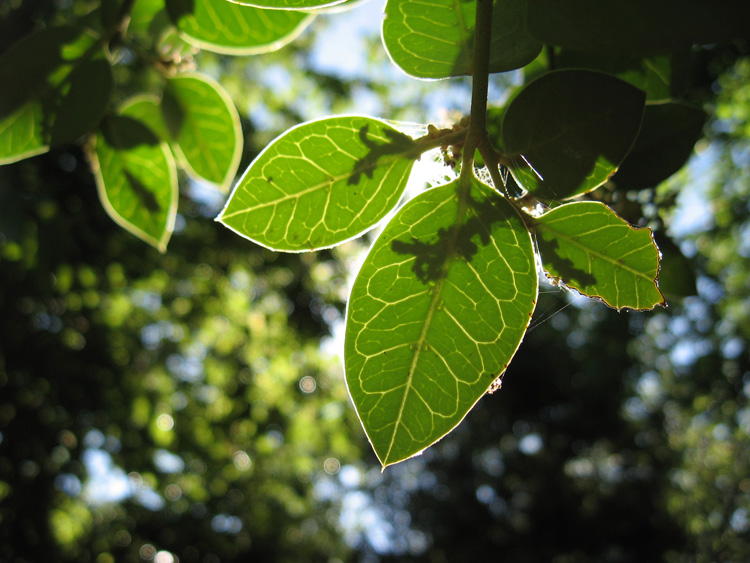
- Citronella mucronata

Scientific classification
- Kingdom: Plantae
- Clade: Tracheophytes
- Clade: Angiosperms
- Clade: Eudicots
- Clade: Asterids
- Order: Aquifoliales
- Family: Cardiopteridaceae
- Genus: Citronella; D.Don

Synonyms
- Chariessa Miq.; Briquetina J.F.Macbr.

= Citronella (genus) =

Genus of flowering plants

Citronella is a genus of trees and shrubs in the family Cardiopteridaceae described as a genus in 1832. It is native to tropical regions of South and Central America, insular Southeast Asia, Australia, and islands of the western Pacific. The genus was formerly treated as belonging to the family Icacinaceae.

Few species have been cultivated. Citronella mucronata, from Chile, is remarkable for its hardiness compared to other members of this genus. It is one of the most well-known of the species and has been introduced to Europe.

== Species ==
- Citronella apogon - Bolivia, NW Argentina
- Citronella costarricensis - Costa Rica, Panama, Colombia, Venezuela, Peru
- Citronella engleriana - Rio de Janeiro
- Citronella gongonha - Brazil, Paraguay, Uruguay, NE Argentina
- Citronella hirsuta - New Caledonia
- Citronella incarum - Peru, Colombia, Ecuador
- Citronella latifolia - Samar
- Citronella lucidula - Solomon Islands
- Citronella macrocarpa - New Caledonia
- Citronella melliodora - Peru, Colombia, Ecuador, Bolivia
- Citronella moorei - New South Wales & Queensland
- Citronella mucronata - Chile
- Citronella paniculata - Brazil, Paraguay, Venezuela, Misiones
- Citronella philippinensis - Luzon
- Citronella samoensis - Solomon Islands, Samoa, Tonga
- Citronella sarmentosa - New Caledonia
- Citronella silvatica - Colombia
- Citronella smythii - Queensland
- Citronella suaveolens - Indonesia, New Guinea
- Citronella vitiensis - Fiji
