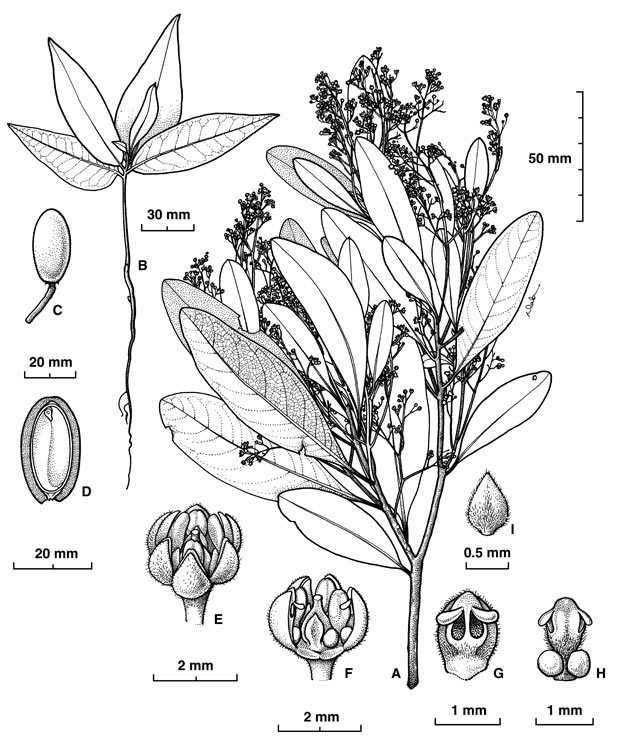

Conservation status
- Least Concern (IUCN 3.1)

Scientific classification
- Kingdom: Plantae
- Clade: Tracheophytes
- Clade: Angiosperms
- Clade: Magnoliids
- Order: Laurales
- Family: Lauraceae
- Genus: Beilschmiedia
- Species: B. collina

Binomial name
- Beilschmiedia collina B.Hyland

= Beilschmiedia collina =

Species of flowering plant

Beilschmiedia collina, commonly known as blush walnut, is a species of plant in the family Lauraceae, first described in 1989. It is native to northeast and central east Queensland, Australia.

== Description ==
This is a tree that may reach 30 m (98 ft) in height and 60 cm (24 in) diameter at breast height, with a nondescript bark and usually without buttresses. The leaves are lanceolate to narrowly obovate, dull chalky-green underneath, and average about 10 cm (3.9 in) long and 3 cm (1.2 in) wide. They are arranged alternately on the twigs and attached to them with petioles averaging about 12 mm (0.47 in) long. There are between six and ten pairs of lateral veins on either side of the midrib.

Inflorescences emerge from the leaf axils and carry many very small pale green flowers with tepals that are about 1.5 mm (0.06 in) long and 1 mm (0.04 in) wide. Flowers of the genus Beilschmiedia typically are bisexual and have six tepals in two whorls of three, nine stamens, and 2- or 4-locular anthers. The ovary is sessile and the stigma is insignificant.

The fruit is, in botanical terms, a berry, black or dark purple in colour, ellipsoid, and containing a single seed. It may reach 23 mm (0.9 in) long and 13 mm (0.5 in) diameter, the seed about 19 mm (0.7 in) long and 12 mm (0.5 in) diameter.

== Distribution and habitat ==
Beilschmiedia collina is endemic to Queensland, Australia, occurring along the east coast, mostly on sub-coastal ranges from about Rossville to Eungella National Park near Mackay. It grows in rainforest on granitic soils at altitudes from 350 m (1,150 ft) to about 1,200 m (3,900 ft).

== Taxonomy ==
This species was first described in 1989 by Bernard Hyland, based on the examination of over 80 collected specimens. He published the name is a far-reaching review of Lauraceae in Australia.

=== Etymology ===
The species epithet collina is a reference to the tree's preference for mountain forest. It is derived from the Latin word collis, meaning 'hill'.

== Conservation status ==
This species has been assessed to be of least concern by the International Union for Conservation of Nature, and by the Queensland Government under its Nature Conservation Act.

== Uses ==
The fruit is eaten by a number of species of fruit doves.

The tree grows large enough to produce useful-sized logs, but the timber is not of high quality. What is milled is marketed as Blush Walnut, and it has a specific gravity of 0.9.
