= Los Bellotos del Melado National Reserve =

- IUCN category IV (habitat/species management area)
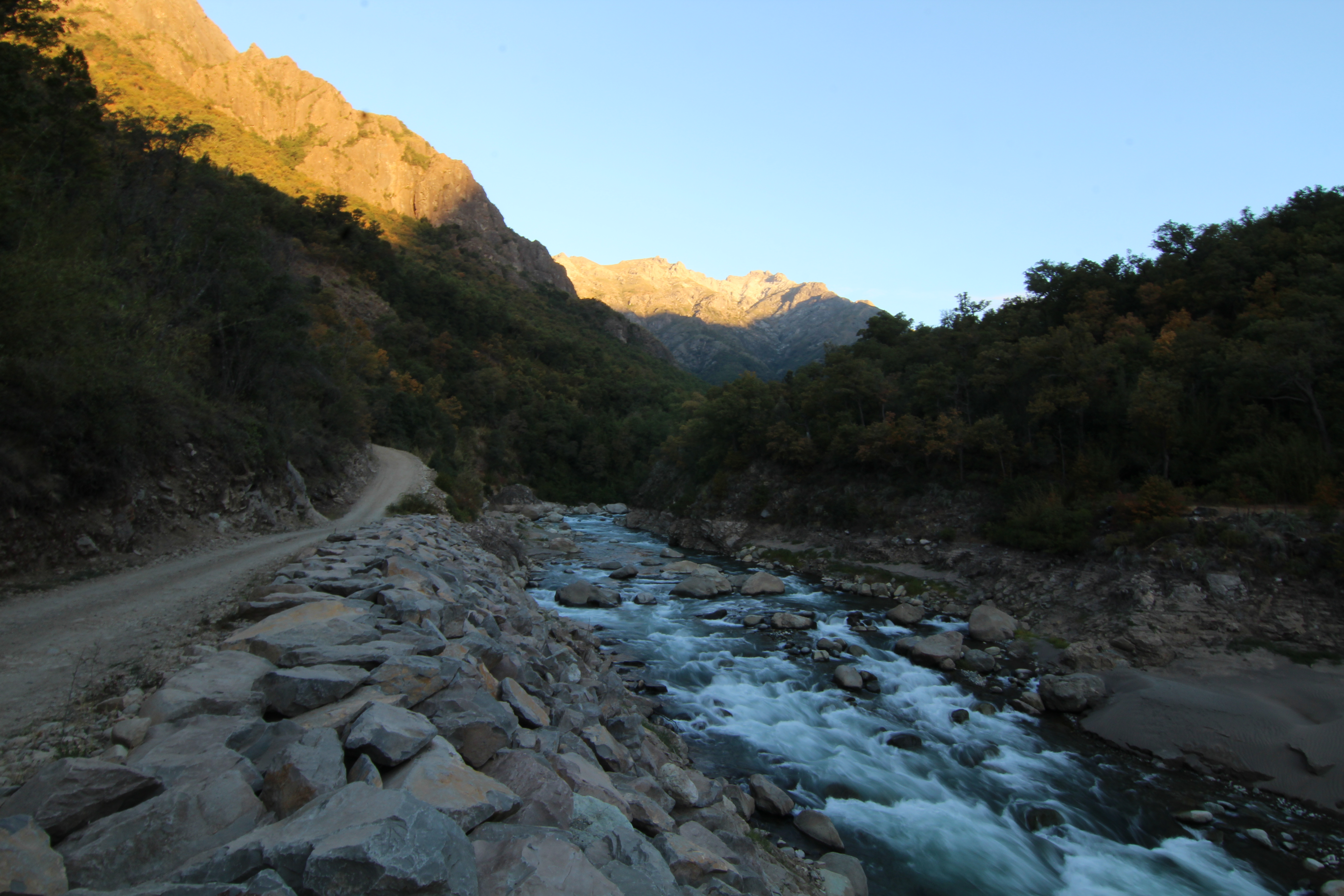
- Interactive map of Los Bellotos del Melado National Reserve
- Location: Maule Region, Chile
- Coordinates: 35.858°S 71.105°W
- Area: 4.17 km^{2} (1.61 sq mi)
- Designation: National Reserve
- Designated: 1996
- Governing body: Corporación Nacional Forestal (CONAF)

Los Bellotos del Melado National Reserve is a national reserve in Maule Region of central Chile.
