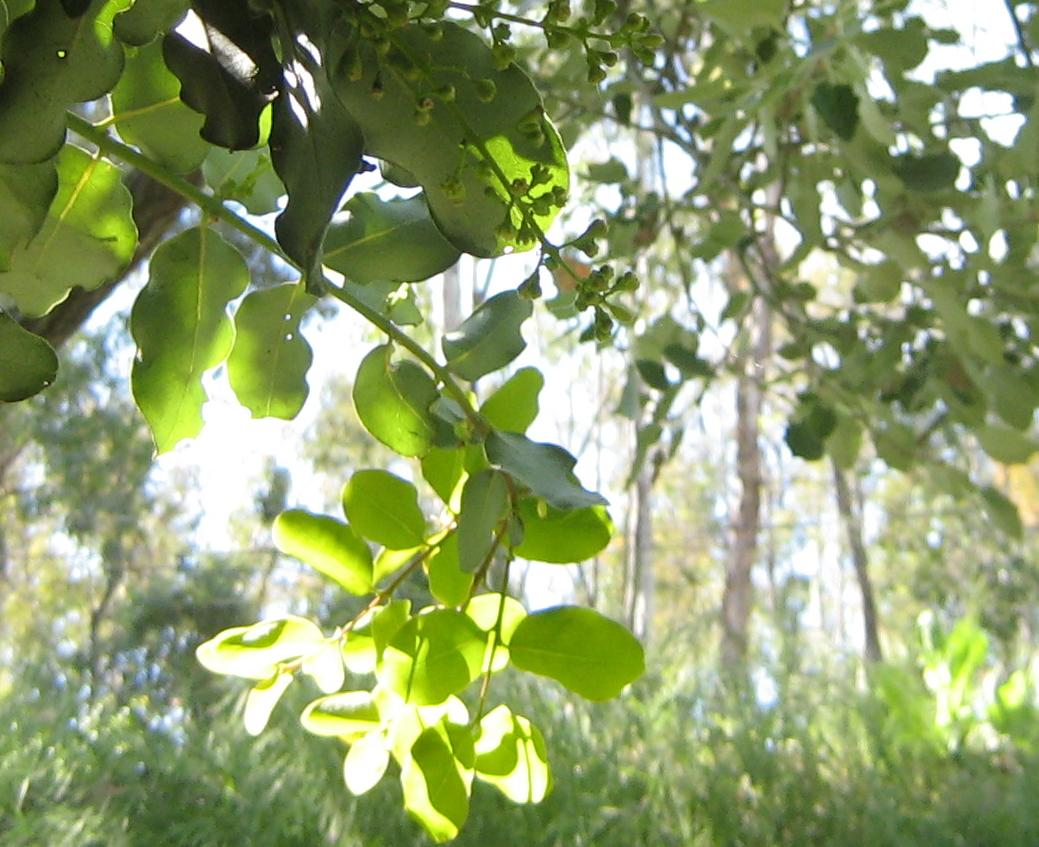

Conservation status
- Vulnerable (IUCN 3.1)

Scientific classification
- Kingdom: Plantae
- Clade: Tracheophytes
- Clade: Angiosperms
- Clade: Magnoliids
- Order: Laurales
- Family: Lauraceae
- Genus: Beilschmiedia
- Species: B. miersii

Binomial name
- Beilschmiedia miersii (Gay) Kosterm.

Synonyms
- Bellota miersii Gay

= Beilschmiedia miersii =

Species of tree

Beilschmiedia miersii, commonly known as the northern acorn tree, is a species of evergreen tree in the family Lauraceae. It is native to central Chile from 30 to 35°S., up to 1200 meters (4000 ft) above sea level and lives under very dry conditions.

A type locality for B. miersii is the La Campana National Park and Cerro La Campana, where it is associated with the endangered Chilean wine palm.

== Description ==
Reaches 25 meters (82 ft) height and 80 cm (31 in) diameter. Straight and cylindrical trunk. Gray-brownish bark. Leaves are simple, opposite and subopposite, aovate to aovate-elliptical, entire margin, wavy, above they are dark and glossy, below they are glaucous, obtuse to emarginate apex, obtuse to slightly subcordate base, the leaves are about 4–11 cm long and 1,5–5 cm wide, petioles very pubescent about 5–10 mm long. Flowers are hermaphrodite, in inflorescences about 3–10 cm; pedicellate about 2–5 mm, yellow greenish, pubescent and fleshy tepals, the style ends in a papillose and obtuse stigma.

== Cultivation and uses ==
In central Chile this species is used as an ornamental. Its fruit is a brown drupe when ripe and is sometimes used for feeding pigs. It has also been planted and acclimatized in Spain.
