= Koombooloomba National Park =

National park in Australia

- Interactive map of Koombooloomba National Park
- Location: Tablelands Region, Queensland, Australia
- Coordinates: 17.892°S 145.599°E
- Area: 29,258 ha (112.97 sq mi)
- World Heritage site: Wet Tropics of Queensland

Koombooloomba National Park is a protected area mostly within the Tablelands Region, Queensland, Australia. The park is within the Wet Tropics World Heritage Area and is known for its endangered wet schlerophyll forests and for unique animals and plants. It has an area of 29,258 hectares (72,300 acres).
