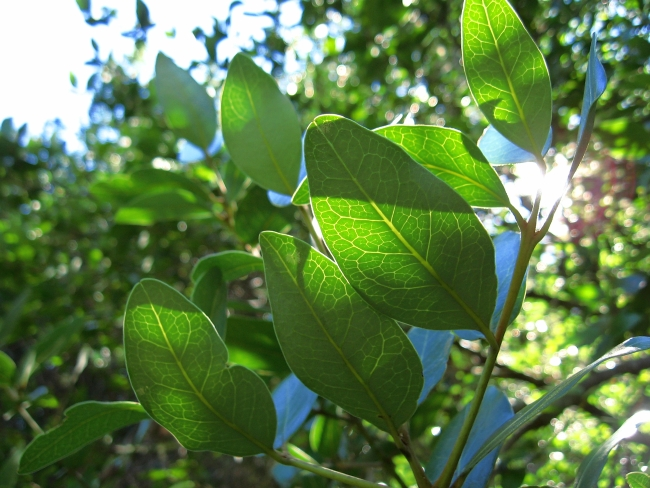

Conservation status
- Endangered (IUCN 3.1)

Scientific classification
- Kingdom: Plantae
- Clade: Tracheophytes
- Clade: Angiosperms
- Clade: Magnoliids
- Order: Laurales
- Family: Lauraceae
- Genus: Beilschmiedia
- Species: B. berteroana

Binomial name
- Beilschmiedia berteroana (Gay) Kosterm.

Synonyms
- Adenostemum nitidum Bertero; Bellota nitida Phil.; Bellota pauciflora Phil.; Boldu nitidum (Phil.) Meisn.; Cryptocarya berteroana Gay; Cryptocarya nitida (Phil.) Phil.

= Beilschmiedia berteroana =

Species of tree

Beilschmiedia berteroana (southern acorn tree, belloto del sur in Spanish) is a threatened evergreen tree in the family Lauraceae endemic to Chile at 35 to 37°S.

== Description ==
It can measure 30 m in height and one metre in diameter. The trunk is straight and branched, and the bark is gray with longitudinal fissures. Leaves are opposite and subopposite, elliptical to aovate-elliptical, and they have entire margins; they are glossy green above and glaucous below. The apex is rounded or slightly emarginated and the base is lightly wedge-shaped. The leaves are about 3–7.5 cm long and 2–4 cm wide, with pubescent petioles 2–5 mm long. The hermaphrodite flowers are arranged in inflorescences about 5–6 cm long. The pedicellate flowers are 4–6 mm and greenish-yellow in color. The edible fruit is a green, globose drupe with a single seed, 1.5–2 cm in diameter, with a point at the apex.

== Ecology ==
It grows at altitudes up to 1800 m above sea level, and it has an acceptable frost tolerance within this mostly tropical genus. A specific example of occurrence is in the La Campana National Park of central Chile and amid the adjoining Cerro La Campana; in that location it is associated with the endangered Chilean wine palm, a tree with a much wider prehistoric distribution than at present.

== Uses and cultivation ==
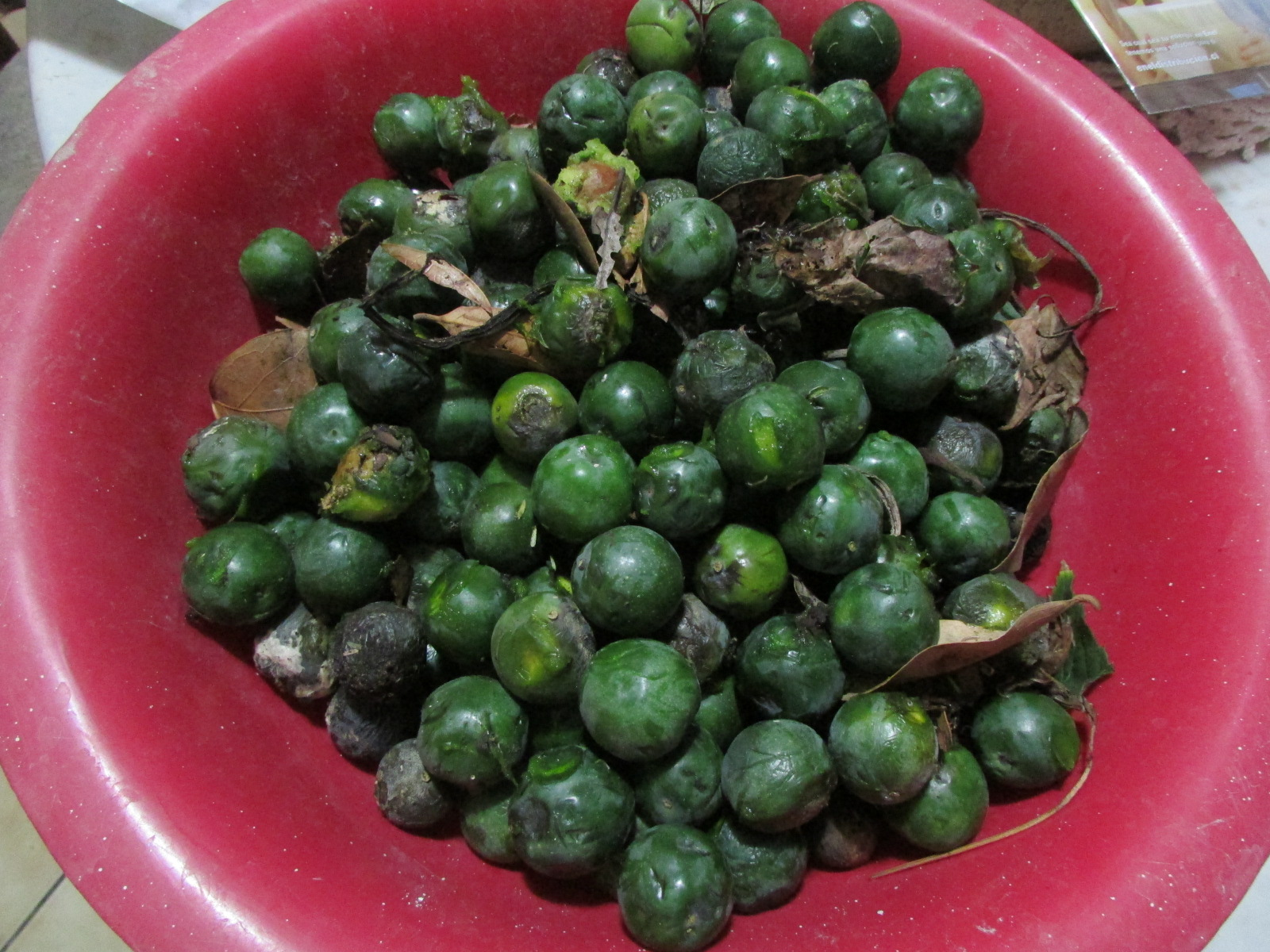

Edible fruit, with a sweet taste; of local consumption, with fruit potential. The bark of B. berteroana is useful for tanning leather. It is often used as an ornamental tree in Chile. It blooms between July and August (Southern Hemisphere). The flowers are used by introduced European bees for producing a very delicious honey. The wood is very beautiful and hard. Can grow up to USDA zone 9b. The tree has been planted and acclimatized in Spain, but is rarely seen there.

== See also ==
- Gomortega keule
- Avellanita bustillosii
- Cryptocarya alba
- Peumus boldus
