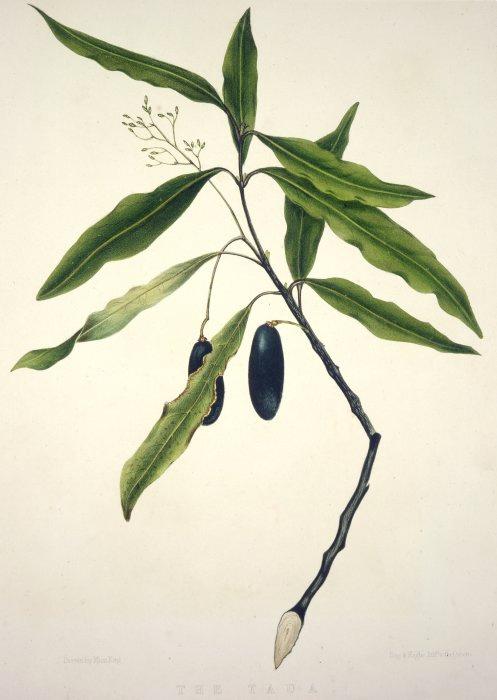
- Beilschmiedia tawa

Scientific classification
- Kingdom: Plantae
- Clade: Embryophytes
- Clade: Tracheophytes
- Clade: Spermatophytes
- Clade: Angiosperms
- Clade: Magnoliids
- Order: Laurales
- Family: Lauraceae
- Genus: Beilschmiedia; Nees

Type species
- Beilschmiedia roxburghiana Nees

Species
- 267 species - see text

Synonyms
- Afrodaphne Stapf; Anaueria Kosterm.; Bellota Gay; Bernieria Baill.; Boldu Nees; Hufelandia Nees; Lauromerrillia C.K.Allen; Nesodaphne Hook.f.; Purkayasthaea Purkay.; Thouvenotia Danguy; Tylostemon Engl.; Wimmeria Nees

= Beilschmiedia =

Genus of trees and shrubs

Beilschmiedia is a genus of trees and shrubs in family Lauraceae. Most of its species grow in tropical climates, but a few of them are native to temperate regions, and they are widespread in tropical Asia, Africa, Madagascar, Australia, New Zealand, North America, Central America, the Caribbean, and South America. The best-known species to gardeners in temperate areas are B. berteroana and B. miersii because of their frost tolerance. Seeds of B. bancroftii were used as a source of food by Australian Aborigines. Timbers of some species are very valuable.

== Ecology ==
Beilschmiedia falls within the Lauraceae, a family of aromatic evergreen trees or shrubs. Many botanical species are similar in foliage to the Lauraceae due to convergent evolution. Those plants are adapted to high rainfall and humidity. The patterns of speciation in the Lauraceae indicate, since the onset of aridification on the continents 15 million years ago (Mya), rainforest species diversified. One of the products of aridification is the isolation of populations and this likely caused the increase in the rate of speciation as found in the Lauraceae. This genus has species adapted to the laurel forest habitat, so common in the Lauraceae and species adapted to a more Mediterranean-type climate with a dry season with lower rainfall. The morphology of sclerophyllous species is divergent from other humid tropical climate species of the genus. The greatest diversity of species and a greater presence of the genus is given in cloud forest and tropical rainforest in Asia and Southeast Asia. In Madagascar, the genus Beilschmiedia is particularly important in the island flora, and their species were isolated when the island was separated from the African continent.

The genus Beilschmiedia is present in a greater climatic distribution area than other genera of Lauraceae, Beilschmiedia species grow well in moist, well-drained ground, and tolerate a variety of soil types, and attain a maximum in tropical and wetter areas of distribution, but their pattern of speciation results in some cases from the product of aridification of the habitat. Some Beilschmiedia species are adapted to drier conditions than the typical Lauraceae. Some endangered relict species are living in temperate areas and are distributed in Mediterranean climate, and tropical and subtropical lowland forests and montane rainforest.

Shade-loving B. mannii grows in riverine and swamp forest, or in evergreen primary and secondary forest. B. gaboonensis, B. lebrunii, and B. nitida are included in subgenus Hufelandia of Beilschmiedia. B. variabilis and B. zenkeri are included in section Acrothecon.

Beilschmiedia gaboonensis is a medium-sized tree up to 30 m tall with a bole diameter up to 60 cm. It is distributed from Nigeria to DR Congo and occurs in wet and marshy locations in lowland rainforest. B. lebrunii is a rare tree up to 15 m tall with a bole diameter up to 30 cm, occurring in DR Congo in forest at 1450–1700 m elevation. B. nitida is a shrub or small tree up to 8 m tall, distributed in Cameroon and Congo.

Beilschmiedia variabilis is a shrub or small tree up to 10 m tall with a bole diameter up to 25 cm, occurring rather commonly in Congo in the understorey of forest in swampy, periodically inundated or drier locations. B. zenkeri is a shrub or small tree up to 15 m tall, occurring in Cameroon and Congo in swampy and periodically inundated forest.

The genus Beilschmiedia responded to favourable climatic periods and expanded across the available habitat, adapting also to more extreme conditions, but depending on favorable soil edaphic conditions. Beilschmiedia species need an annual oscillation of the temperature moderated by the proximity of the ocean and many species resist bad cold and frost.

A related vegetal community evolved millions of years ago on the supercontinent of Gondwana, and species of this community are now found on several separate areas of the Southern Hemisphere, including South America, Africa, New Zealand, Australia, and New Caledonia. Lauroid-leaved plant communities are found from humid montane tropical to cool temperate Southern Hemisphere climates, and important elements of what is known as the Antarctic flora.

The genus Beilschmiedia is present in Mexico, Venezuela, and southern Chile and Argentina from the Pacific Ocean to the Andes between 38° and 45° S latitude, where rainfall is abundant, from 1500 to 2500 mm according to locality and distributed throughout the year, but with some subhumid Mediterranean climate influence for three to four months in summer, and where temperatures are mild, with no month falling below 5 °C, and the warmest month below 22 °C.

Laurophyll trees appear in the highlands of New Guinea and New Britain, Cape York Peninsula and the coastal mountains of Queensland and New South Wales in Australia, as well as New Caledonia, Tasmania, and New Zealand. These laurel forests are home to plants of the Antarctic flora related to those in the Valdivian laurel forests of southern Chile, including species of the laurel family and southern beech (Nothofagus). Australia, New Guinea, New Zealand, and New Caledonia were parts of the ancient supercontinent Gondwana, and have drifted north over millions of years with the Indo-Australian tectonic plate.

== Description ==
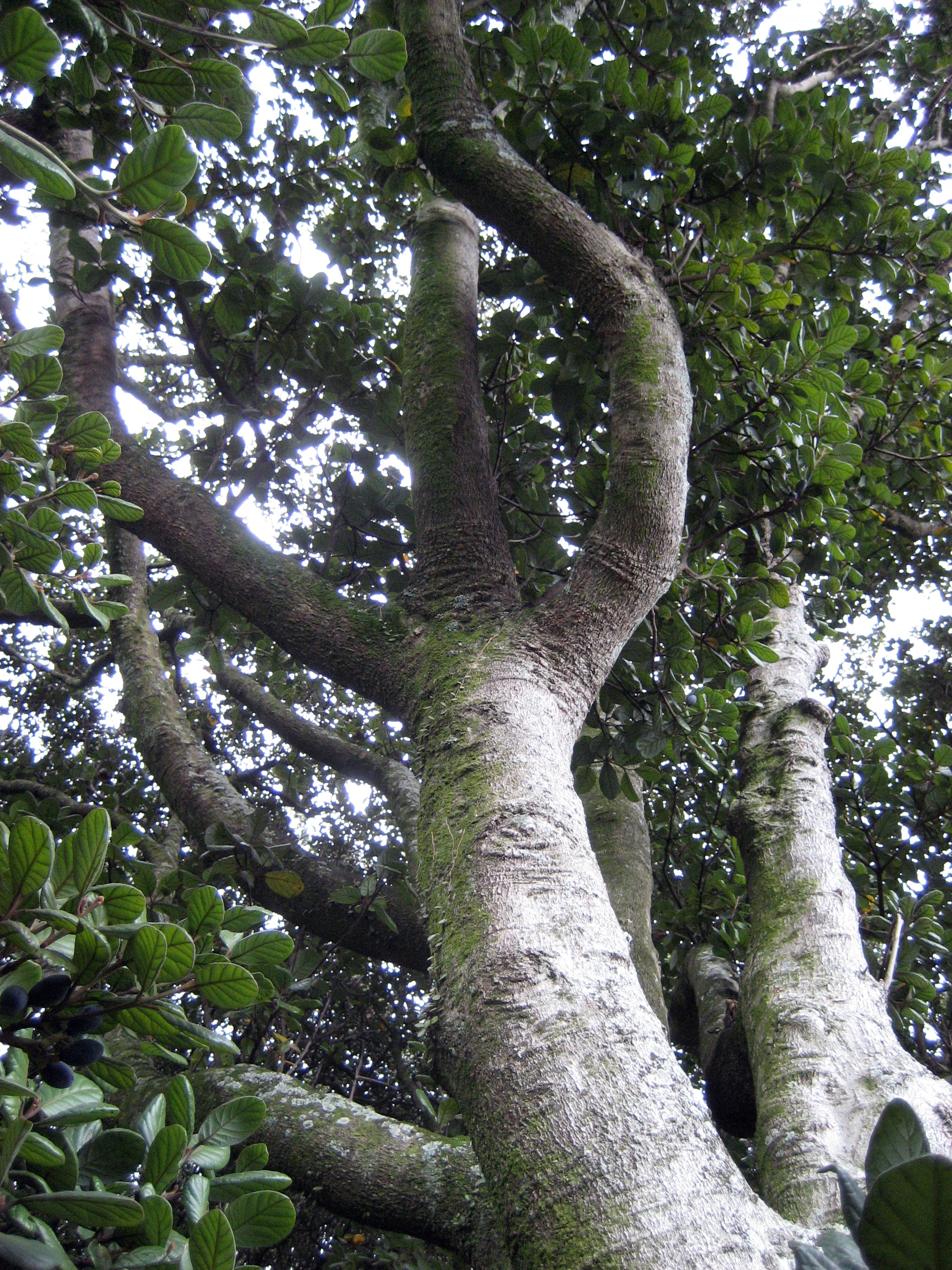
Beilschmiedia tarairi

Frequently, their bark is pale to dark brown, smooth or coarse, and they have fine, reddish-brown hairs densely covering the branchlets, and the young leaves are reddish. The dark green leaves are alternate and leathery. Sometimes broad, others small and narrow, the leaves have distinctive depressed veins. The flowers are greenish to cream to yellow-green, and pedicellate of 4–6 mm. The flowers often are clothed in dense reddish-brown hairs. The flowers are hermaphroditic and arranged in inflorescences. The inflorescence is an erect panicle arising from the leaf axil. The stamens are in two whorls; the ovary is in a superior position.

The fruit is variable from one species to other' in some species it is a drupe, large and globose green, 12 cm in diameter with a tip at the apex. In other species, the fruit is an erect, plum-like, dark purple or sometimes elliptical to ovoid drupe, dark purple when ripe, and covered in a waxy bloom. In others, the fruit is a black, round drupe with a glaucous bloom, with a single seed inside. Seed dispersal for many Beilschmiedia species is by birds that swallow them, so they are shaped to attract the birds. The one-seeded fruits are an important food source for birds, including being a favorite food of the native pigeons in New Zealand.

== Species ==
The type species is Beilschmiedia roxburghiana, which ranges from the Himalayas to southern China, Indo-China and Peninsular Malaysia. Three Beilschmiedia species are endemic to New Zealand. taraire (Beilschmiedia tarairi) is a common canopy tree in the lowland forests of the North Island. The others are the common canopy tree tawa, (B. tawa), which has thin, willow-like leaves, and the tawaroa (B. tawaroa), which is similar to tawa but has broader leaves. The New Zealand pigeon is the only species which can disperse the large seeds of the taraire, which pass through its gut unharmed.

Beilschmiedia miersii and Beilschmiedia berteroana are endangered sclerophyllous trees endemic to central Chile. The northern belloto (B. miersii) grows in coastal forest, while the southern belloto (B. berteroana) grows in submontane Andean zone of the central Chile's temperate deciduous forest region. Both forest associations are currently represented in the Chilean government's system of wild protected areas.

=== Accepted species ===
The following 267 species are accepted by Plants of the World Online as of June 2026:

- Beilschmiedia aborensis Kosterm.
- Beilschmiedia acuta Kosterm.
- Beilschmiedia acutifolia Teschner
- Beilschmiedia alata Robyns & R.Wilczek
- Beilschmiedia alloiophylla (Rusby) Kosterm.
- Beilschmiedia ambigua Robyns & R.Wilczek
- Beilschmiedia anacardioides (Engl. & K.Krause) Robyns & R.Wilczek
- Beilschmiedia anay (S.F.Blake) Kosterm.
- Beilschmiedia andamanensis M.Gangop.
- Beilschmiedia angustielliptica Lorea-Hern.
- Beilschmiedia angustifolia Kosterm.
- Beilschmiedia appendiculata (C.K.Allen) S.K.Lee & Y.T.Wei
- Beilschmiedia assamica Meisn.
- Beilschmiedia atra Kosterm. ex de Kok
- Beilschmiedia auriculata Robyns & R.Wilczek
- Beilschmiedia balansae Lecomte
- Beilschmiedia bancroftii (F.M.Bailey) C.T.White
- Beilschmiedia bangkae Kosterm.
- Beilschmiedia baotingensis S.K.Lee & Y.T.Wei
- Beilschmiedia barensis (Engl. & K.Krause) Robyns & R.Wilczek
- Beilschmiedia batangensis (Engl.) Robyns & R.Wilczek
- Beilschmiedia berteroana (Gay) Kosterm.
- Beilschmiedia bhutanica M.Gangop.
- Beilschmiedia bidoupensis Komada, Tagane & Yahara
- Beilschmiedia bolavenensis Tagane & Soulad.
- Beilschmiedia brachystachys Kosterm.
- Beilschmiedia brachythyrsa H.W.Li
- Beilschmiedia bracteata Robyns & R.Wilczek
- Beilschmiedia brandisii Hook.f.
- Beilschmiedia brasiliensis (Kosterm.) Kosterm.
- Beilschmiedia brevifolia Y.T.Wei
- Beilschmiedia brevipaniculata C.K.Allen
- Beilschmiedia brunnea B.Hyland
- Beilschmiedia calcitranthera Fouilloy
- Beilschmiedia castrisinensis B.Hyland
- Beilschmiedia caudata (Stapf) A.Chev.
- Beilschmiedia chevalieri Robyns & R.Wilczek
- Beilschmiedia cinnamomea (Stapf) Robyns & R.Wilczek
- Beilschmiedia clarkei Hook.f.
- Beilschmiedia collina B.Hyland
- Beilschmiedia congestiflora (Engl. & K.Krause) Robyns & R.Wilczek
- Beilschmiedia congolana Robyns & R.Wilczek
- Beilschmiedia corbisieri (Robyns) Robyns & R.Wilczek
- Beilschmiedia costaricensis (Mez & Pittier) C.K.Allen
- Beilschmiedia crassa Sach.Nishida
- Beilschmiedia crassifolia (Engl.) Robyns & R.Wilczek
- Beilschmiedia crassipes (Engl. & K.Krause) Robyns & R.Wilczek
- Beilschmiedia cryptocaryoides Kosterm.
- Beilschmiedia curviramea (Meisn.) Kosterm.
- Beilschmiedia cuspidata (K.Krause) Robyns & R.Wilczek
- Beilschmiedia cylindrica S.K.Lee & Y.T.Wei
- Beilschmiedia dalzellii (Meisn.) Kosterm.
- Beilschmiedia danhkyi B.H.Quang, V.H.Nguyen & Tagane
- Beilschmiedia delicata S.K.Lee & Y.T.Wei
- Beilschmiedia descoingsii Fouilloy
- Beilschmiedia dictyoneura Kosterm.
- Beilschmiedia dielsiana Teschner
- Beilschmiedia dilmyana Kosterm.
- Beilschmiedia dinklagei (Engl.) Robyns & R.Wilczek
- Beilschmiedia diversiflora Pierre ex Robyns & R.Wilczek
- Beilschmiedia donisii Robyns & R.Wilczek
- Beilschmiedia elata Elliot
- Beilschmiedia elegantissima Kosterm.
- Beilschmiedia elliptica C.T.White & W.D.Francis
- Beilschmiedia emarginata (Meisn.) Kosterm.
- Beilschmiedia erythrophloia Hayata
- Beilschmiedia fasciata H.W.Li
- Beilschmiedia fluminensis Kosterm.
- Beilschmiedia foliosa (S.Moore) Robyns & R.Wilczek
- Beilschmiedia fordii Dunn
- Beilschmiedia fruticosa Engl.
- Beilschmiedia fulva Robyns & R.Wilczek
- Beilschmiedia furfuracea Chun ex Hung T.Chang
- Beilschmiedia gaboonensis (Meisn.) Benth. & Hook.f. ex B.D.Jacks.
- Beilschmiedia gallatlyi M.Gangop.
- Beilschmiedia gaurii (M.Gangop.) Rasingam & Chakrab.
- Beilschmiedia gemmiflora (Blume) Kosterm.
- Beilschmiedia gigantocarpa Kosterm.
- Beilschmiedia gilbertii Robyns & R.Wilczek
- Beilschmiedia giorgii Robyns & R.Wilczek
- Beilschmiedia gitingensis (Elmer) Kosterm.
- Beilschmiedia glabra Kosterm.
- Beilschmiedia glandulosa N.H.Xia, F.N.Wei & Y.F.Deng
- Beilschmiedia glauciphylla Kosterm.
- Beilschmiedia glomerata Merr.
- Beilschmiedia grandibracteata Robyns & R.Wilczek
- Beilschmiedia grandifolia (Stapf) Robyns & R.Wilczek
- Beilschmiedia gynotrochioides Kosterm.
- Beilschmiedia hartonoana Sach.Nishida
- Beilschmiedia henghsienensis S.K.Lee & Y.T.Wei
- Beilschmiedia hermanii Robyns & R.Wilczek
- Beilschmiedia hexanthera van der Werff
- Beilschmiedia hondurensis Kosterm.
- Beilschmiedia hutchinsoniana Robyns & R.Wilczek
- Beilschmiedia immersinervis Sachiko Nishida
- Beilschmiedia insignis Gamble
- Beilschmiedia insularum Robyns & R.Wilczek
- Beilschmiedia intermedia C.K.Allen
- Beilschmiedia jabassensis (Engl. & K.Krause) Robyns & R.Wilczek
- Beilschmiedia jacobii Robi, Udayan & S.George
- Beilschmiedia jacques-felixii Robyns & R.Wilczek
- Beilschmiedia javanica Miq.
- Beilschmiedia keralana Robi & Balan
- Beilschmiedia kinabaluensis Kosterm.
- Beilschmiedia klainei Robyns & R.Wilczek
- Beilschmiedia kochummenii de Kok
- Beilschmiedia kostermansiana Robyns & R.Wilczek
- Beilschmiedia kunstleri Gamble
- Beilschmiedia kweichowensis C.Y.Cheng
- Beilschmiedia kweo (Mildbr.) Robyns & R.Wilczek
- Beilschmiedia laevis C.K.Allen
- Beilschmiedia lanatella Kosterm.
- Beilschmiedia lancifolia Miq.
- Beilschmiedia lancilimba Kosterm.
- Beilschmiedia laotica Kosterm. ex de Kok
- Beilschmiedia latifolia (Nees) Sachiko Nishida
- Beilschmiedia lebrunii Robyns & R.Wilczek
- Beilschmiedia ledermannii Teschner
- Beilschmiedia letouzeyi Robyns & R.Wilczek
- Beilschmiedia linharensis Sachiko Nishida & van der Werff
- Beilschmiedia linocieroides H.W.Li
- Beilschmiedia longepetiolata C.K.Allen
- Beilschmiedia longifolia Teschner
- Beilschmiedia louisii Robyns & R.Wilczek
- Beilschmiedia lucidula (Miq.) Kosterm.
- Beilschmiedia lumutensis Gamble
- Beilschmiedia macrocarpa A.Chev. ex H.Liu
- Beilschmiedia macrophylla Meisn.
- Beilschmiedia macropoda C.K.Allen
- Beilschmiedia madagascariensis (Baill.) Kosterm.
- Beilschmiedia madang (Blume) Blume
- Beilschmiedia maingayi Hook.f.
- Beilschmiedia manantlanensis Cuevas & Cochrane
- Beilschmiedia mannii (Meisn.) Benth. & Hook.f. ex B.D.Jacks.
- Beilschmiedia mannioides Robyns & R.Wilczek
- Beilschmiedia mayumbensis Robyns & R.Wilczek
- Beilschmiedia membranacea Gamble
- Beilschmiedia membranifolia Kosterm.
- Beilschmiedia mengwangensis X.B.Peng, Z.F.Liu, Lang Li & J.Li
- Beilschmiedia mexicana (Mez) Kosterm.
- Beilschmiedia michelsonii Robyns & R.Wilczek
- Beilschmiedia micrantha Merr.
- Beilschmiedia microcarpa Sach.Nishida
- Beilschmiedia microphylla (Kosterm.) Kosterm.
- Beilschmiedia miersii (Gay) Kosterm.
- Beilschmiedia minutiflora (Meisn.) Benth. & Hook.f. ex B.D.Jacks.
- Beilschmiedia montanoides Kosterm.
- Beilschmiedia moratii van der Werff
- Beilschmiedia morobensis Kosterm.
- Beilschmiedia muricata H.T.Chang
- Beilschmiedia murutensis Kosterm.
- Beilschmiedia myrciifolia (S.Moore) Robyns & R.Wilczek
- Beilschmiedia myrmecophila Kosterm.
- Beilschmiedia ndongensis (Engl. & K.Krause) Robyns & R.Wilczek
- Beilschmiedia neocaledonica Kosterm.
- Beilschmiedia neoletestui Fouilloy & N.Hallé
- Beilschmiedia ningmingensis S.K.Lee & Y.T.Wei
- Beilschmiedia nitida Engl.
- Beilschmiedia novae-britanniae Kosterm.
- Beilschmiedia novoguineensis Teschner
- Beilschmiedia obconica C.K.Allen
- Beilschmiedia oblonga Kosterm.
- Beilschmiedia oblongifolia Robyns & R.Wilczek
- Beilschmiedia obovatifoliosa Lecomte
- Beilschmiedia obscurinervia H.T.Chang
- Beilschmiedia obtusifolia (F.Muell. ex Meisn.) F.Muell.
- Beilschmiedia oligandra L.S.Sm.
- Beilschmiedia oligantha Sach.Nishida
- Beilschmiedia olivacea Robyns & R.Wilczek
- Beilschmiedia opposita Kosterm.
- Beilschmiedia oreophila Schltr.
- Beilschmiedia osacola Aguilar, D.Santam. & van der Werff
- Beilschmiedia ovalioides Sachiko Nishida
- Beilschmiedia ovalis (S.F.Blake) C.K.Allen
- Beilschmiedia ovoidea F.N.Wei
- Beilschmiedia palembanica (Miq.) Kosterm.
- Beilschmiedia papyracea (Stapf) Robyns & R.Wilczek
- Beilschmiedia pauciflora H.W.Li
- Beilschmiedia paulocordata Fouilloy & N.Hallé
- Beilschmiedia pedicellata van der Werff
- Beilschmiedia pellegrinii Fouilloy & N.Hallé
- Beilschmiedia penangiana Gamble
- Beilschmiedia pendula (Sw.) Hemsl.
- Beilschmiedia peninsularis B.Hyland
- Beilschmiedia percoriacea C.K.Allen
- Beilschmiedia pergamentacea C.K.Allen
- Beilschmiedia phoebeopsis Kosterm.
- Beilschmiedia pierreana Robyns & R.Wilczek
- Beilschmiedia pilosa Kosterm.
- Beilschmiedia podagrica Kosterm.
- Beilschmiedia poilanei H.Liu
- Beilschmiedia preussii Engl.
- Beilschmiedia preussioides Fouilloy & N.Hallé
- Beilschmiedia pubescens Teschner
- Beilschmiedia pullenii Kosterm.
- Beilschmiedia punctilimba H.W.Li
- Beilschmiedia purpurascens H.W.Li
- Beilschmiedia recurva B.Hyland
- Beilschmiedia reticulata Kosterm.
- Beilschmiedia rigida (Mez ex Taub.) Kosterm.
- Beilschmiedia riparia Miranda
- Beilschmiedia rivularis Kosterm.
- Beilschmiedia robertsonii Gamble
- Beilschmiedia robusta C.K.Allen
- Beilschmiedia robynsiana Kosterm.
- Beilschmiedia rosseliana Kosterm.
- Beilschmiedia roxburghiana Nees
- Beilschmiedia rufohirtella H.W.Li
- Beilschmiedia rufolanata Kosterm.
- Beilschmiedia rufoperulata Kosterm.
- Beilschmiedia rugosa van der Werff
- Beilschmiedia rwandensis R.Wilczek
- Beilschmiedia sary Kosterm.
- Beilschmiedia schmitzii Robyns & R.Wilczek
- Beilschmiedia scintillans (Kosterm.) van der Werff & Sach.Nishida
- Beilschmiedia scortechinii Gamble
- Beilschmiedia sericans Kosterm.
- Beilschmiedia sericea Teschner
- Beilschmiedia sessilifolia (Stapf) Engl. ex Fouilloy
- Beilschmiedia shangsiensis Y.T.Wei
- Beilschmiedia sichourensis H.W.Li
- Beilschmiedia sikkimensis King ex Hook.f.
- Beilschmiedia staudtii Engl.
- Beilschmiedia steyermarkii C.K.Allen
- Beilschmiedia stricta Kosterm.
- Beilschmiedia sulcata (Ruiz & Pav.) Kosterm.
- Beilschmiedia superba Kosterm.
- Beilschmiedia supraglandulosa Y.K.Li
- Beilschmiedia talbotiae (S.Moore) Robyns & R.Wilczek
- Beilschmiedia tarairi (A.Cunn.) Kirk
- Beilschmiedia taubertiana (Schwacke & Mez) Kosterm.
- Beilschmiedia tawa (A.Cunn.) Kirk
- Beilschmiedia tawaensis Merr.
- Beilschmiedia tawaroa A.E.Wright
- Beilschmiedia telupidensis Sach.Nishida
- Beilschmiedia thollonii Robyns & R.Wilczek
- Beilschmiedia tilaranensis Sachiko Nishida
- Beilschmiedia tirunelvelica Manickam, Murugan, Jothi & Sundaresan
- Beilschmiedia tooram (F.M.Bailey) B.Hyland
- Beilschmiedia tovarensis (Klotzsch & H.Karst. ex Meisn.) Sachiko Nishida
- Beilschmiedia triplinervis Teschner
- Beilschmiedia troupinii R.Wilczek
- Beilschmiedia tsangii Merr.
- Beilschmiedia tungfangensis S.K.Lee & L.F.Lau
- Beilschmiedia turbinata Bing Liu & Y.Yang
- Beilschmiedia ugandensis Rendle
- Beilschmiedia variabilis Robyns & R.Wilczek
- Beilschmiedia velutina (Kosterm.) Kosterm.
- Beilschmiedia vermoesenii Robyns & R.Wilczek
- Beilschmiedia versicolor Kosterm.
- Beilschmiedia vestita L.C.S.Assis & M.F.Santos
- Beilschmiedia vidalii Kosterm.
- Beilschmiedia villosa Kosterm.
- Beilschmiedia vohemarensis van der Werff
- Beilschmiedia volckii B.Hyland
- Beilschmiedia wallichiana (G.Don) Kosterm.
- Beilschmiedia wangii C.K.Allen
- Beilschmiedia weii Y.S.Huang, H.M.Tan & Yan Liu
- Beilschmiedia wieringae Kosterm.
- Beilschmiedia wightii (Nees) Benth. ex Hook.f.
- Beilschmiedia wilczekii Fouilloy
- Beilschmiedia xizangensis H.P.Tsui
- Beilschmiedia yangambiensis Robyns & R.Wilczek
- Beilschmiedia yunnanensis Hu
- Beilschmiedia zahnii (K.Krause) Robyns & R.Wilczek
- Beilschmiedia zapoteoides (Lundell) Kosterm.
- Beilschmiedia zenkeri Engl.
