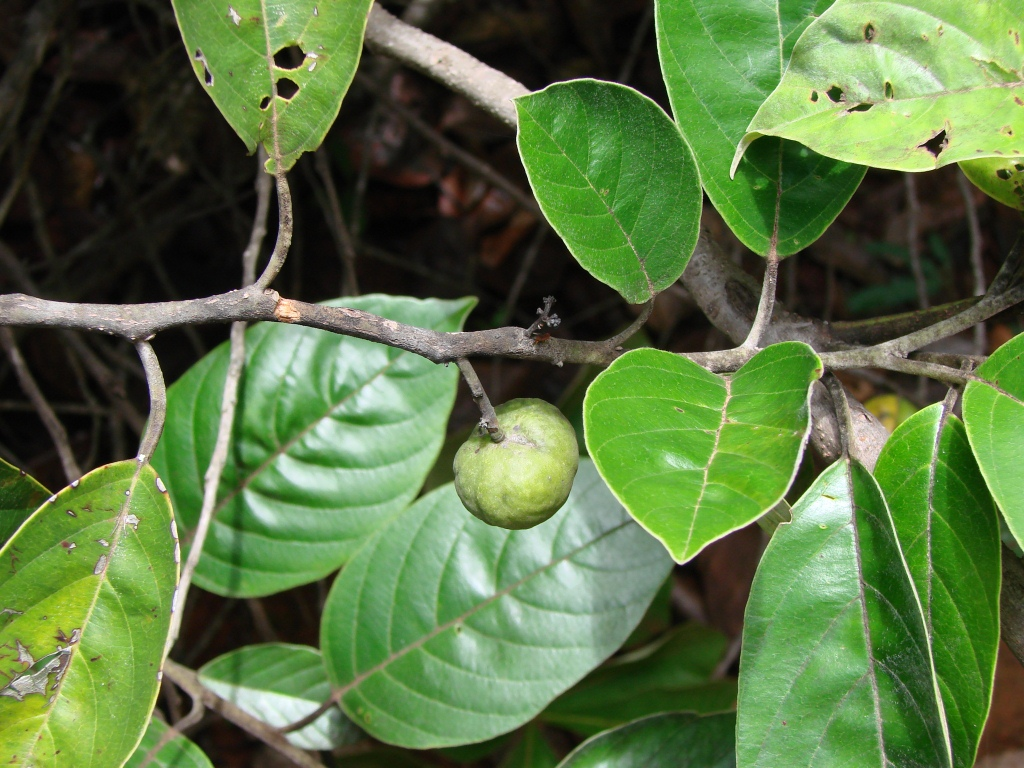
- Emmotum nitens

Scientific classification
- Kingdom: Plantae
- Clade: Tracheophytes
- Clade: Angiosperms
- Clade: Eudicots
- Clade: Asterids
- Order: Metteniusales
- Family: Metteniusaceae
- Genus: Emmotum; Desvaux ex Hamilton

Type species
- Emmotum fagifolium Hamilton

Species
- 14 species, see text

= Emmotum =

Genus of flowering plants

Emmotum is a genus of flowering plants in the family Metteniusaceae. It was formerly placed in the family Icacinaceae. It has about 13 species. One of these species, E. harleyi, was described in 2007.

== Description ==
Emmotum is a genus of shrubs and trees. The flowers are small and white. The inner surface of the petals is conspicuously hairy. Emmotum has a 3-locular ovary.

== Taxonomy ==
The type species for Emmotum is E. fagifolium W. Hamilton.

Emmotum is divided into two sections: Emmotum and Brevistyla. Section Brevistyla comprises four species and had formerly been treated as a separate genus.

Emmotum was named by Desvaux and Hamilton (1783–1856) in 1825. George Bentham described the genus Pogopetalum in 1841, but John Miers recognized that it was the same as Emmotum, described earlier. Because the earlier name has priority, Pogopetalum is no longer a correct name.

Emmotum belongs to an informal group of six genera known as the Emmotum group, that was formerly placed in family Icacinaceae. These genera are: Calatola, Ottoschulzia, Oecopetalum, Poraqueiba, Emmotum, and Platea. Platea is native to Asia, while the others are from the New World. In the past, a separate family Emmotaceae was established with two genera, both having three carpels. The APG IV system places this group in the family Metteniusaceae.

== Species ==
Species include:

- Emmotum conjunctum
- Emmotum fagifolium Hamilton
- Emmotum harleyi
- Emmotum nitens
