= Platea =

Platea may refer to:

- Plataea, an ancient Greek city-state in Boeotia
- Platea, Pennsylvania, a borough in Erie County, Pennsylvania, United States
- Platea (plant), a genus of plants
- Plataea (moth), a genus of moths
