= Platystigma =

Platystigma may refer to:

- Platystigma (dragonfly), a genus of dragonflies in the family Coenagrionidae
- Platystigma (plant), a genus of plants in the family Papaveraceae
- Platystigma, a genus of plants in the family Metteniusaceae, synonym of Platea
