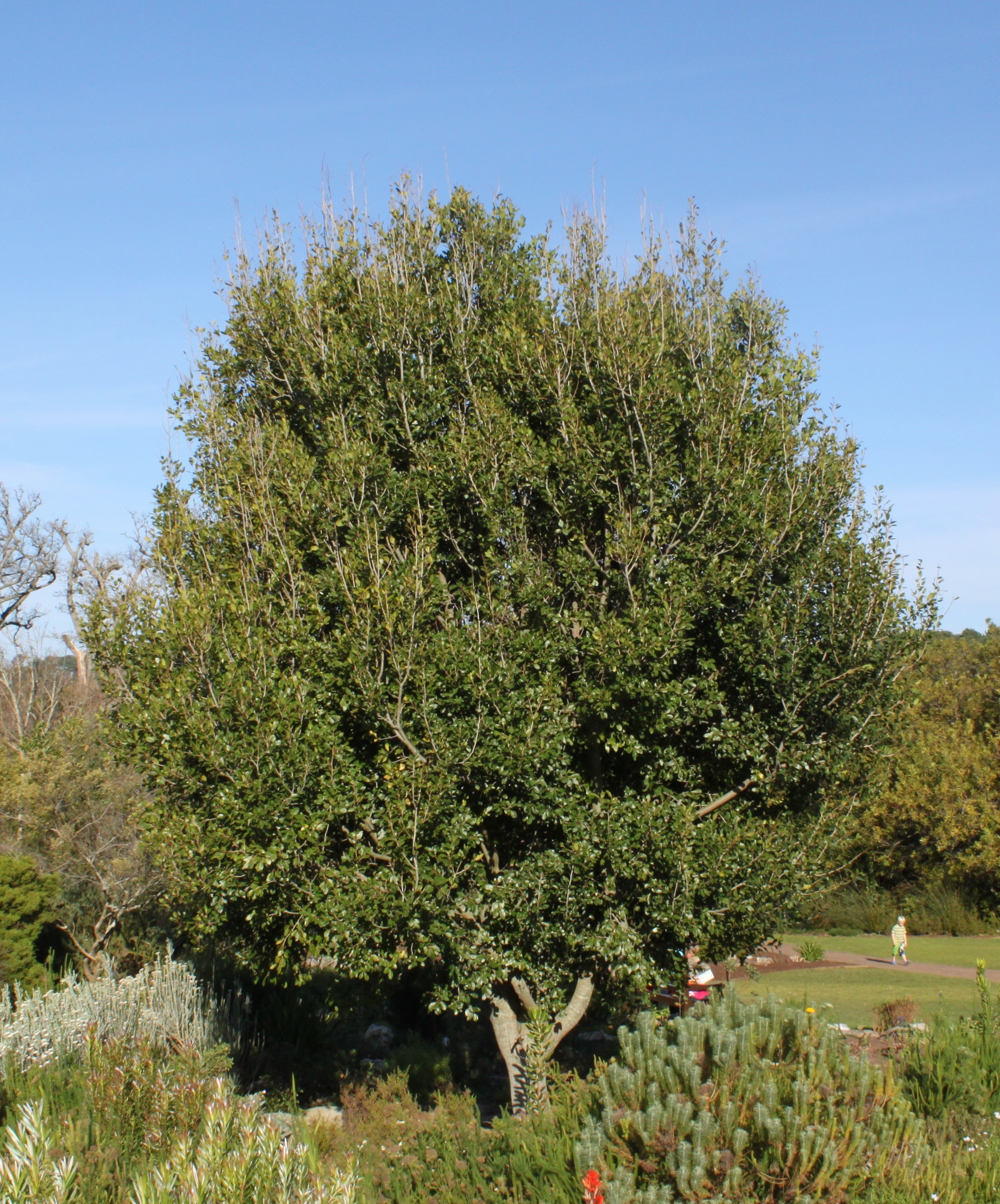

Scientific classification
- Kingdom: Plantae
- Clade: Tracheophytes
- Clade: Angiosperms
- Clade: Eudicots
- Clade: Asterids
- Order: Metteniusales
- Family: Metteniusaceae
- Genus: Apodytes
- Species: A. dimidiata

Binomial name
- Apodytes dimidiata E.Mey. ex Arn.

Synonyms
- Apodytes acutifolia Hochst. ex A.Rich.; Apodytes beddomei Mast.; Apodytes benthamiana Wight; Apodytes bequaertii De Wild.; Apodytes cambodiana Pierre; Apodytes curtisii Dyer ex King; Apodytes dimidiata subsp. acutifolia (Hochst. ex A.Rich.) Cufod.; Apodytes dimidiata var. acutifolia (Hochst. ex A.Rich.) Boutique; Apodytes dimidiata var. emirnensis (Baker) H.Perrier; Apodytes dimidiata f. farinosa H.Perrier; Apodytes dimidiata var. hazomaitso (Danguy) H.Perrier; Apodytes dimidiata var. ikongoensis H.Perrier; Apodytes dimidiata var. inversa (Baill.) H.Perrier; Apodytes dimidiata f. microphylla H.Perrier; Apodytes emirnensis Baker; Apodytes frappieri Cordem.; Apodytes gardneriana Miers; Apodytes giung A.Chev.; Apodytes hazomaitso Danguy; Apodytes imerinensis Baker; Apodytes inversa Baill.; Apodytes javanica Koord. & Valeton; Apodytes mauritiana (Miers) Benth. & Hook.f. ex B.D.Jacks.; Apodytes mauritiana Benth. & Hook. f.; Apodytes stuhlmannii Engl.; Apodytes tonkinensis Gagnep.; Apodytes yunnanensis Hu; Hemilobium ficifolium Welw.; Icacina mauritiana Miers; Mappia philippinensis Merr.; Neoleretia philippinensis (Merr.) Baehni; Nothapodytes philippinensis (Merr.) Sleumer

= Apodytes dimidiata =

White pear

Species of tree

Apodytes dimidiata (white pear or umDakane) is a bushy tree with white flowers bearing a fragrance reminiscent of fresh coconut, and small black and red fruits. It is usually about 5 m tall (but reaches a height of 20 m when growing in deep forest), and it is indigenous to Southern Africa. The taxonomical family placement for this and other Apodytes was uncertain; it is now placed in the Metteniusaceae. Its English common name is in reference to the timber which is similar in appearance to that of the European pear tree of the northern hemisphere.

== Description ==
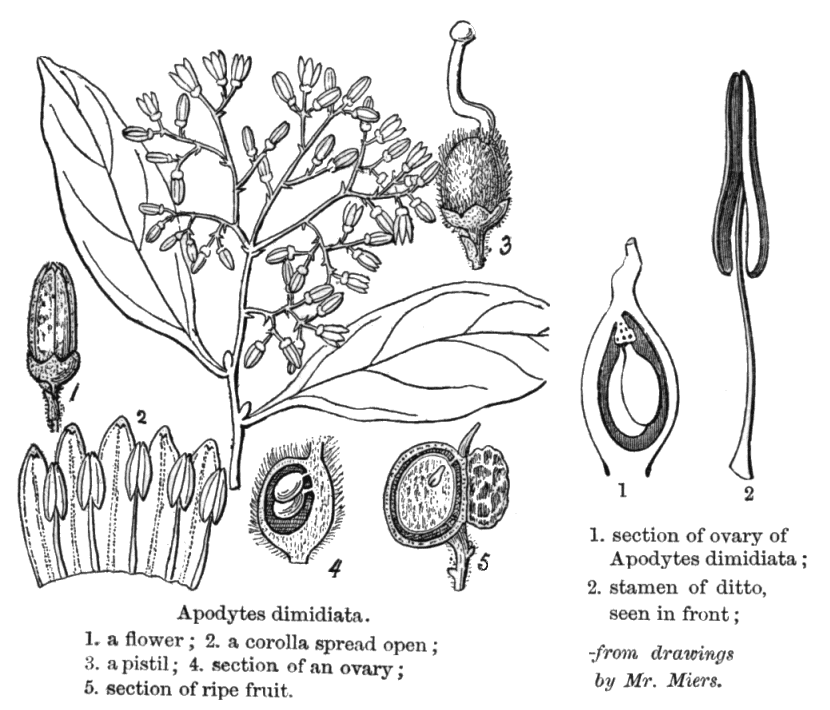
Illustration of leaves, terminal panicle, flower parts and fruit

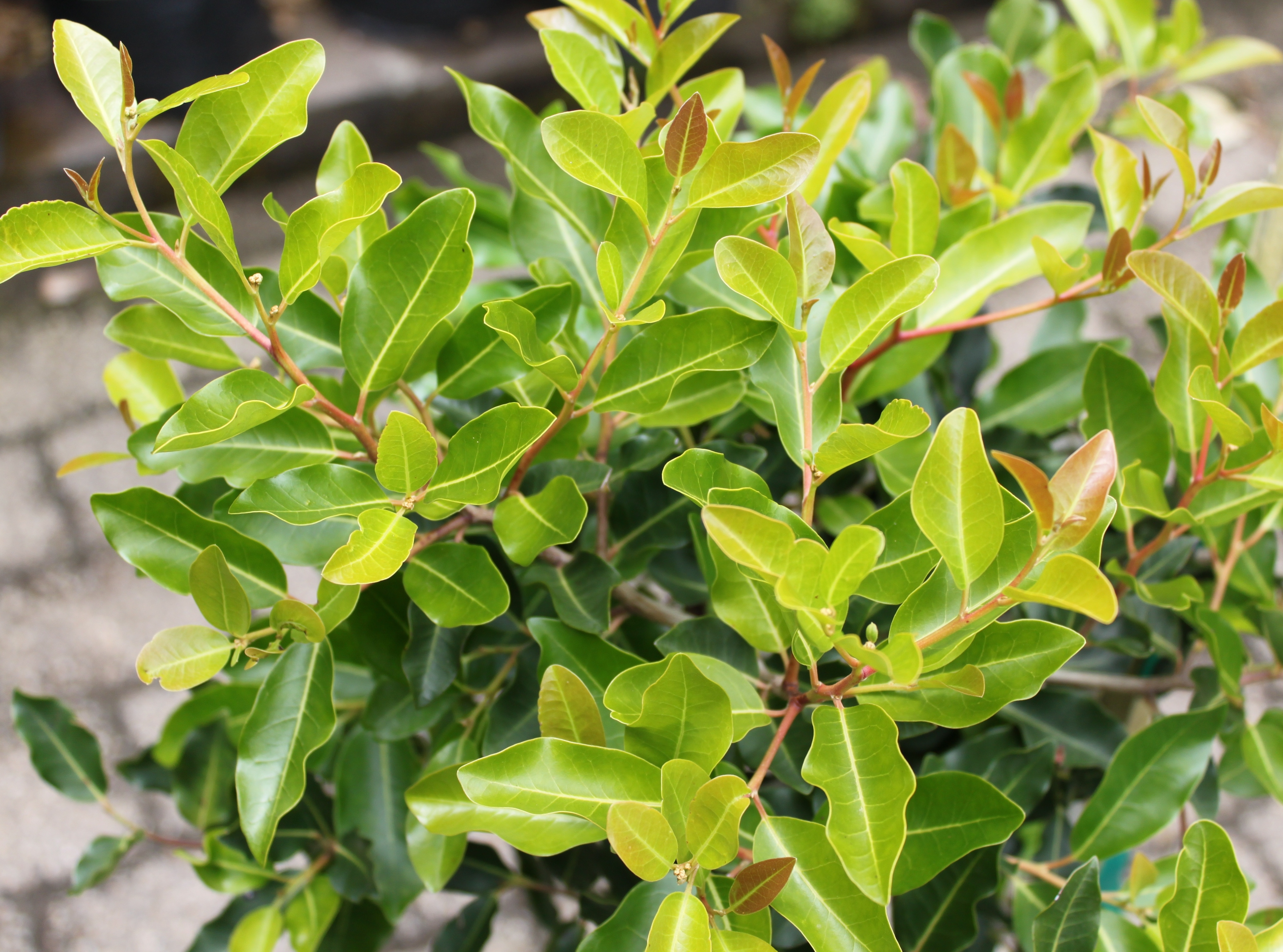
Close-up of foliage

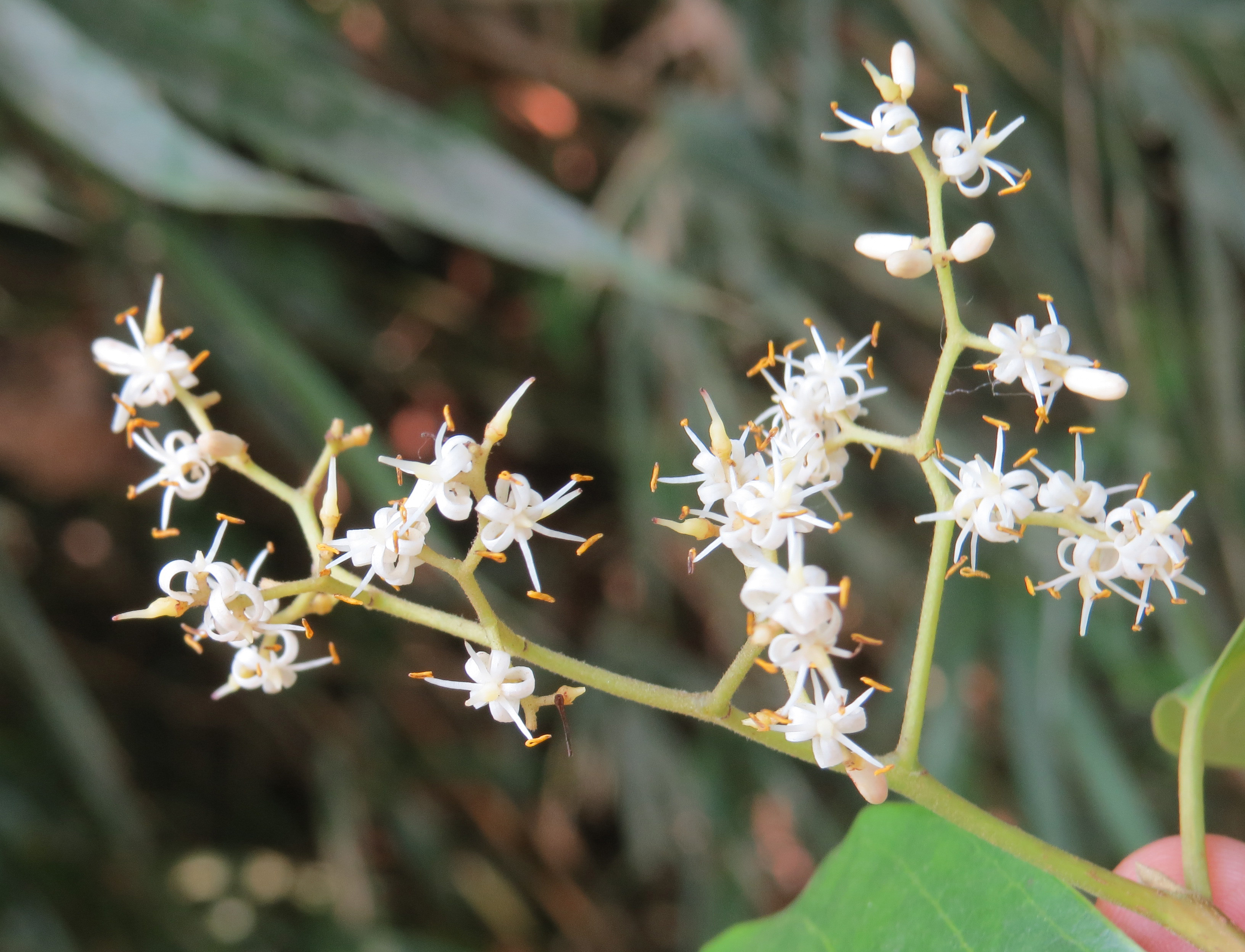
Flowers in panicle

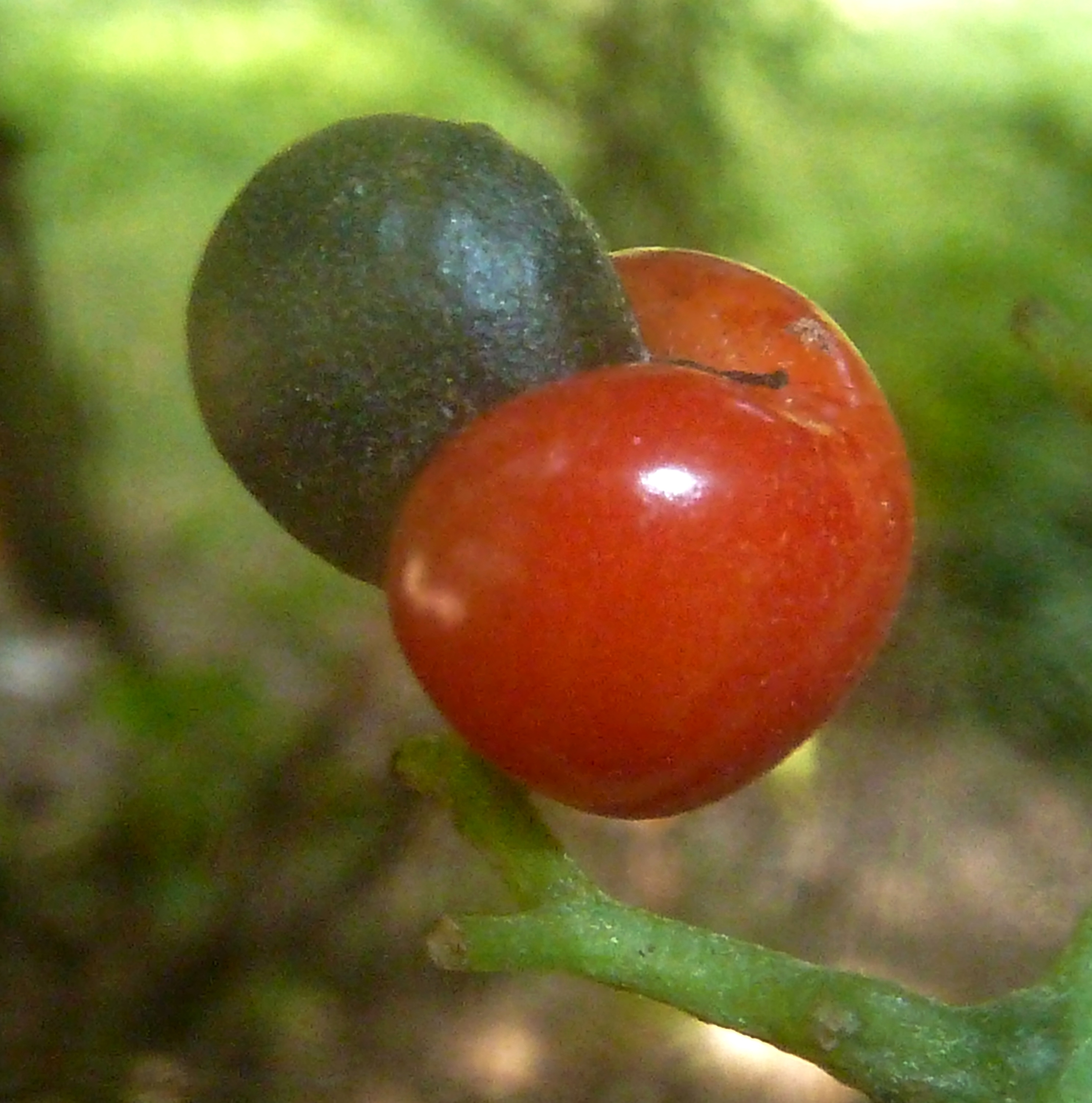
Close-up of ripe fruit

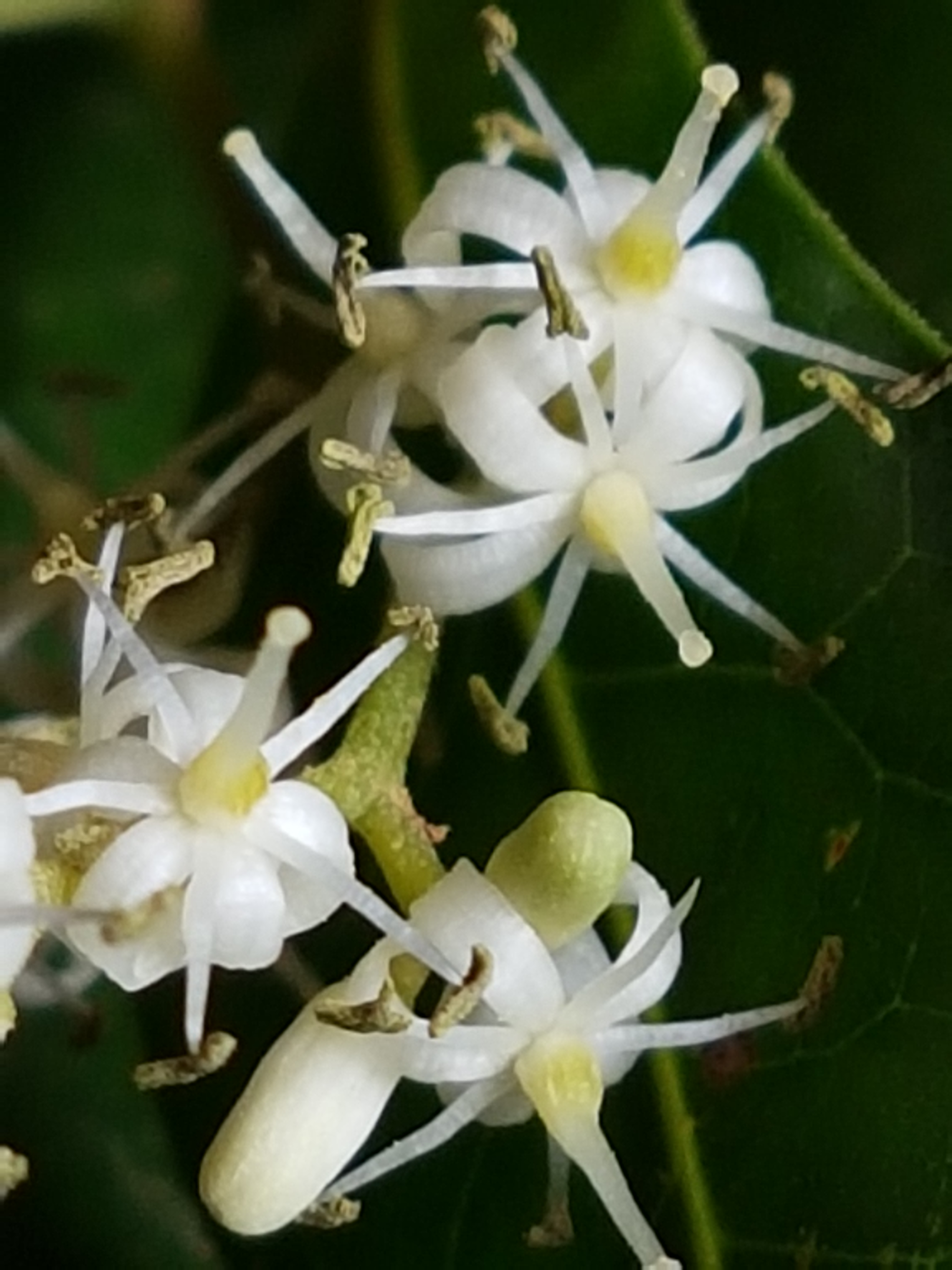
Close-up of flowers

In the open, this evergreen species grows as a tall shrub or small tree of about 5 m in height. However, in a more shady environment, such as deep afro-montane forest, it can reach a height of over 20 m. Its dense, shiny foliage is bright-green and it has smooth, gray bark. It frequently produces masses of tiny, white, bisexual blossoms which have a sweet fragrance. These are followed by strangely curved, black and scarlet berries. In South Africa this is officially a protected tree.

This is a very difficult tree to identify at first. In particular, it is often confused with Pterocelastrus rostratus, including at the First International Forestry Exhibition. The best identifying characteristics of Apodytes dimidiata are its petiole and young terminal branchlets which are a unique reddish colour.

== Distribution ==
Apodytes dimidiata is a prominent and common tree in South African forests. It grows naturally from Cape Town in the south, all the way along the east coast of southern Africa as far north as Kenya and inland as far as Gauteng. It is usually found in coastal thicket, afro-montane forest and mountainous bushveld.

The actual distribution has been difficult to determine due to large number of synonyms (about 30+) used for this particular species in various countries. According to the synonyms usage, it is thought that the species has much broader distribution than was thought earlier, and may spread towards the Indian subcontinent as well.

== Cultivation ==
This tree's characteristics (evergreen attractive foliage; fruits that are not fleshy and therefore will not cause a mess; and a gentle non-invasive root system that will not damage paving) mean that Apodytes dimidiata is an ideal tree to plant around paved areas, near swimming pools, next to buildings, in small gardens and also anywhere that may need shade throughout the year.

The white pear is best propagated by seed, though germination is extremely slow. The seed takes about half a year to germinate and the young plants are also relatively slow growing. However, these trees grow very much faster as they become larger and more established.
