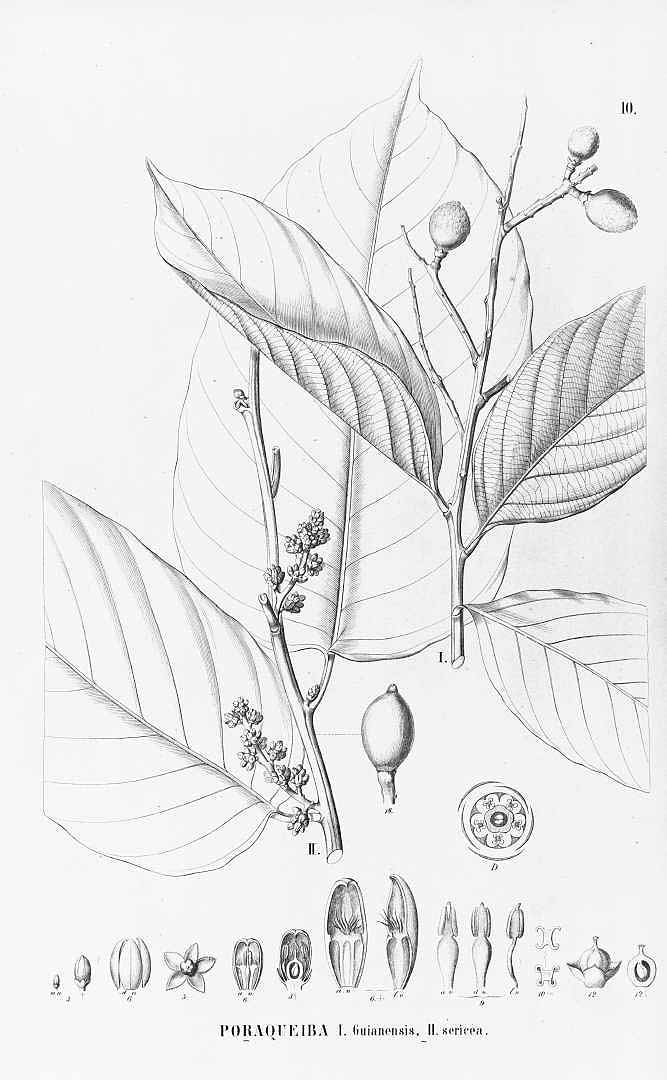
- Branchlets of Poraqueiba sericea (left) and Poraqueiba guianensis (right)

Scientific classification
- Kingdom: Plantae
- Clade: Tracheophytes
- Clade: Angiosperms
- Clade: Eudicots
- Clade: Asterids
- Order: Metteniusales
- Family: Metteniusaceae
- Genus: Poraqueiba
- Species: P. sericea

Binomial name
- Poraqueiba sericea Tul.

Synonyms
- Poraqueiba acuminata Miers

= Poraqueiba sericea =

Species of tree

Poraqueiba sericea (common name: umari) is a species of tree in the family Metteniusaceae. It is native to South America.

== Description ==
P. sericea trees grow up to 30 m tall and 60 cm dbh. Bark somewhat smooth or rough, dark brown or slightly purple. Leaves broadly elliptic-ovate, coriaceous, 17–24 cm long, 8–15 cm wide, apex acuminate, base rounded. Inflorescence a terminal or axillary panicle, 5–10 cm long, flowers with ovate lanceolate petals 0.3-0.4 mm long. The fruit is a smooth ovoid-oblong drupe, 5–10 cm long, 4–6 cm wide; it can be yellowish green, orange, dark purple or black when mature.

== Distribution and habitat ==
P. sericea is found in the western and central Amazon rainforest in Venezuela, Colombia, Peru and Brazil.

== Uses ==
The fruit is edible, but the taste may not be good for people unfamiliar with the fruit.

The wood is of medium or somewhat coarse texture; heavy, compact and durable. It is used for carpentry and fuel.
