= Metteniusa santanderensis =

Conservation status
- Critically Endangered (IUCN 3.1)

Scientific classification
- Kingdom: Plantae
- Clade: Tracheophytes
- Clade: Angiosperms
- Clade: Eudicots
- Clade: Asterids
- Order: Metteniusales
- Family: Metteniusaceae
- Genus: Metteniusa
- Species: M. santaderensis

Binomial name
- Metteniusa santaderensis Lozano

Species of flowering plant

Metteniusa santanderensis is a species of flowering plants in the family Metteniusaceae. It was formerly placed in the family Cardiopteridaceae. It is endemic to Colombia.
