= M. edulis =

M. edulis may refer to:

- Maerua edulis (Gilg. & Ben.) De Wolf, a plant species in the genus Maerua
- Metteniusa edulis, a plant species endemic to Colombia
- Mytilus edulis, the blue mussel, a medium-sized edible marine bivalve mollusc species

== See also ==
- Edulis (disambiguation)
