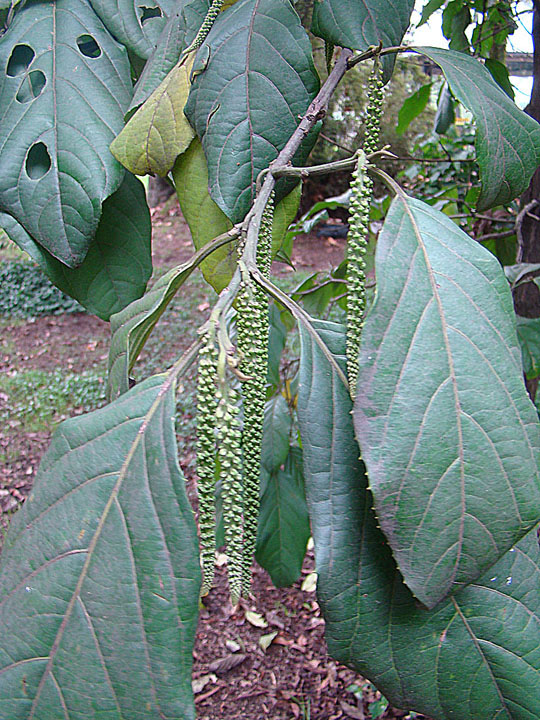

Conservation status
- Least Concern (IUCN 3.1)

Scientific classification
- Kingdom: Plantae
- Clade: Embryophytes
- Clade: Tracheophytes
- Clade: Angiosperms
- Clade: Eudicots
- Clade: Asterids
- Order: Metteniusales
- Family: Metteniusaceae
- Genus: Calatola
- Species: C. costaricensis

Binomial name
- Calatola costaricensis Standl.

Synonyms
- Calatola columbiana Sleumer, 1940; Calatola sanquininensis Cuatrec., 1949; Calatola venezuelana Pittier, 1938

= Calatola costaricensis =

Species of flowering plant

Calatola costaricensis is a lower-storey rainforest tree in the family Metteniusaceae, reaching up to 15 m (49 ft) in height. It is found from southern Mexico to northern South America. It is notable for the size of its deeply sculpted seeds, which are up to 7 cm (2.8 in) in length by about 5 cm (2.0 in) wide.
