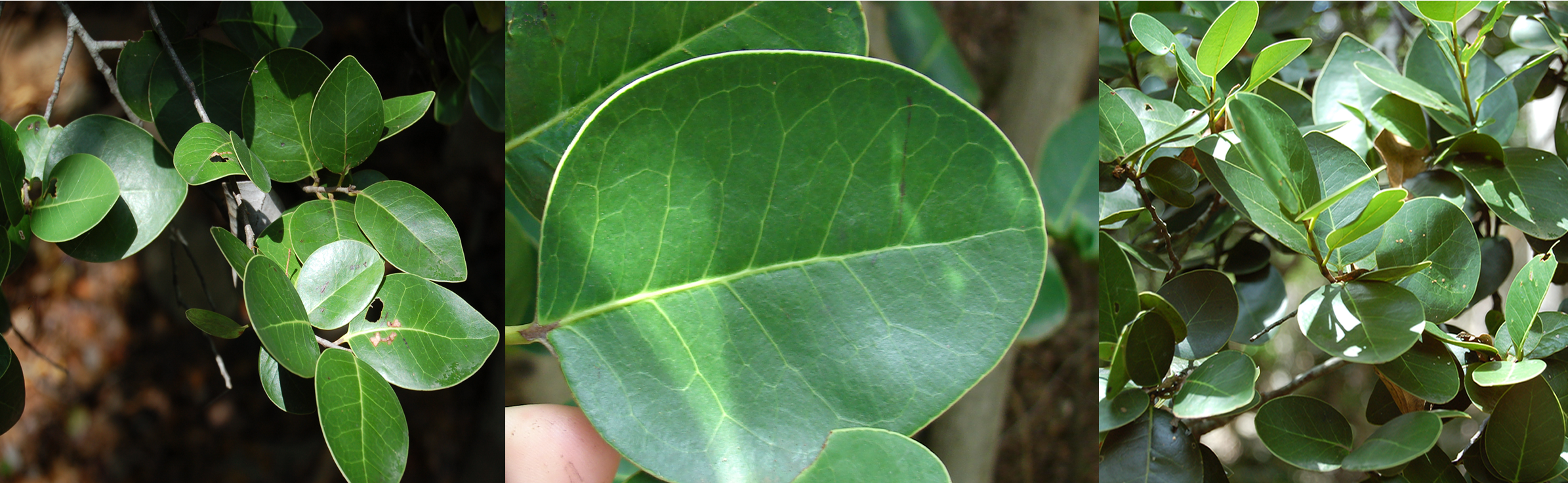

Conservation status
- Endangered (ESA)

Scientific classification
- Kingdom: Plantae
- Clade: Tracheophytes
- Clade: Angiosperms
- Clade: Eudicots
- Clade: Asterids
- Order: Metteniusales
- Family: Metteniusaceae
- Genus: Ottoschulzia
- Species: O. rhodoxylon

Binomial name
- Ottoschulzia rhodoxylon Urb.

= Ottoschulzia rhodoxylon =

Palo de rosa

Species of plant

Ottoschulzia rhodoxylon is a rare species of tree in the family Icacinaceae known by the common name pincho palo de rosa. It is native to Puerto Rico and Hispaniola (in the Dominican Republic).

== Description ==
This plant reaches up to approximately 49 feet in height. Its trunk can reach 16 inches in diameter. The leaves are alternate, elliptical or ovate, coriaceous and glossy with a slightly white margin. The flowers of this genus are small and composed of five sepals united at the base, and a corolla with a short tube in the shape of a cup and five lobes. The fruit is about 0.98 inches long and 0.86 inches wide, smooth and with a thin cover that turns dark purple when ripe.

== Conservation ==
When it was listed as an endangered species under the United States' Endangered Species Act in 1990 there were only nine individuals remaining on Puerto Rico.

In Puerto Rico, the tree is known from Guánica Commonwealth Forest and one location near Bayamón, and there has been a sighting of one individual in Maricao Commonwealth Forest. Deforestation has reduced the amount of suitable habitat remaining for the tree.
