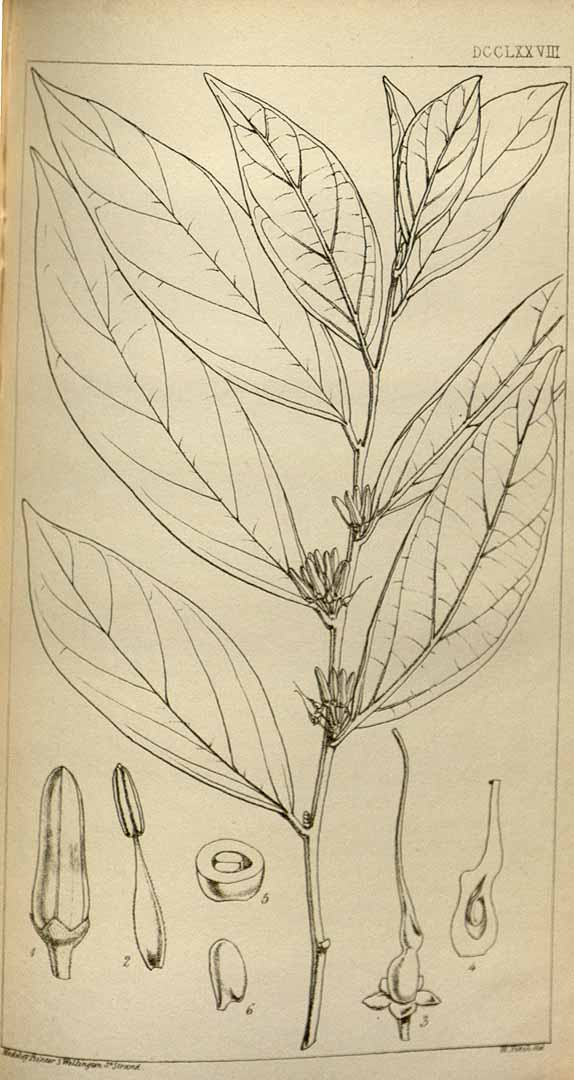

Scientific classification
- Kingdom: Plantae
- Clade: Tracheophytes
- Clade: Angiosperms
- Clade: Eudicots
- Clade: Asterids
- Order: Metteniusales
- Family: Metteniusaceae
- Genus: Rhaphiostylis
- Species: R. beninensis

Binomial name
- Rhaphiostylis beninensis (Hook.f. ex Planch.) Planch. ex Benth.

Synonyms
- Apodytes beninensis Hook.f. ex Planch.; Rhaphiostylis zenkeri Engl. (1909); Rhaphiostylis latifolia Pierre (1897); Rhaphiostylis scandens Engl. (1909); Rhaphiostylis jollyana Pierre (1897); Ptychopetalum cuspidatum R. E. Fr. (1914); Rhaphiostylis stuhlmannii Engl. (1893); Rhaphiostylis heudelotii Planch. ex Miers

= Rhaphiostylis beninensis =

Species of shrub

Rhaphiostylis beninensis is a woody, sprawling or scrambling glabrous, evergreen shrub or liane native to Tropical Africa, belonging to the family Metteniusaceae, and one of 3 species in the genus Rhaphiostylis. It is traditionally used as an anti-inflammatory by the Bantu people of Africa.

Occasionally forming thickets, it is found in or on the margins of rain-forest, where, as a climber, it reaches 10-15m in height, and rarely as a free-standing tree 5-8m. Its bark is smooth and dark grey, while young branches are reddish-brown to purple. Leaves are alternate and elliptic-lanceolate in shape with acuminate apex. Flowers in axillary clusters, white and fragrant. Fruit flattened and sub-reniform, persistent lateral style, reticulate or wrinkled, bright red turning black when ripe.

This species occurs in Liberia, Zambia, Zimbabwe, Mozambique, Senegal, Gambia, Congo and Angola.

== Citations ==
Hook., Niger Fl.: 259, t. 28 “Apodytes beninensis” (1849). — R.E.Fr., Wiss. Ergebn. Schwed. Rhod.-Kongo-Exped. 1: 130 (1914). — Engl., Pflanzenw. Afr. 3, 2: 256 (1921), “Raphiostyles”. — Sleumer in Engl. & Prantl, Nat. Pflanzenfam. ed. 2, 20b: 368 (1942). — Exell & Mendonça, C.F.A. 1, 2: 343 (1951). — Keay, F.W.T.A. ed. 2, 1, 2: 638 (1958). — Boutique, F.C.B., 9: 275 (1960). — White, F.F.N.R.: 221 (1962). TAB. 73. Type from Liberia.

== External links to images ==
- "Flora of Zimbabwe"
- Distribution map
