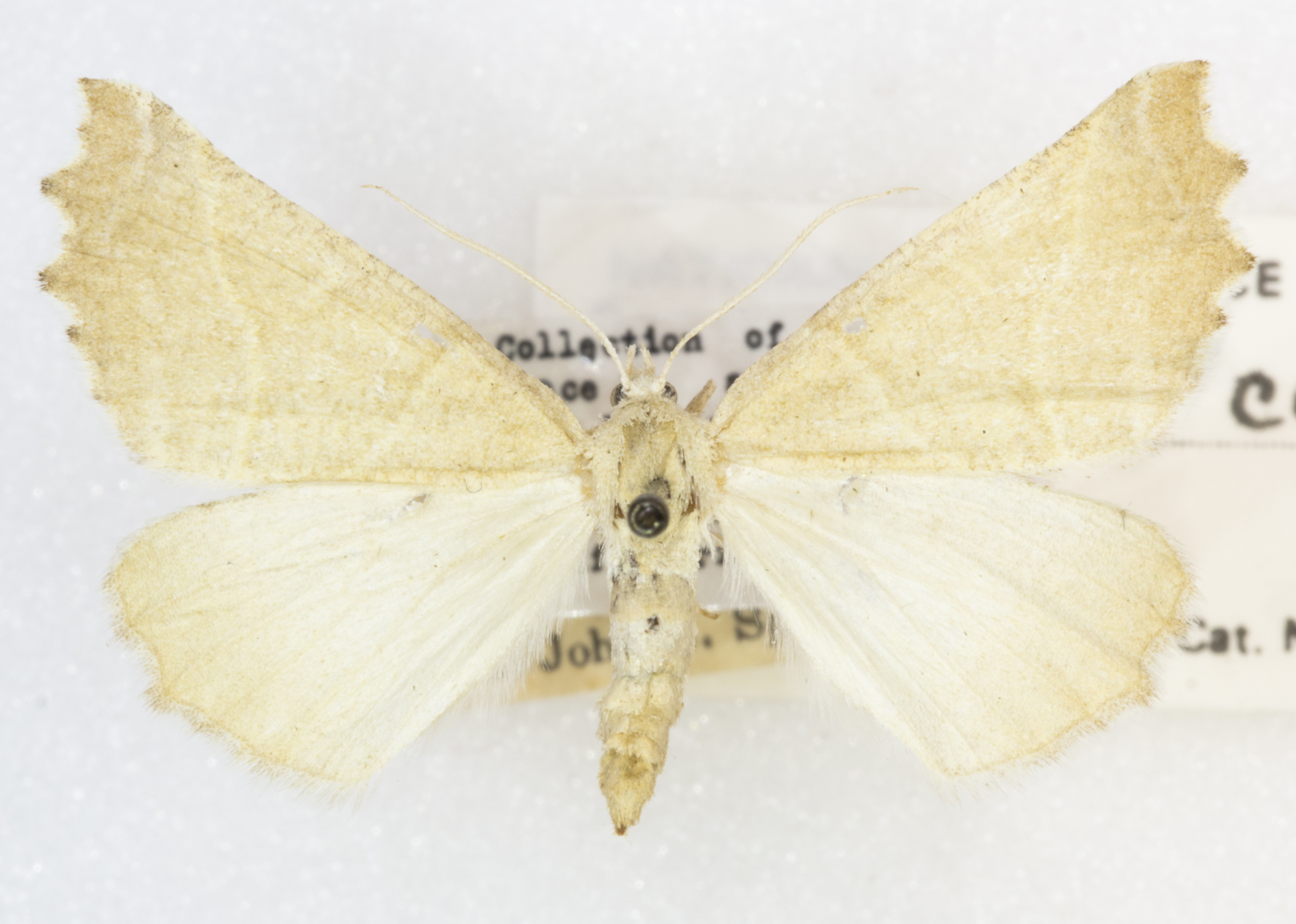
- female

Scientific classification
- Domain: Eukaryota
- Kingdom: Animalia
- Phylum: Arthropoda
- Class: Insecta
- Order: Lepidoptera
- Family: Geometridae
- Tribe: Ourapterygini
- Genus: Plataea
- Species: P. calcaria

Binomial name
- Plataea calcaria (Pearsall, 1911)

= Plataea calcaria =

Species of moth

Plataea calcaria is a species of geometrid moth in the family Geometridae. It is found in North America.

The MONA or Hodges number for Plataea calcaria is 6921.
