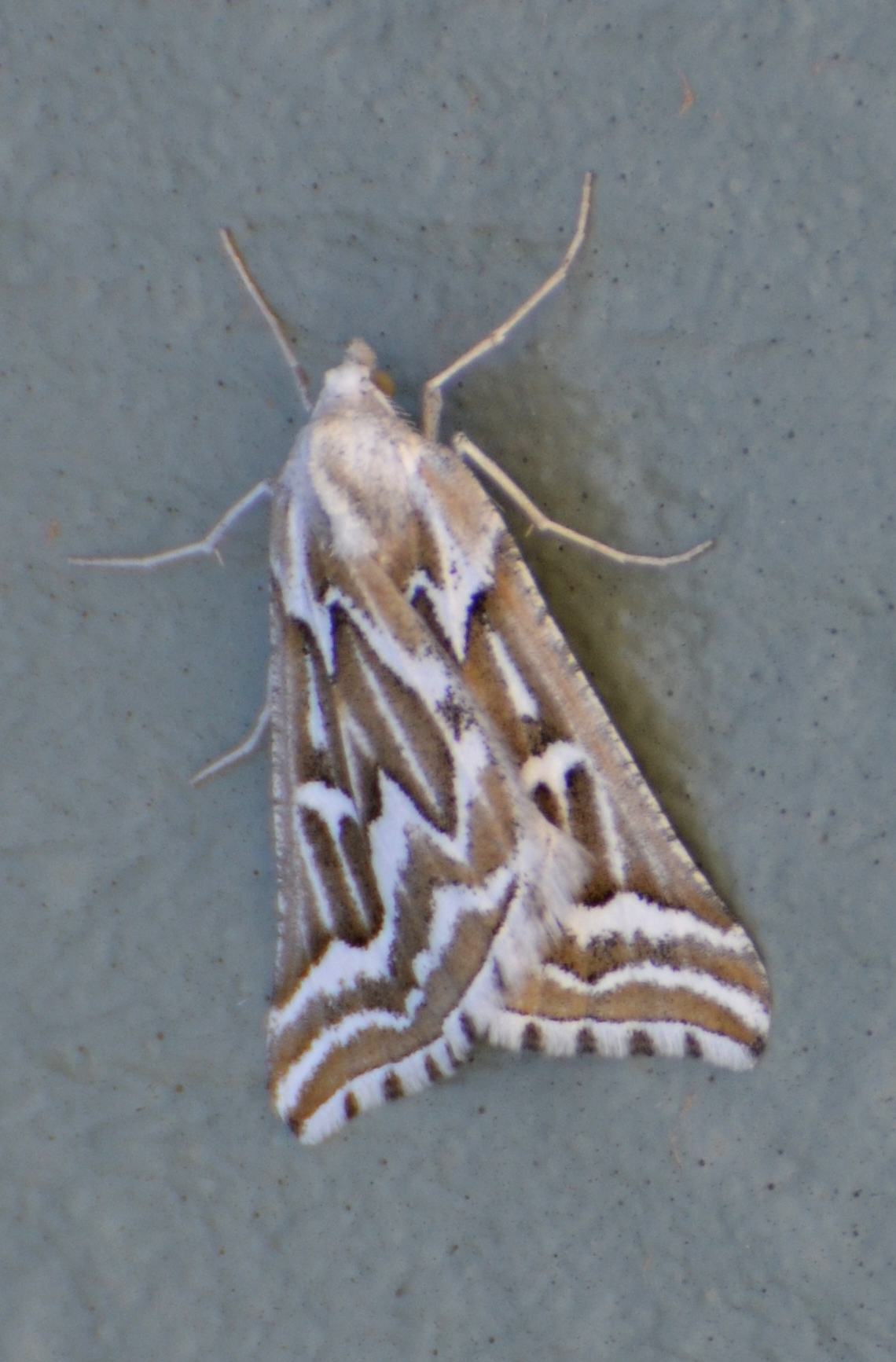

Scientific classification
- Kingdom: Animalia
- Phylum: Arthropoda
- Clade: Pancrustacea
- Class: Insecta
- Order: Lepidoptera
- Family: Geometridae
- Genus: Plataea
- Species: P. trilinearia

Binomial name
- Plataea trilinearia (Packard, 1873)

= Plataea trilinearia =

Species of moth

Plataea trilinearia, the sagebrush girdle, is a species of geometrid moth in the family Geometridae. It is found in North America.

The MONA or Hodges number for Plataea trilinearia is 6926.
