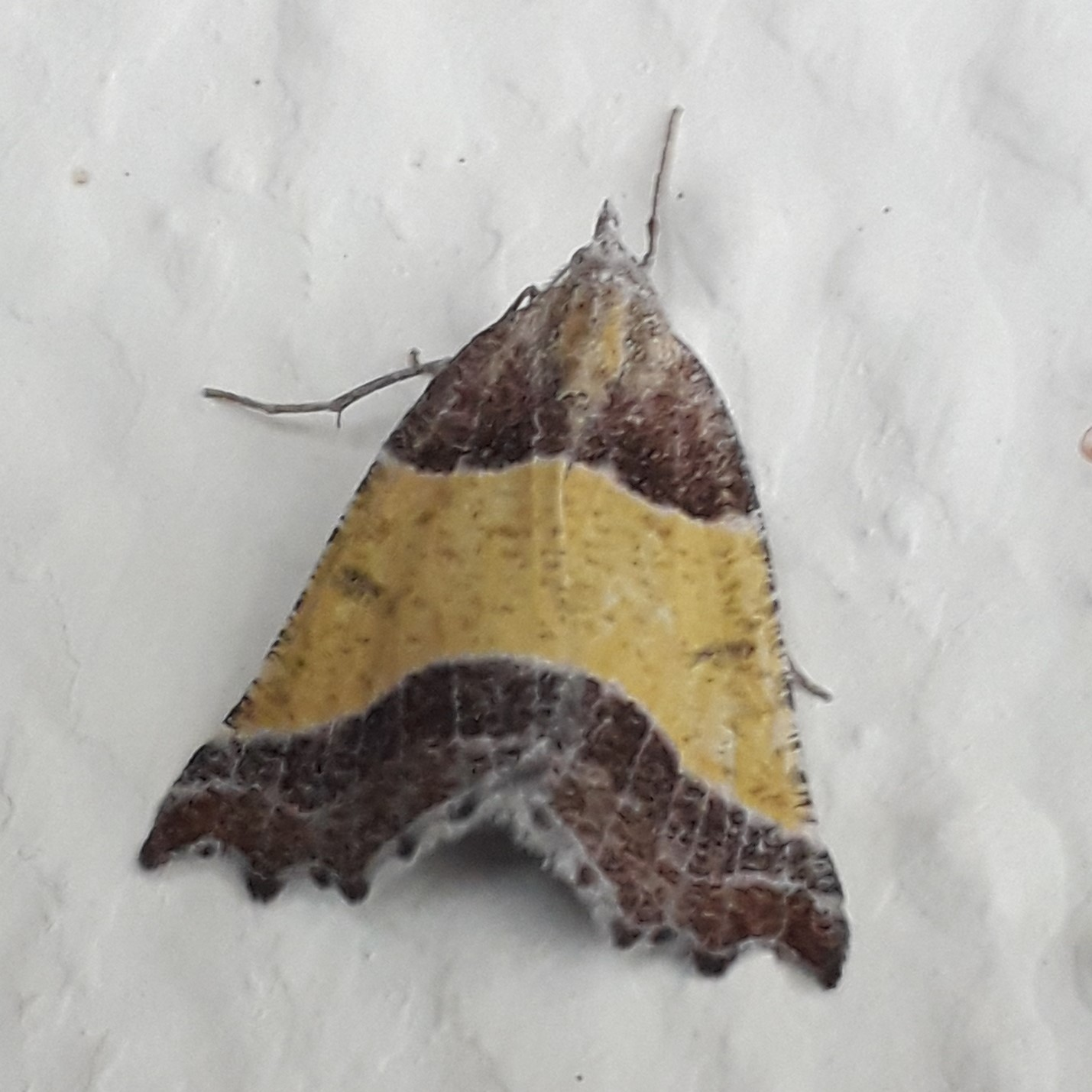

Scientific classification
- Kingdom: Animalia
- Phylum: Arthropoda
- Class: Insecta
- Order: Lepidoptera
- Family: Geometridae
- Tribe: Ourapterygini
- Genus: Plataea
- Species: P. polychroma

Binomial name
- Plataea polychroma Ferris & McFarland, 2010

= Plataea polychroma =

Species of moth

Plataea polychroma is a species of geometrid moth in the family Geometridae. It is found in North America.
