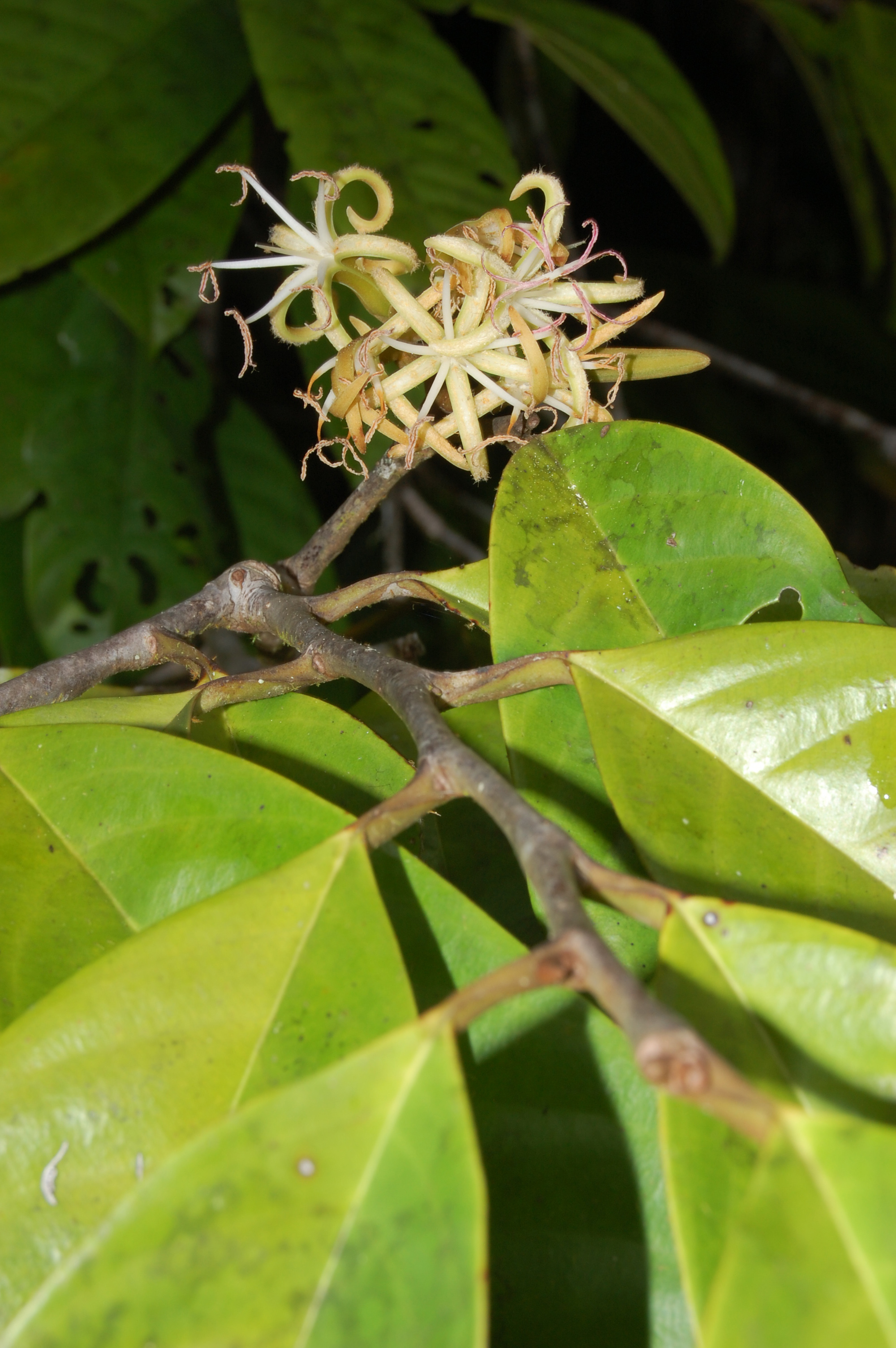
- Metteniusa tessmanniana

Scientific classification
- Kingdom: Plantae
- Clade: Tracheophytes
- Clade: Angiosperms
- Clade: Eudicots
- Clade: Asterids
- Order: Metteniusales
- Family: Metteniusaceae
- Genus: Metteniusa; H.Karst.

Species
- Metteniusa cogolloi; Metteniusa cundinamarcensis; Metteniusa edulis; Metteniusa huilensis; Metteniusa nucifera; Metteniusa santanderensis; Metteniusa tessmanniana

Synonyms
- Aveledoa Pittier

= Metteniusa =

Genus of flowering plants

Metteniusa is a genus of flowering plants in the family Metteniusaceae. It was named by Hermann Karsten in 1860 for the German botanist Georg Heinrich Mettenius. It has seven species. The type species is Metteniusa edulis.. "Metteniusaceae" was proposed by Adalbert Schnizlein and validated by Hermann Karsten in 1860.. The family is now placed in its own order, Metteniusales.
