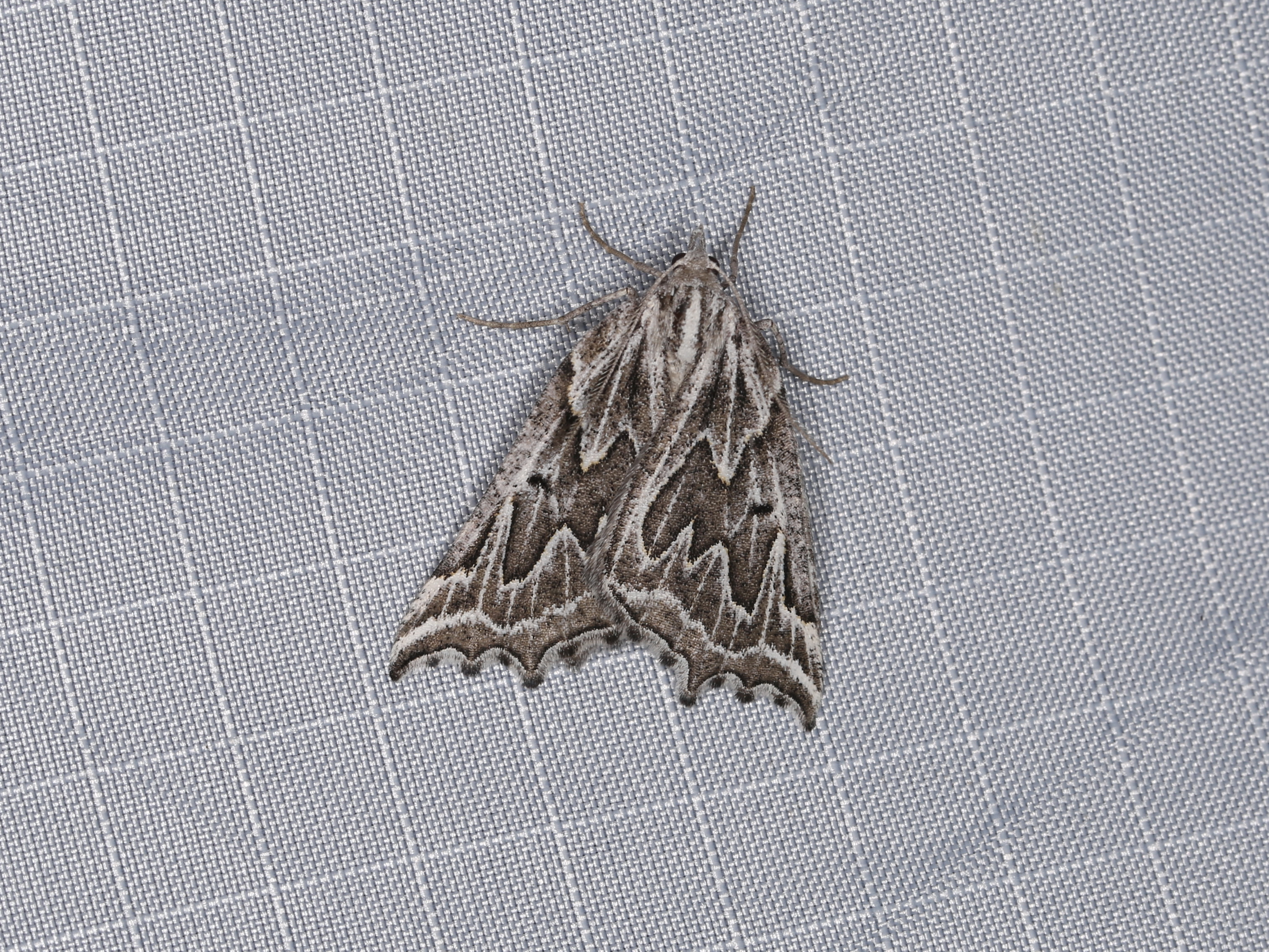

Scientific classification
- Kingdom: Animalia
- Phylum: Arthropoda
- Clade: Pancrustacea
- Class: Insecta
- Order: Lepidoptera
- Family: Geometridae
- Genus: Plataea
- Species: P. personaria

Binomial name
- Plataea personaria (H. Edwards, 1881)

= Plataea personaria =

Species of moth

Plataea personaria is a species of geometrid moth in the family Geometridae. It was first described by Henry Edwards in 1881 and is found in North America.
