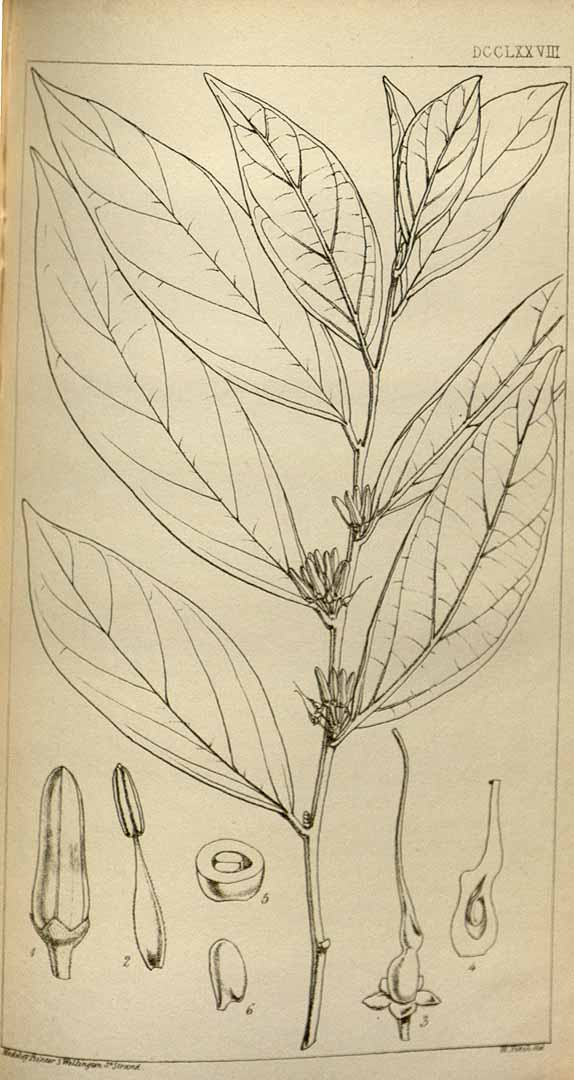
- Rhaphiostylis beninensis

Scientific classification
- Kingdom: Plantae
- Clade: Tracheophytes
- Clade: Angiosperms
- Clade: Eudicots
- Clade: Asterids
- Order: Metteniusales
- Family: Metteniusaceae
- Genus: Rhaphiostylis; Planch. ex Benth.

= Rhaphiostylis =

Genus of plants

Rhaphiostylis is a genus of flowering plants belonging to the family Metteniusaceae.

Its native range is Tropical Africa, Madagascar.

Species:

- Rhaphiostylis beninensis (Hook.f. ex Planch.) Planch. ex Benth.
- Rhaphiostylis cordifolia Hutch. & Dalziel
- Rhaphiostylis elegans Engl.
- Rhaphiostylis ferruginea Engl.
- Rhaphiostylis fusca (Pierre) Pierre
- Rhaphiostylis minima Jongkind
- Rhaphiostylis ovatifolia Engl. ex Sleumer
- Rhaphiostylis parvifolia (S.Moore) Exell
- Rhaphiostylis poggei Engl.
- Rhaphiostylis preussii Engl.
- Rhaphiostylis subsessilifolia Engl.
