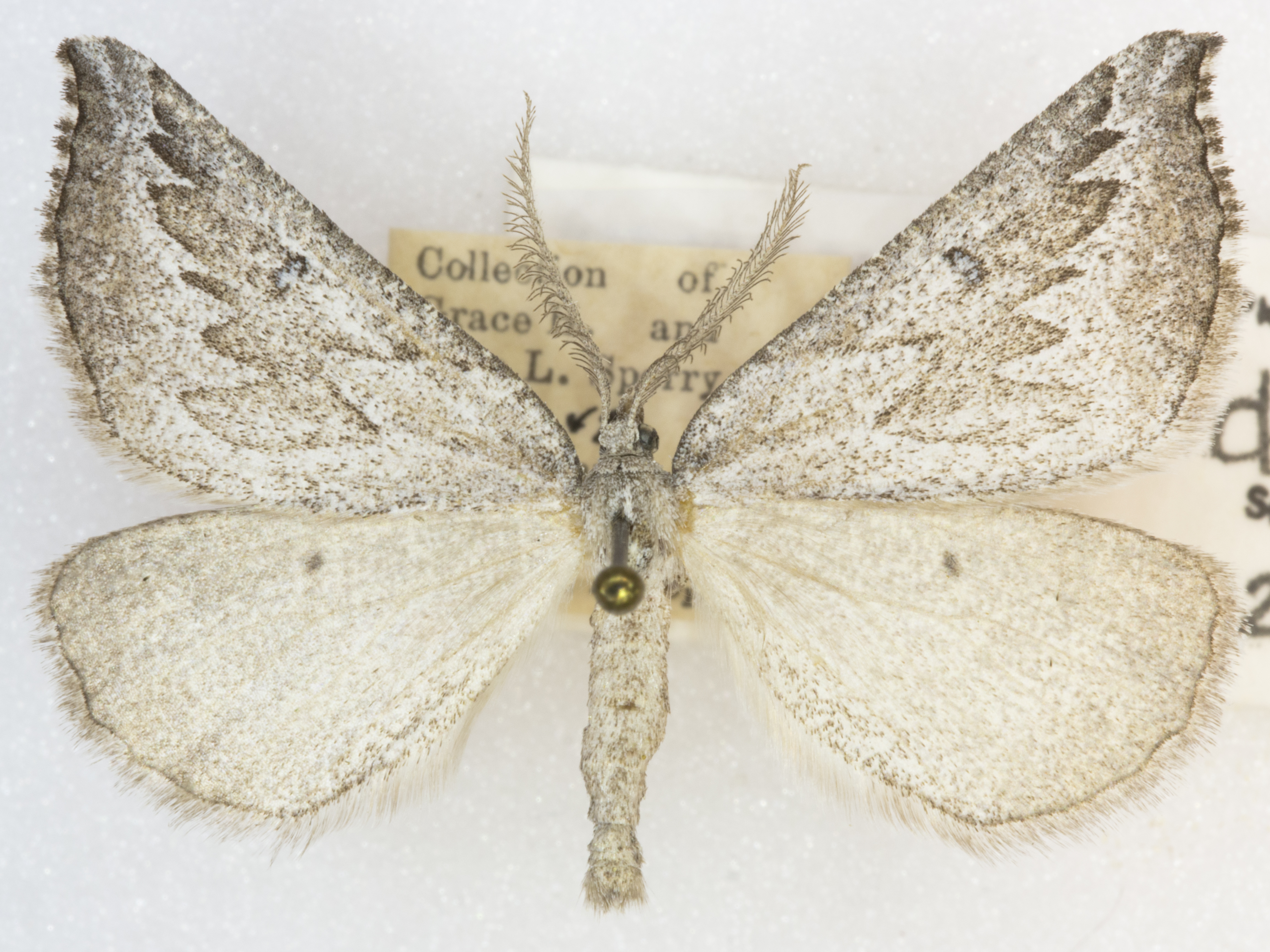

Scientific classification
- Kingdom: Animalia
- Phylum: Arthropoda
- Clade: Pancrustacea
- Class: Insecta
- Order: Lepidoptera
- Family: Geometridae
- Tribe: Ourapterygini
- Genus: Plataea
- Species: P. diva

Binomial name
- Plataea diva Hulst, 1896

= Plataea diva =

Species of moth

Plataea diva is a species of moth in the family Geometridae. It is found in North America.
