= Dendrobangia =

Scientific classification
- Kingdom: Plantae
- Clade: Tracheophytes
- Clade: Angiosperms
- Clade: Eudicots
- Clade: Asterids
- Order: Metteniusales
- Family: Metteniusaceae
- Genus: Dendrobangia; Rusby

Synonyms
- Clavapetalum Pulle; Asterolepidion Ducke

Genus of plants

Dendrobangia is a genus of flowering plants in the family Metteniusaceae. It was formerly placed in the family Cardiopteridaceae. It was described as a genus in 1896.

Dendrobangia is native to South America and Costa Rica.

species

1. Dendrobangia boliviana Rusby – Costa Rica, Colombia, Venezuela, Ecuador, Peru, Bolivia, Brazil
2. Dendrobangia multinervia Ducke – Colombia, Ecuador, Peru, NW Brazil
