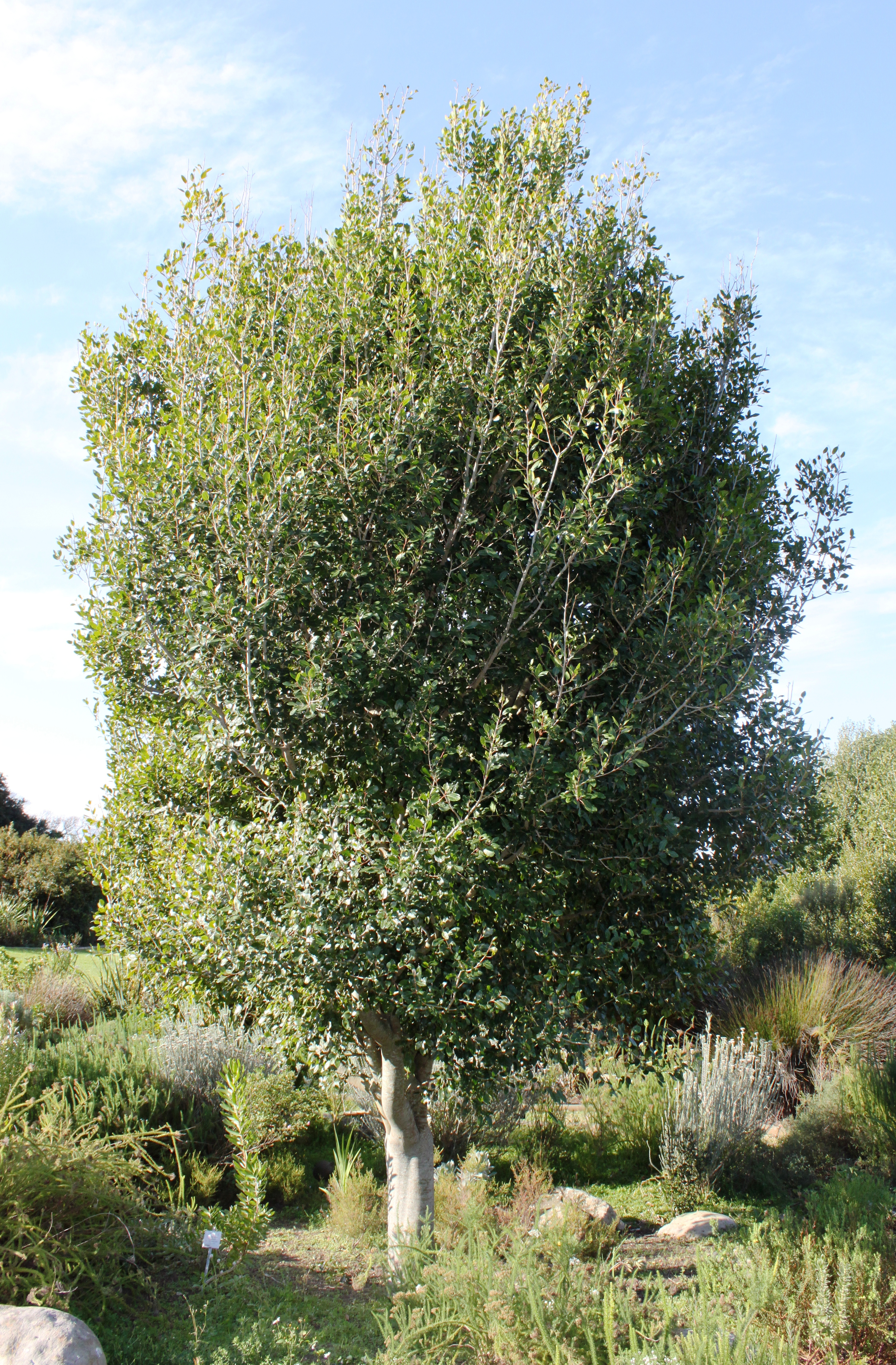
- Apodytes dimidiata

Scientific classification
- Kingdom: Plantae
- Clade: Tracheophytes
- Clade: Angiosperms
- Clade: Eudicots
- Clade: Asterids
- Order: Metteniusales
- Family: Metteniusaceae
- Genus: Apodytes; E.Mey. ex Arn. (1840)

Species
- See text

= Apodytes =

Genus of flowering plants

Apodytes is a genus of flowering plants in the family Metteniusaceae. It was formerly either unplaced as to family or placed in the family Icacinaceae. It consists of about 8 species of evergreen trees, from tropical northeastern Australia, New Caledonia, Africa and Asia. The exact number of species has been revised from 3 to 8, according to The Plant List.

== Description ==
All of the species have simple, smooth-edged, leathery leaves and much-branched panicles of small white flowers with recurving petals and conspicuous stamens. The fruits are small drupes with a fleshly appendage on one side attached to the fruit, termed a pseudoaril.
The African species (Apodytes dimidiata) is grown for its attractive display of white blossom and red and black fruit, as well as for shade, screening and hedges. It is also grown in southern Africa for ornament and timber, and a bark preparation is used to drive out intestinal parasites.

== Cultivation ==
It adapts readily to gardens in warm-temperate to tropical climates, though growth is not particularly fast and it can be kept to large shrub size. A deep fertile soil suits it best but it will grow in poorer soils. Propagate from fresh seed.

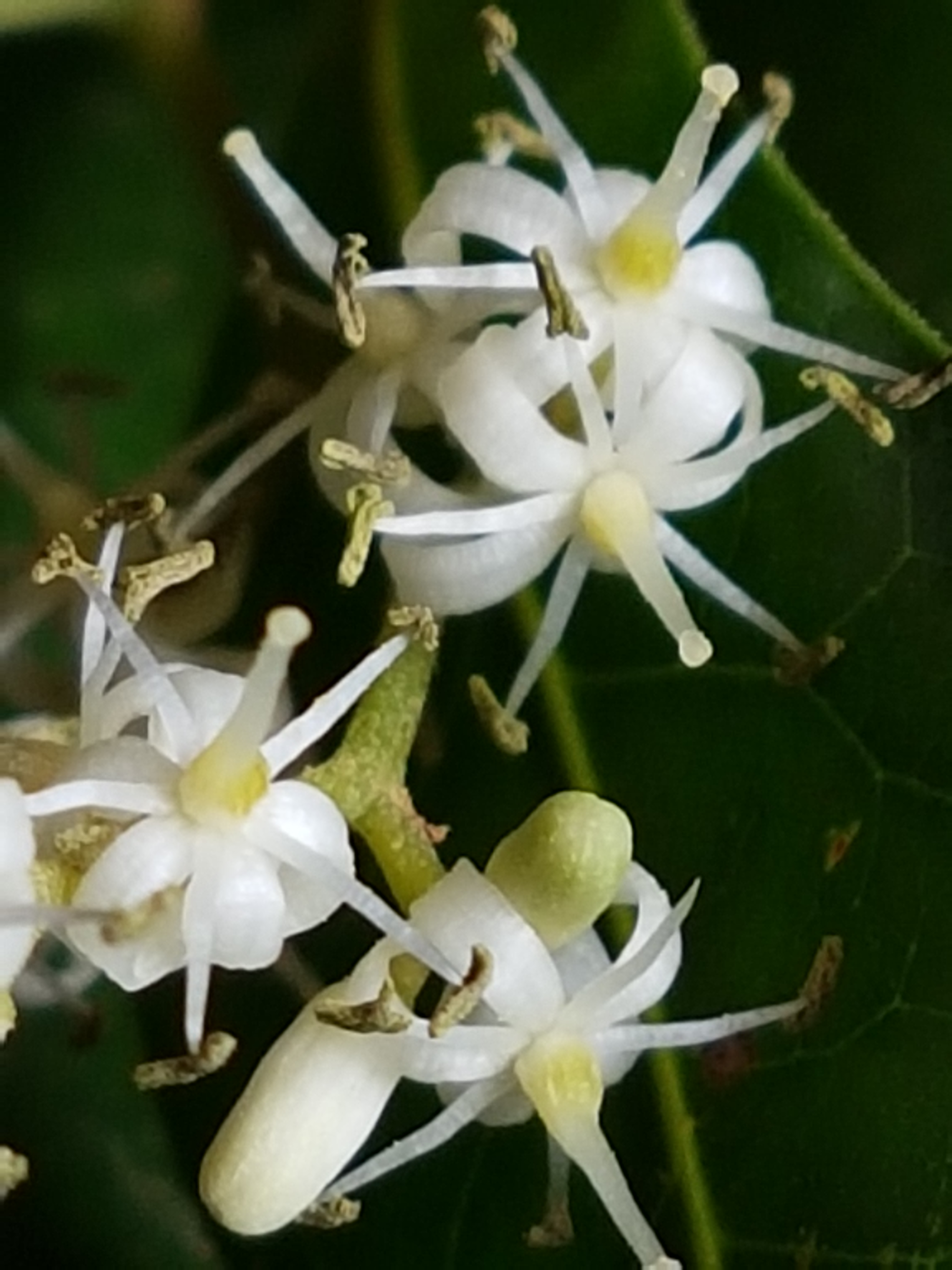
Apodytes dimidiata

== Species ==
The original classification included only 3 species, but recently the genus was revised to include 8 species.

- Apodytes abbottii Potg. & A.E.van Wyk
- Apodytes bebile Labat, R.Rabev. & El-Achkar
- Apodytes brachystylis F.Muell.
- Apodytes clusiifolia (Baill.) Villiers
- Apodytes dimidiata E.Mey. ex Arn.
- Apodytes geldenhuysii A.E.van Wyk & Potgieter
- Apodytes grandifolia (Miers) Benth. & Hook.f. ex B.D.Jacks.
- Apodytes thouvenotii Danguy
