= Plataea blanchardaria =

Scientific classification
- Domain: Eukaryota
- Kingdom: Animalia
- Phylum: Arthropoda
- Class: Insecta
- Order: Lepidoptera
- Family: Geometridae
- Tribe: Ourapterygini
- Genus: Plataea
- Species: P. blanchardaria

Binomial name
- Plataea blanchardaria Knudson, 1986

Species of moth

Plataea blanchardaria is a species of geometrid moth in the family Geometridae. It is found in North America.

The MONA or Hodges number for Plataea blanchardaria is 6921.1.
