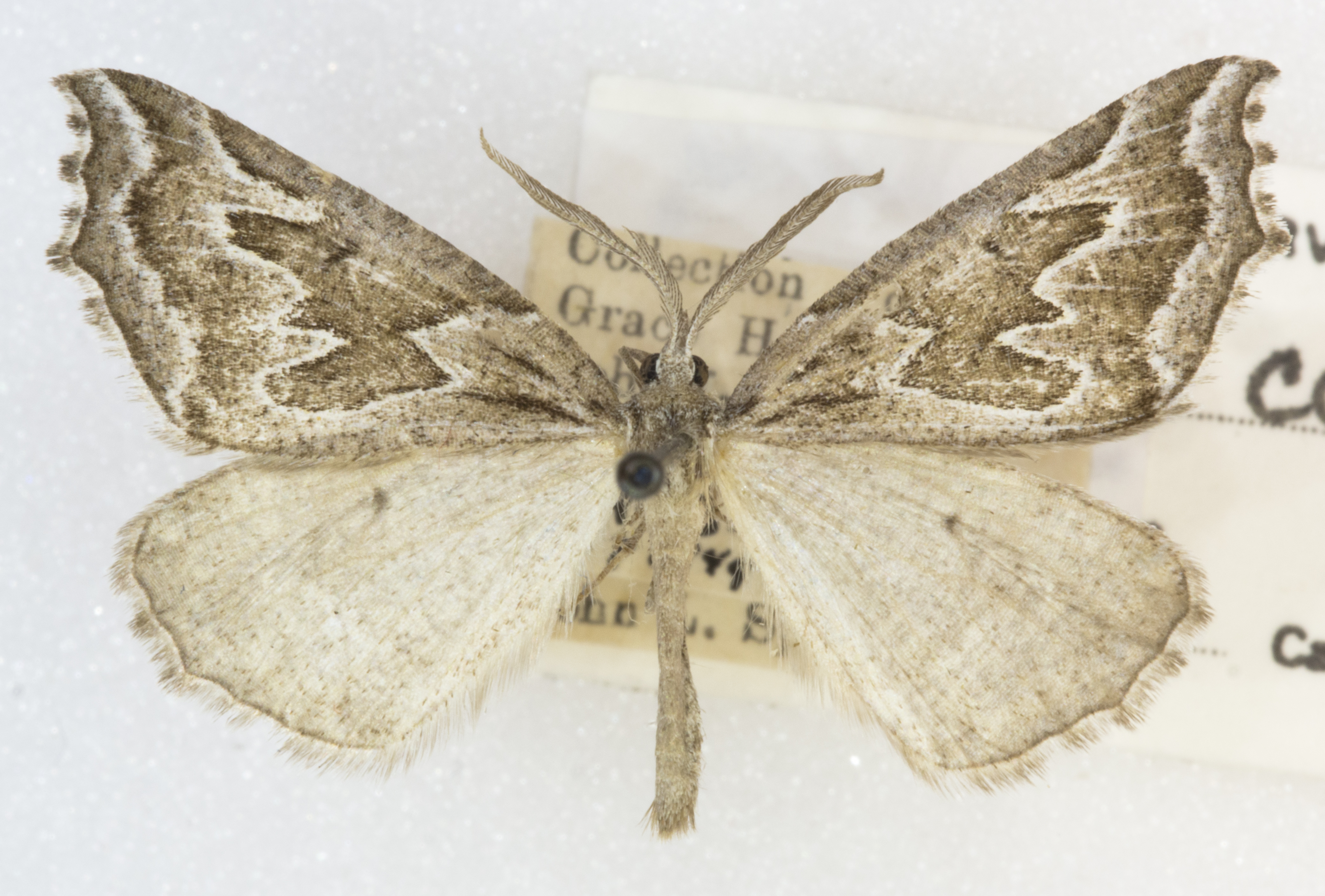

Scientific classification
- Domain: Eukaryota
- Kingdom: Animalia
- Phylum: Arthropoda
- Class: Insecta
- Order: Lepidoptera
- Family: Geometridae
- Genus: Plataea
- Species: P. californiaria

Binomial name
- Plataea californiaria Herrich-Schäffer, 1856

= Plataea californiaria =

Species of moth

Plataea californiaria is a species of geometrid moth in the family Geometridae. It was described by Gottlieb August Wilhelm Herrich-Schäffer in 1856 and is found in North America.

The MONA or Hodges number for Plataea californiaria is 6924.
