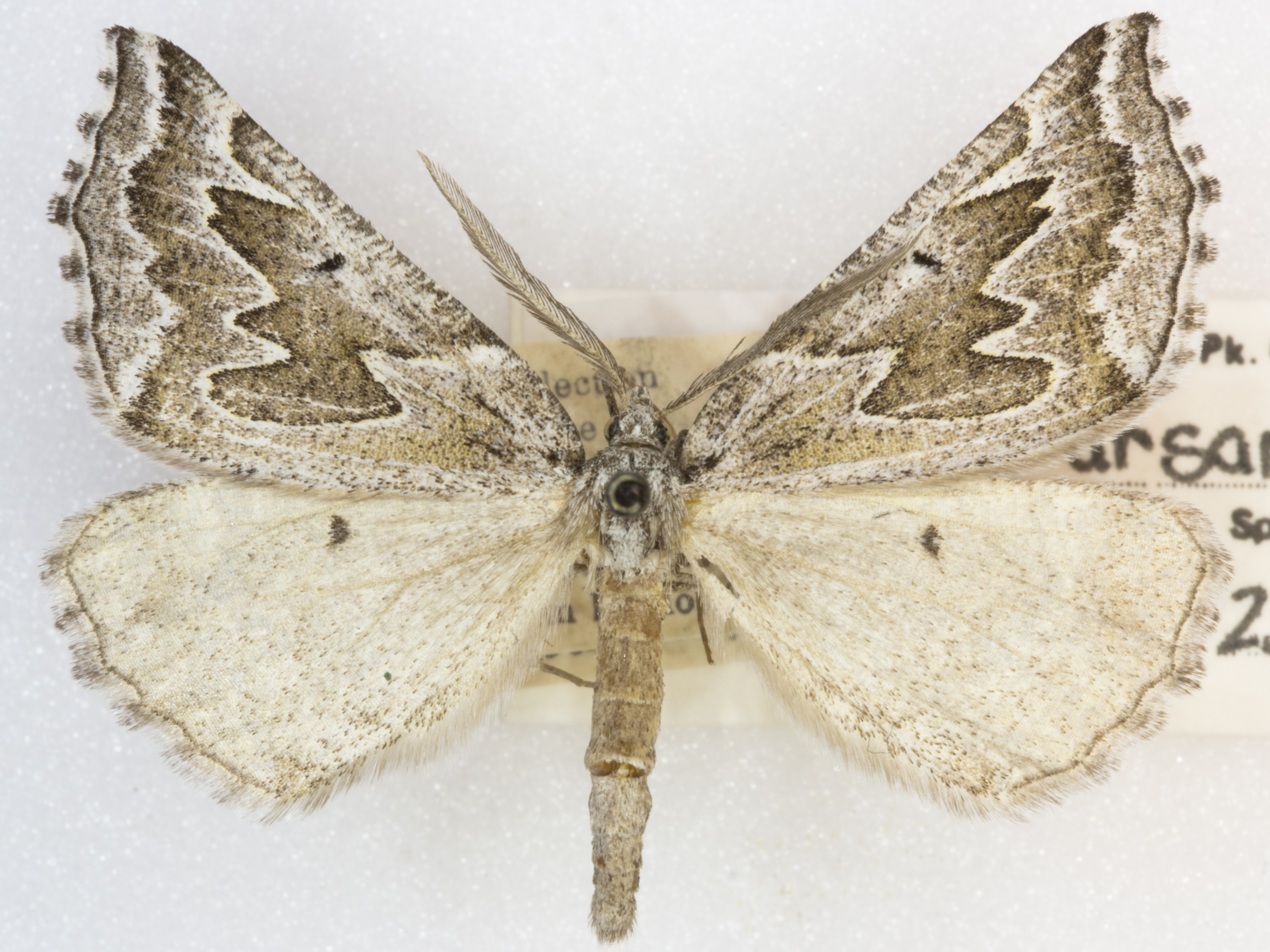

Scientific classification
- Kingdom: Animalia
- Phylum: Arthropoda
- Clade: Pancrustacea
- Class: Insecta
- Order: Lepidoptera
- Family: Geometridae
- Genus: Plataea
- Species: P. ursaria

Binomial name
- Plataea ursaria Cassino & Swett, 1922

= Plataea ursaria =

Species of moth

Plataea ursaria is a species of geometrid moth in the family Geometridae. It is found in North America.
