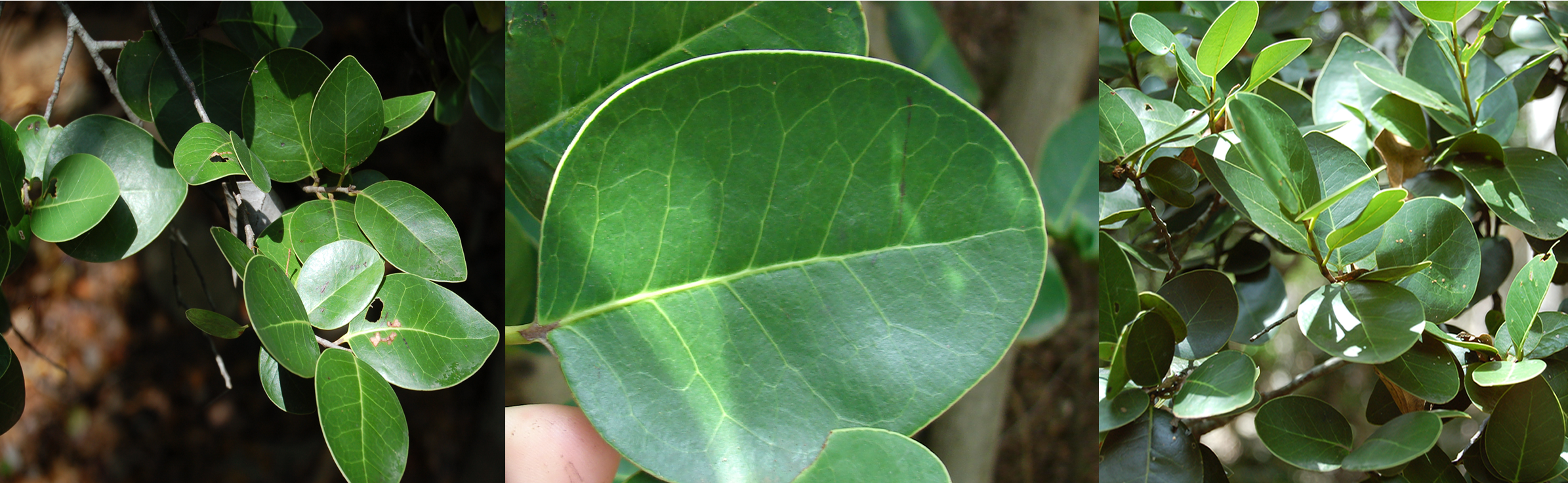
- Ottoschulzia rhodoxylon

Scientific classification
- Kingdom: Plantae
- Clade: Tracheophytes
- Clade: Angiosperms
- Clade: Eudicots
- Clade: Asterids
- Order: Metteniusales
- Family: Metteniusaceae
- Genus: Ottoschulzia; Urb.

= Ottoschulzia =

Genus of plants

Ottoschulzia is a genus of flowering plants belonging to the family Metteniusaceae.

== Taxonomy ==
The genus name of Ottoschulzia is in honour of Otto Eugen Schulz (1874–1936), a German botanist, born in Berlin. It was first described and published in Symb. Antill. Vol.7 on page 272 in 1912.

=== Species ===
According to Kew:

- Ottoschulzia cubensis (C.Wright ex Griseb.) Urb.
- Ottoschulzia domingensis Urb.
- Ottoschulzia pallida Lundell
- Ottoschulzia rhodoxylon (Urb.) Urb.

== Distribution ==
Its native range is from southeastern Mexico to Guatemala, and in the Greater Antilles (Cuba, the Dominican Republic, Haiti and Puerto Rico).
