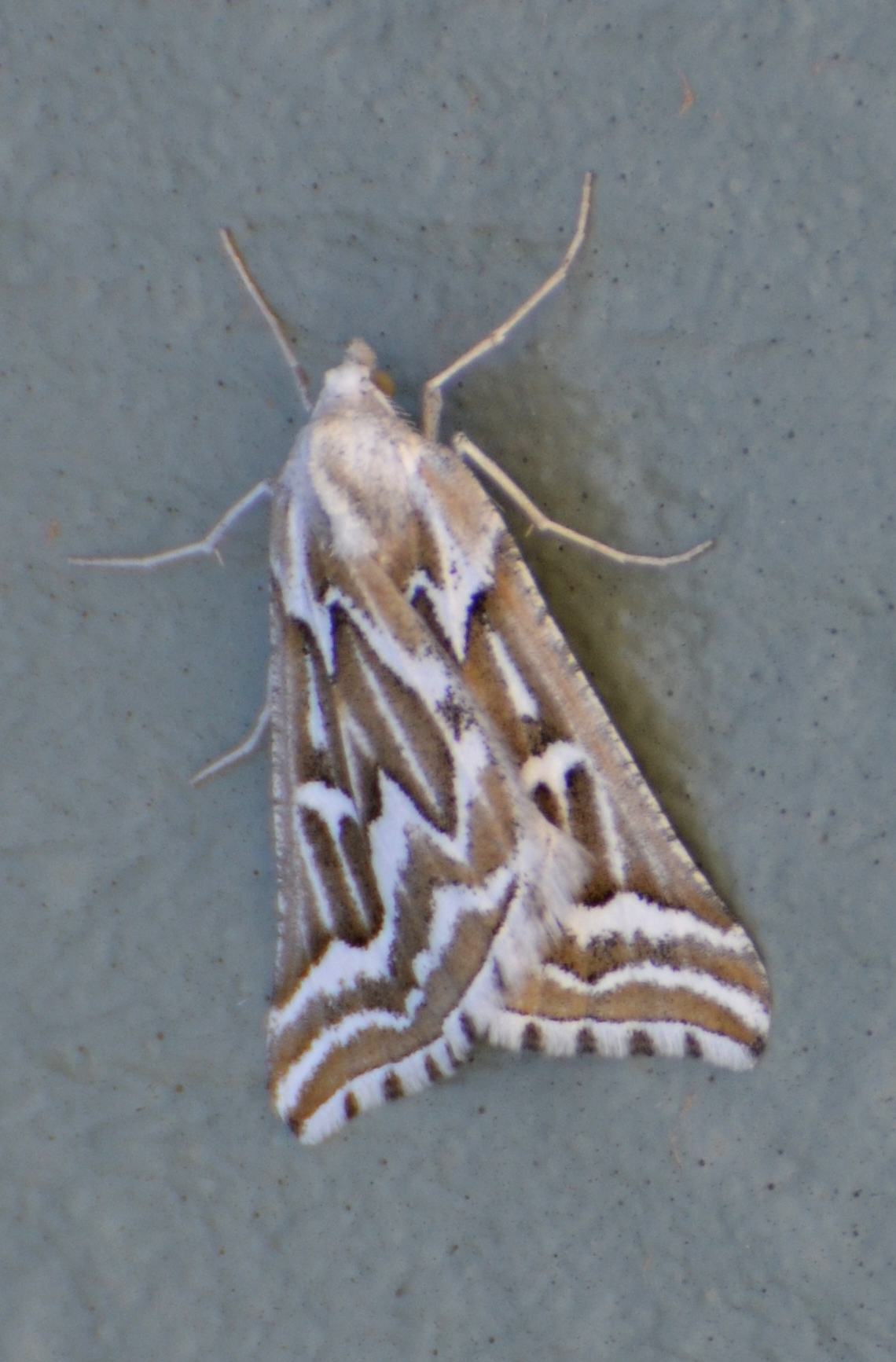
- Plataea trilinearia

Scientific classification
- Kingdom: Animalia
- Phylum: Arthropoda
- Clade: Pancrustacea
- Class: Insecta
- Order: Lepidoptera
- Family: Geometridae
- Subfamily: Ennominae
- Tribe: Ourapterygini
- Genus: Plataea; Herrich-Schäffer, 1855

Synonyms
- Gorytodes Guenée, 1857; Apicrena Pearsall, 1911

= Plataea (moth) =

Genus of moths

Plataea is a genus of geometrid moths in the family Geometridae. There are about 11 described species in Plataea.

== Species ==
These 11 species belong to the genus Plataea:

- Plataea aristidesi Rindge, 1976^{c g}
- Plataea blanchardaria Knudson, 1986^{i g b}
- Plataea calcaria (Pearsall, 1911)^{i c g b}
- Plataea californiaria Herrich-Schäffer, 1856^{i c g b}
- Plataea diva Hulst, 1896^{i c g b}
- Plataea mexicana Druce, 1899^{c g}
- Plataea pausaniasi Rindge, 1976^{c g}
- Plataea personaria (H. Edwards, 1881)^{i c g b}
- Plataea polychroma Ferris & McFarland, 2010^{i g b}
- Plataea trilinearia (Packard, 1873)^{i c g b} (sagebrush girdle)
- Plataea ursaria Cassino & Swett, 1922^{i c g b}

Data sources: i = ITIS, c = Catalogue of Life, g = GBIF, b = Bugguide.net
