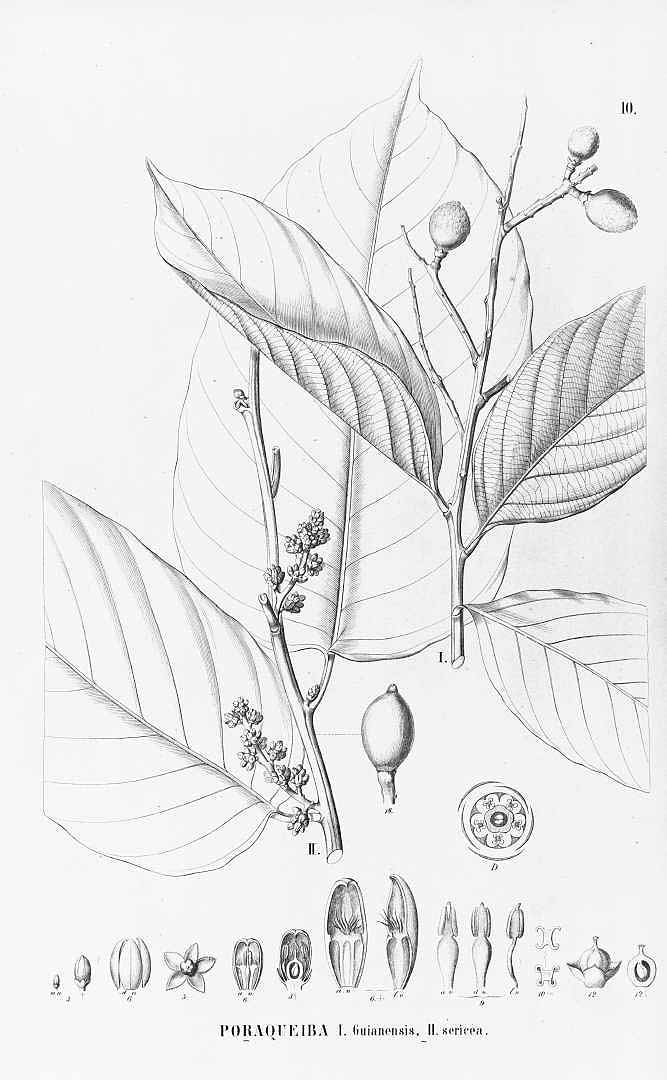
- Branchlets of Poraqueiba sericea (left) and Poraqueiba guianensis (right).

Scientific classification
- Kingdom: Plantae
- Clade: Tracheophytes
- Clade: Angiosperms
- Clade: Eudicots
- Clade: Asterids
- Order: Metteniusales
- Family: Metteniusaceae
- Genus: Poraqueiba; Aubl.

Species
- Poraqueiba guianensis; Poraqueiba paraensis; Poraqueiba sericea

= Poraqueiba =

Genus of flowering plants

Poraqueiba is a genus of flowering plants in the family Metteniusaceae. It comprises 3 species native to Panama and South America.
