= Platystigma (plant) =

Scientific classification
- Kingdom: Plantae
- Clade: Tracheophytes
- Clade: Angiosperms
- Clade: Eudicots
- Order: Ranunculales
- Family: Papaveraceae
- Genus: Platystigma; Benth.

Genus of flowering plants

Platystigma is a genus of flowering plants belonging to the family Papaveraceae.

Its native range is California.

Species:

- Platystigma lineare Benth.
