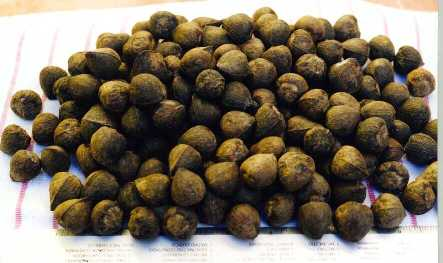
- Roasted seeds of Oecopetalum mexicanum, here given as cacaté

Scientific classification
- Kingdom: Plantae
- Clade: Tracheophytes
- Clade: Angiosperms
- Clade: Eudicots
- Clade: Asterids
- Order: Metteniusales
- Family: Metteniusaceae
- Genus: Oecopetalum; Greenm. & C.H.Thomps.

Species
- See text

= Oecopetalum =

Genus of Metteniusaceae plants

Oecopetalum is a genus of flowering plants in the family Metteniusaceae, native to Mexico and Central America. They are trees with edible fruits, and prefer to grow in the transition zone between cloud forests and tropical forests. Locals collect, roast, consume and occasionally sell the fruit, which is bitter enough to give Oecopetalum mexicanum the name cachichín in the Totonaca language, meaning "bitter fruit".

== Species ==
Currently accepted species include:

- Oecopetalum greenmanii Standl. & Steyerm.
- Oecopetalum mexicanum Greenm. & C.H.Thomps.
