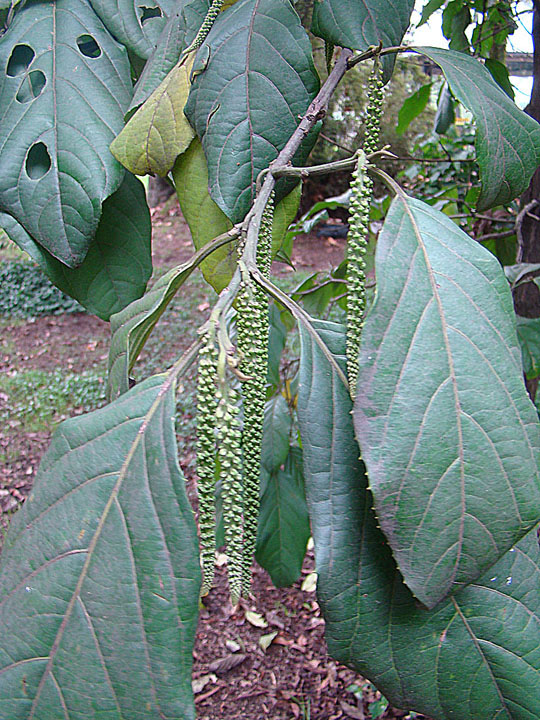
- Calatola columbiana

Scientific classification
- Kingdom: Plantae
- Clade: Tracheophytes
- Clade: Angiosperms
- Clade: Eudicots
- Clade: Asterids
- Order: Metteniusales
- Family: Metteniusaceae
- Genus: Calatola

= Calatola =

Genus of flowering plants

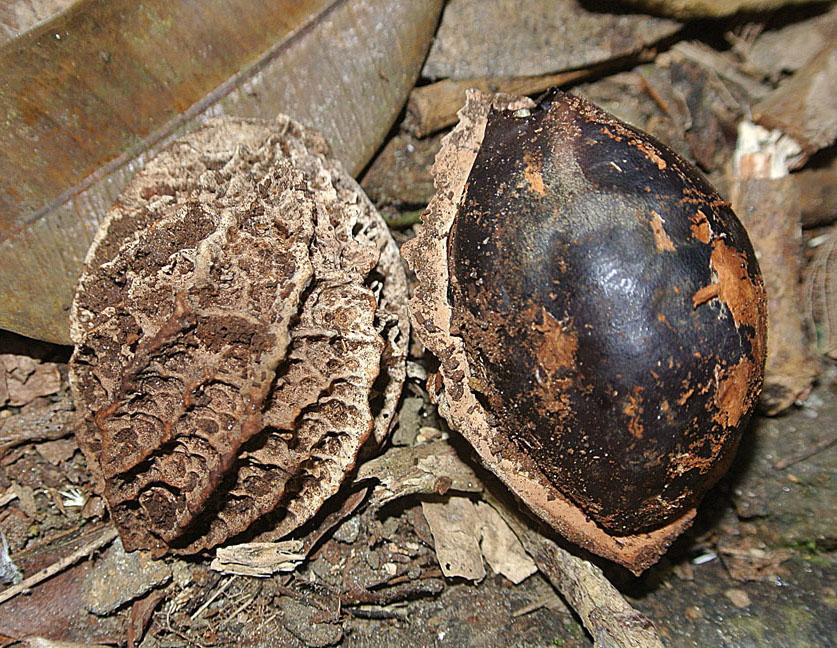
Calatola columbiana seeds

Calatola is a genus of flowering plants in the family Metteniusaceae. It was formerly placed in the family Icacinaceae. Its range is from Mexico to Peru. There are nine species. The type species is Calatola mollis.

Calatola columbiana - endemic to Colombia.

Calatola costaricensis - S. Mexico to Peru

Calatola laevigata - Mexico, Belize to Guatemala, El Salvador

Calatola microcarpa - Peru

Calatola mollis - Puebla to Guatemala

Calatola pastazana - Ecuador

Calatola sanquininensis - Colombia

Calatola uxpanapensis - Veracruz to Belize

Calatola venezuelana - Venezuela, Colombia, Ecuador, Peru
