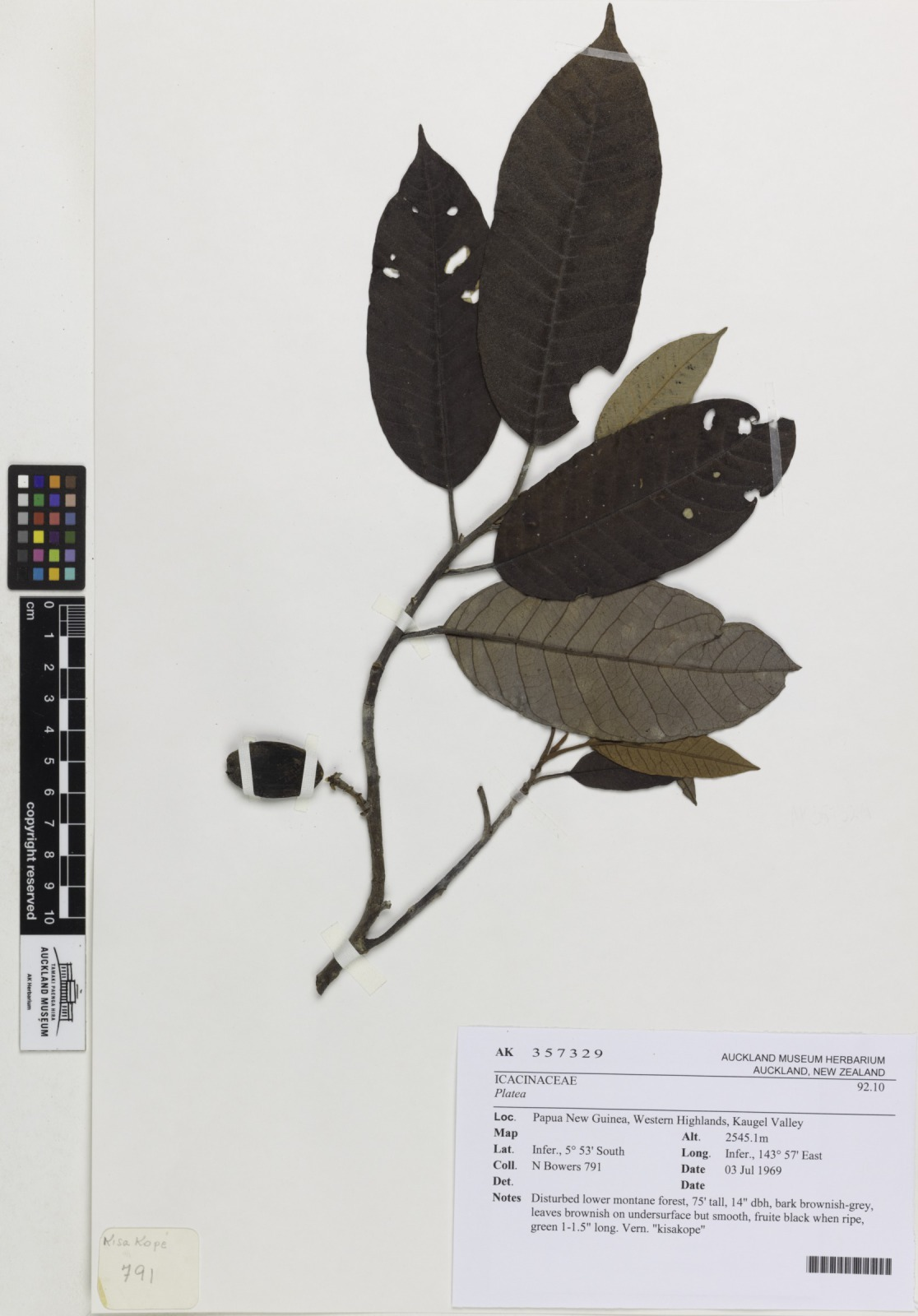

Scientific classification
- Kingdom: Plantae
- Clade: Tracheophytes
- Clade: Angiosperms
- Clade: Eudicots
- Clade: Asterids
- Clade: Lamiids
- Order: Metteniusales
- Family: Metteniusaceae
- Genus: Platea; Blume

Type species
- Platea excelsa Blume

= Platea (plant) =

Genus of plants

Platea, known as 肖榄属 (xiao lan shu) in Mandarin, is a genus in the Metteniusaceae found in tropical and subtropical Asia. It is a small genus of mostly dioecious trees that grow in high-elevation forests.

== Description ==
Platea is a genus of predominantly dioecious trees with spirally arranged leathery leaves. Plants may grow up to 45 meters tall. The young shoots and branches are covered with stellate (star-shaped) trichomes or simple hairs. The staminate (male) flowers are arranged in panicles and the pistillate (female) flowers in racemes. The flowers are pentamerous (floral parts arranged in five), with female flowers lacking petals. The stigma is sessile and disc-shaped, and the ovaries are cylindrical. The fruits are cylindrical drupes that are blue-black when ripe with a woody endocarp.

== Taxonomy and naming ==
Platea was once placed in the Icacinaceae. After the Icacinaceae were split into four smaller families, Platea was transferred to the Metteniusaceae. As of February 2023, it consists of 8 accepted species:

- Platea bullata Sleumer
- Platea excelsa Blume
- Platea hongiaoensis Tagane
- Platea kachinensis Y.H.Tan & H.B.Ding
- Platea latifolia Blume
- Platea malayana Utteridge
- Platea parvifolia Merr. & Chun
- Platea sclerophylla Sleumer
