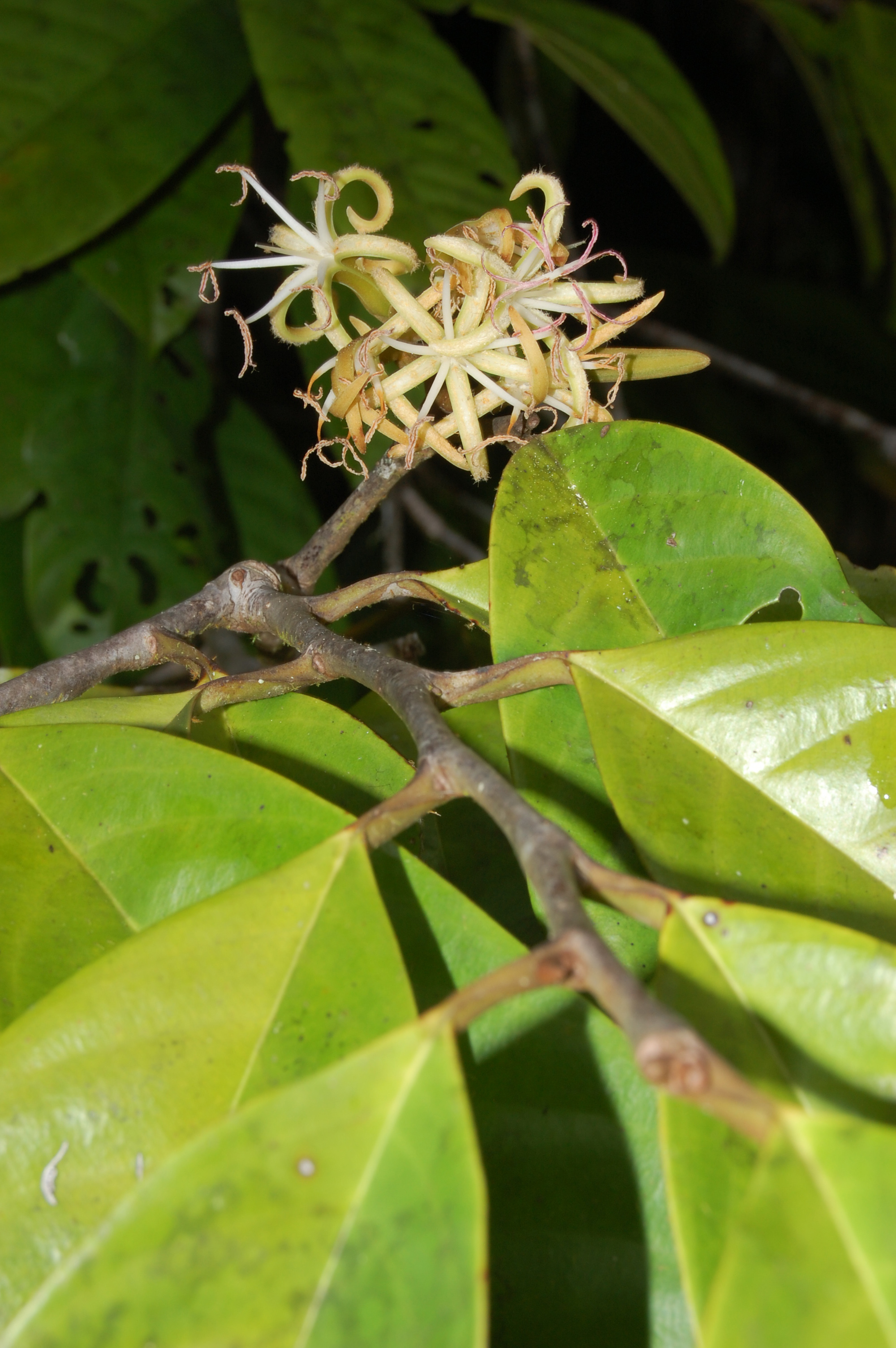
- Metteniusa tessmanniana

Scientific classification
- Kingdom: Plantae
- Clade: Tracheophytes
- Clade: Angiosperms
- Clade: Eudicots
- Clade: Asterids
- Order: Metteniusales; Takht.
- Family: Metteniusaceae; H.Karst. ex Schnizl.

Genera
- See text.

= Metteniusaceae =

Family of trees

Metteniusaceae are a family of flowering plants, the only family in the order Metteniusales. It consists of about 10 genera and 50 species of trees, shrubs, and lianas, primarily of the tropics. The family was formerly restricted to just Metteniusa, but it is now expanded with a number of genera that were formerly placed in the widely polyphyletic Icacinaceae.

== Genera ==
As of June 2016, the Angiosperm Phylogeny Website accepts 11 genera:

- Apodytes - c. 6 species
- Calatola - 7 species
- Dendrobangia - 3 species
- Emmotum - c. 10 species
- Metteniusa - 7 species
- Oecopetalum - 3 species
- Ottoschulzia - 3 species
- Pittosporopsis
- Platea - 8 species
- Poraqueiba - 3 species
- Rhaphiostylis - c. 10 species
