= S. juncea =

S. juncea may refer to:

- Solidago juncea, a perennial plant
- Sowerbaea juncea, a perennial herb
- Stelis juncea, an epiphytic orchid
- Strelitzia juncea, a monocotyledonous plant
