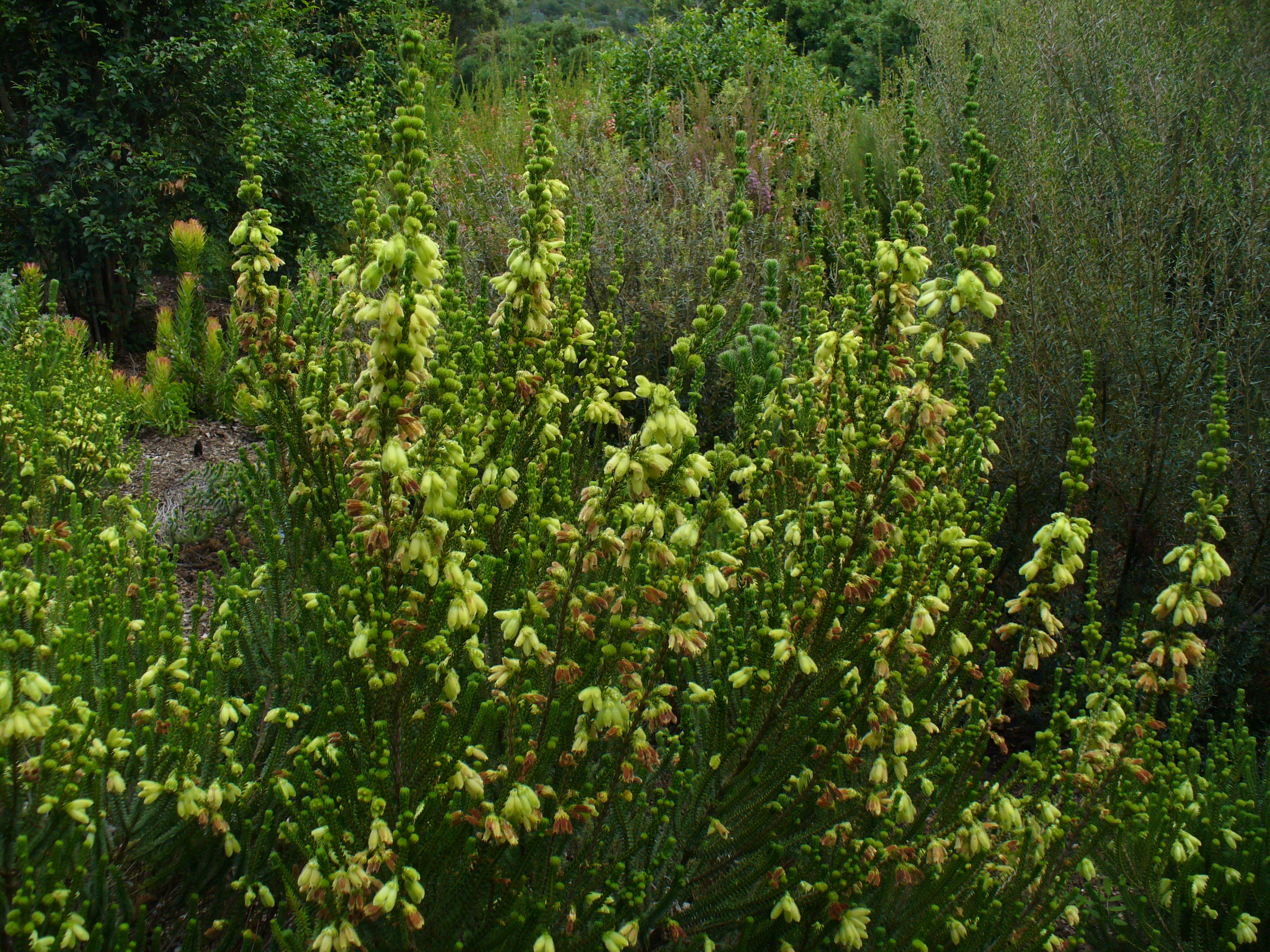
- In cultivation in the Kirstenbosch National Botanical Garden

Scientific classification
- Kingdom: Plantae
- Clade: Tracheophytes
- Clade: Angiosperms
- Clade: Eudicots
- Clade: Asterids
- Order: Ericales
- Family: Ericaceae
- Genus: Erica
- Species: E. sparrmanni

Binomial name
- Erica sparrmanni L.f.

Synonyms
- Callista armata G.Don; Dasyanthes sparrmanni (L.f.) D.Don; Erica armata Spreng.; Erica aspera Andrews; Erica hystriciflora Salisb.; Ericoides sparrmanni (L.f.) Kuntze

= Erica sparrmanni =

Species of flowering plant

Erica sparrmanni is a species of flowering plant belonging to the genus Erica. The species is endemic to the Cape Provinces. The specific epithet has subsequently been spelt in various ways, but the original description by Carl Linnaeus the Younger used sparrmanni. The International Plant Names Index notes that this is based on the Latinized name "Sparrmannus".

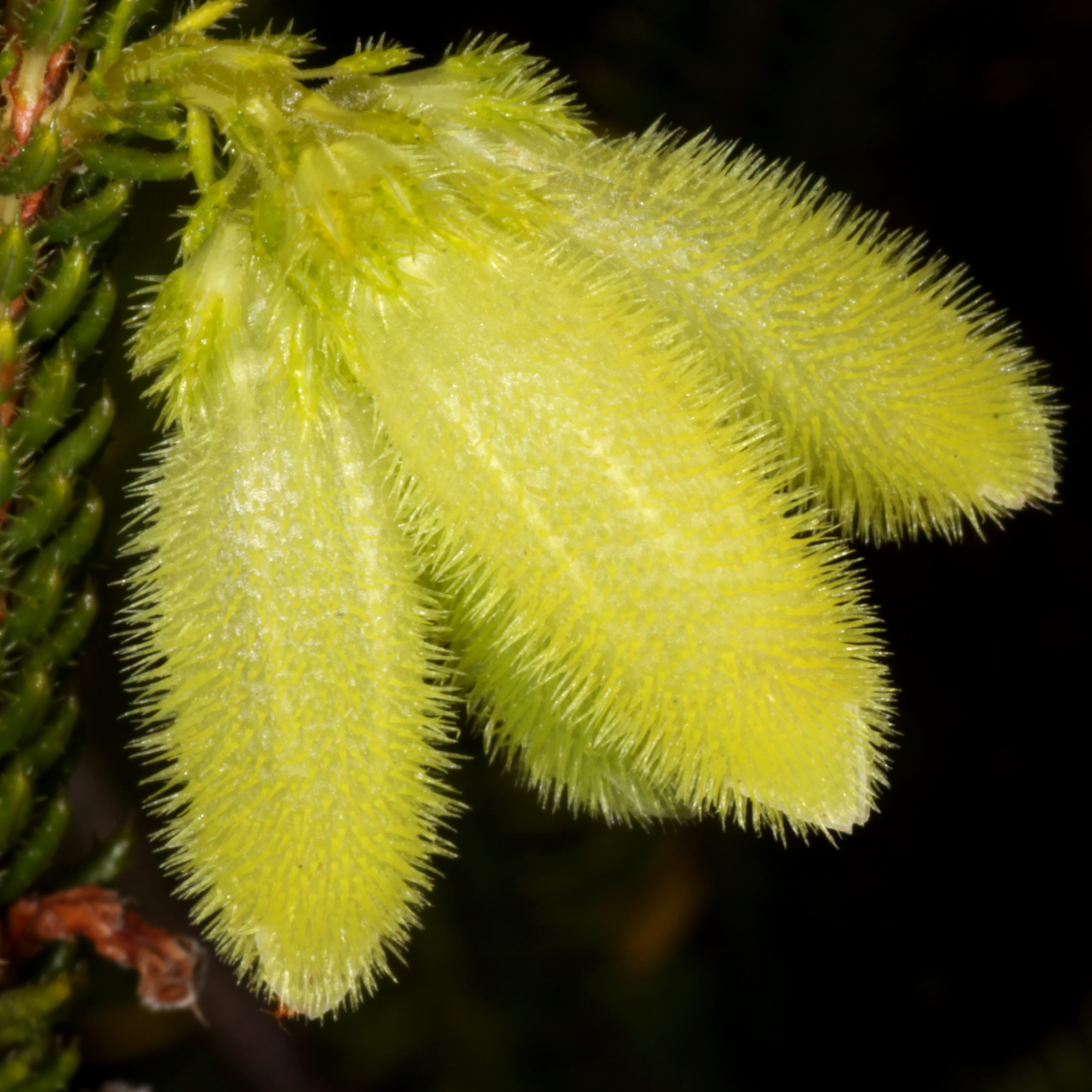
Flowers
