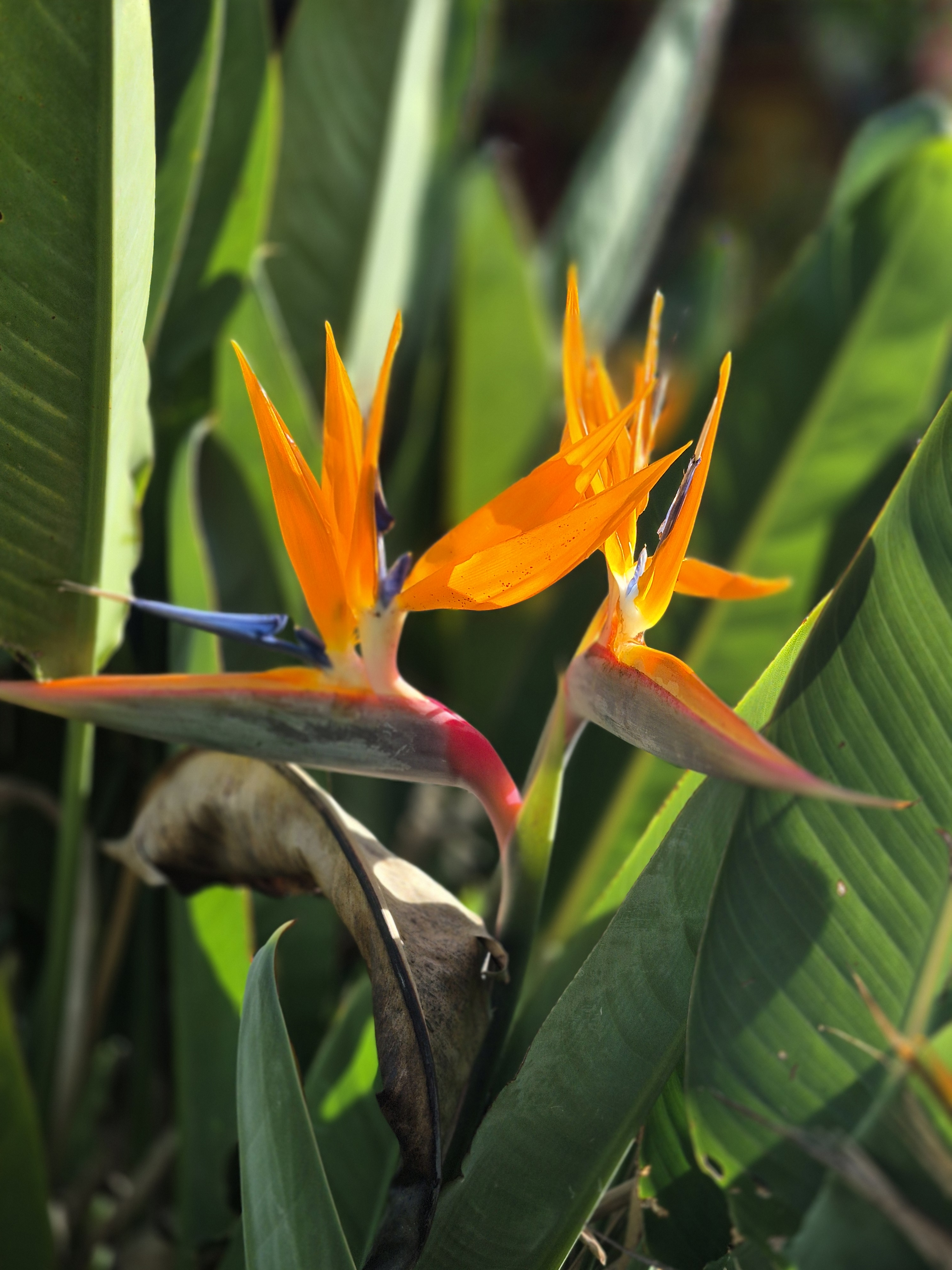
- Flowers in Brazil

Scientific classification
- Kingdom: Plantae
- Clade: Tracheophytes
- Clade: Angiosperms
- Clade: Monocots
- Clade: Commelinids
- Order: Zingiberales
- Family: Strelitziaceae
- Genus: Strelitzia
- Species: S. reginae

Binomial name
- Strelitzia reginae Banks

= Strelitzia reginae =

Species of flowering plant

Strelitzia reginae, commonly known as the crane flower, bird of paradise, or isigude in Nguni, is a species of flowering plant native to the Cape Provinces and KwaZulu-Natal in South Africa. An evergreen perennial, it is widely cultivated for its dramatic flowers. In temperate areas it is a popular houseplant.

== Taxonomy ==
Joseph Banks described the species in 1788. The specific epithet reginae means “of the queen”, and commemorates the British queen Charlotte of Mecklenburg-Strelitz. The common name “bird of paradise” is due to the resemblance of the open inflorescence to the display plumage and pose of certain species of bird-of-paradise, which bore the name first. The name "crane flower" is in comparison to the head and beak of a crowned crane.

A new subspecies was discovered growing alongside the Mzimvubu River in South Africa’s Eastern Cape in 2002. When wild-collected plants began to flower in the greenhouse at Kirstenbosch, they were noted to have white, rather than the typical blue inner petals. They also had a shorter stigma (10–15 millimetres (3/8–9/16 in) vs. 30 millimetres (1 3/16 in)) and subtle differences of the leaves. The new subspecies is called Strelitzia reginae subsp. mzimvubuensis.

Genetic analysis reveals Strelitzia juncea has been shown to be genetically nested within S. reginae. It is possibly a mutation that is in the process of speciating.

== Description ==
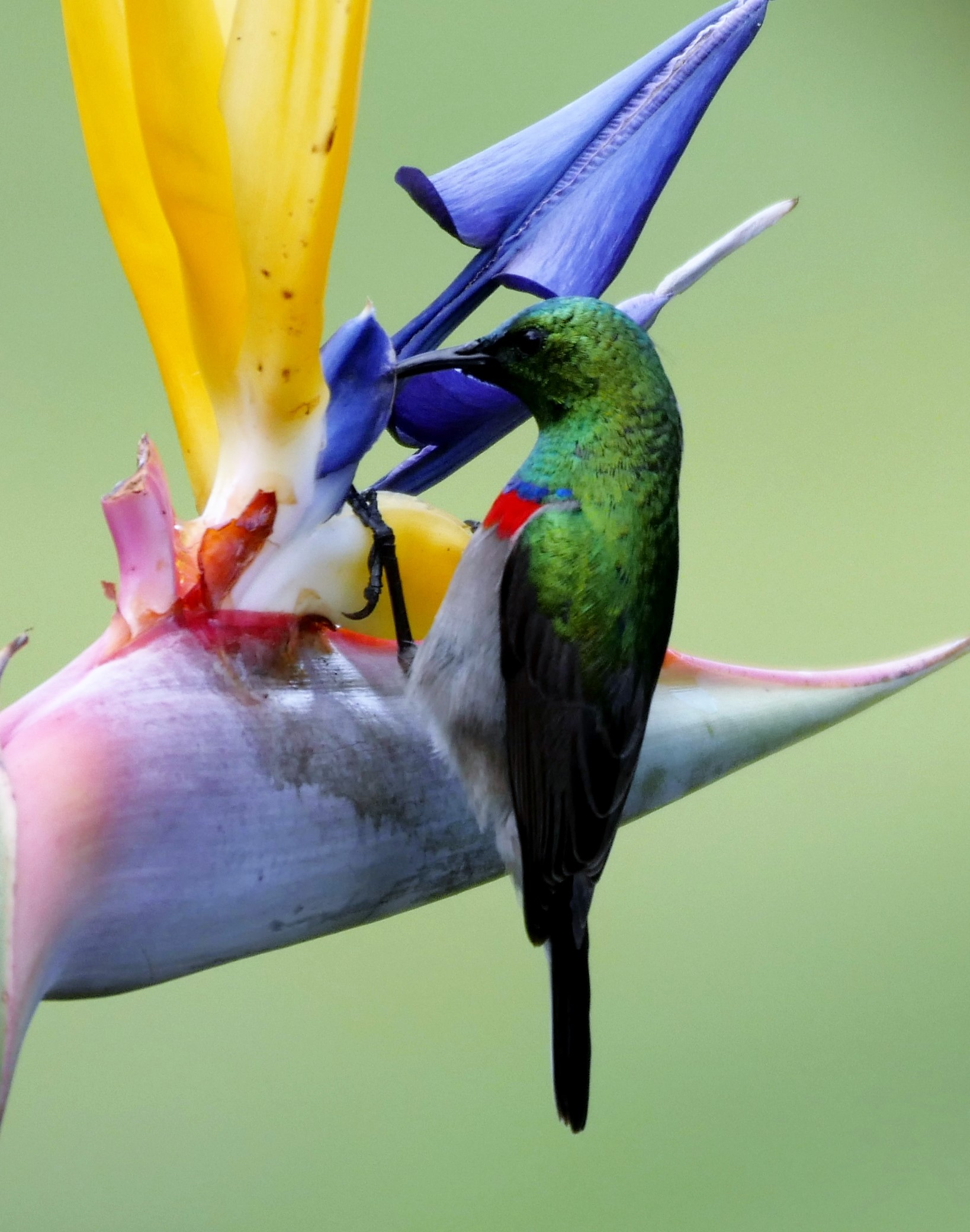
Southern double-collared sunbird feeding on nectar

The plant grows to 2 m (6 1/2 ft) tall, with large, strong leaves 25–70 cm (10–28 in) long and 10–30 cm (4–12 in) broad, produced on petioles up to 1 m (40 in) long. The leaves are evergreen and arranged in two ranks, making a fan-shaped crown. The flowers stand above the foliage at the tips of long stalks. The hard, beak-like sheath from which the flower emerges is termed the spathe. This is placed perpendicular to the stem, which gives it the appearance of a bird's head and beak; it makes a durable perch for holding the sunbirds which pollinate the flowers. The flowers, which emerge one at a time from the spathe, consist of three orange sepals and three purplish-blue or white petals. Two of the petals are joined together to form an arrow-like nectary. When the sunbirds sit to drink the nectar, the third petal opens to release the anther and cover their feet in pollen.

== Cultivation and uses ==
Strelitzia reginae is very popular as an ornamental plant. It was first introduced to Britain in 1773, when it was grown at the Royal Botanic Gardens, Kew. Since then, it has been widely introduced around the world, including the Americas and Australia, growing well in any area that is sunny and warm. In the United States, Florida and California are the main areas of cultivation, due to their warm climate. It is a common ornamental plant in Southern California, and has been chosen as the official flower of City of Los Angeles.

In areas with cold winters it is normally grown under glass, in a cool sunny position such as a greenhouse or conservatory, as it tolerates only light frosts and does not grow well in temperatures below 10 °C (50 °F). However, it may be placed outside during the summer months. It has gained the Royal Horticultural Society's Award of Garden Merit.

It is a low-maintenance plant that is easy to grow in the garden; it is fairly tolerant of soil conditions and needs little water once established. If cared for well, they will flower several times in a year. They will thrive in rich loamy soil, especially when they get plenty of water throughout the year. They do well in full sun to semi-shade and respond well to regular feeding with a controlled release fertiliser and compost. They are sensitive to cold and need to be sheltered from frost, as it can damage the flowers and leaves.

S. reginae is propagated by seed or division. Seedlings are slow-growing and will not bloom for three to five years, though it can exceptionally flower at two years. It flowers only when properly established and division of the plant may affect flowering patterns. The flowers are, however, quite long-lasting once they appear. Peak flowering is in the winter and early spring. There is a yellow-flowered cultivar of this plant known as ‘Mandela's Gold’.

== Allergenicity ==
Bird-of-paradise plants have an OPALS allergy scale rating of 1, and are considered "allergy-fighting"; they produce no airborne pollen.

== Gallery ==
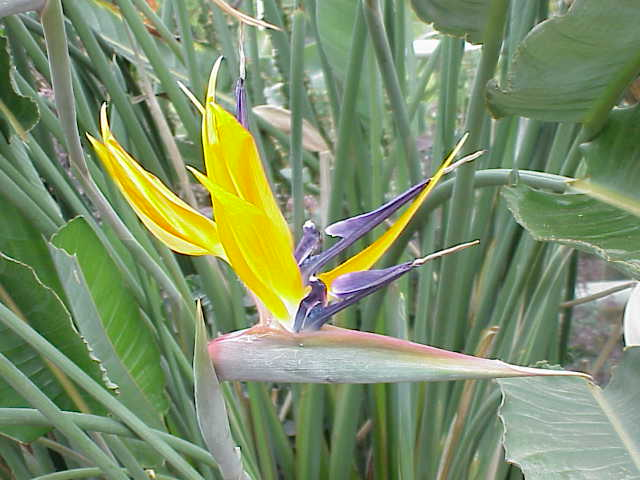
var. taki Hort

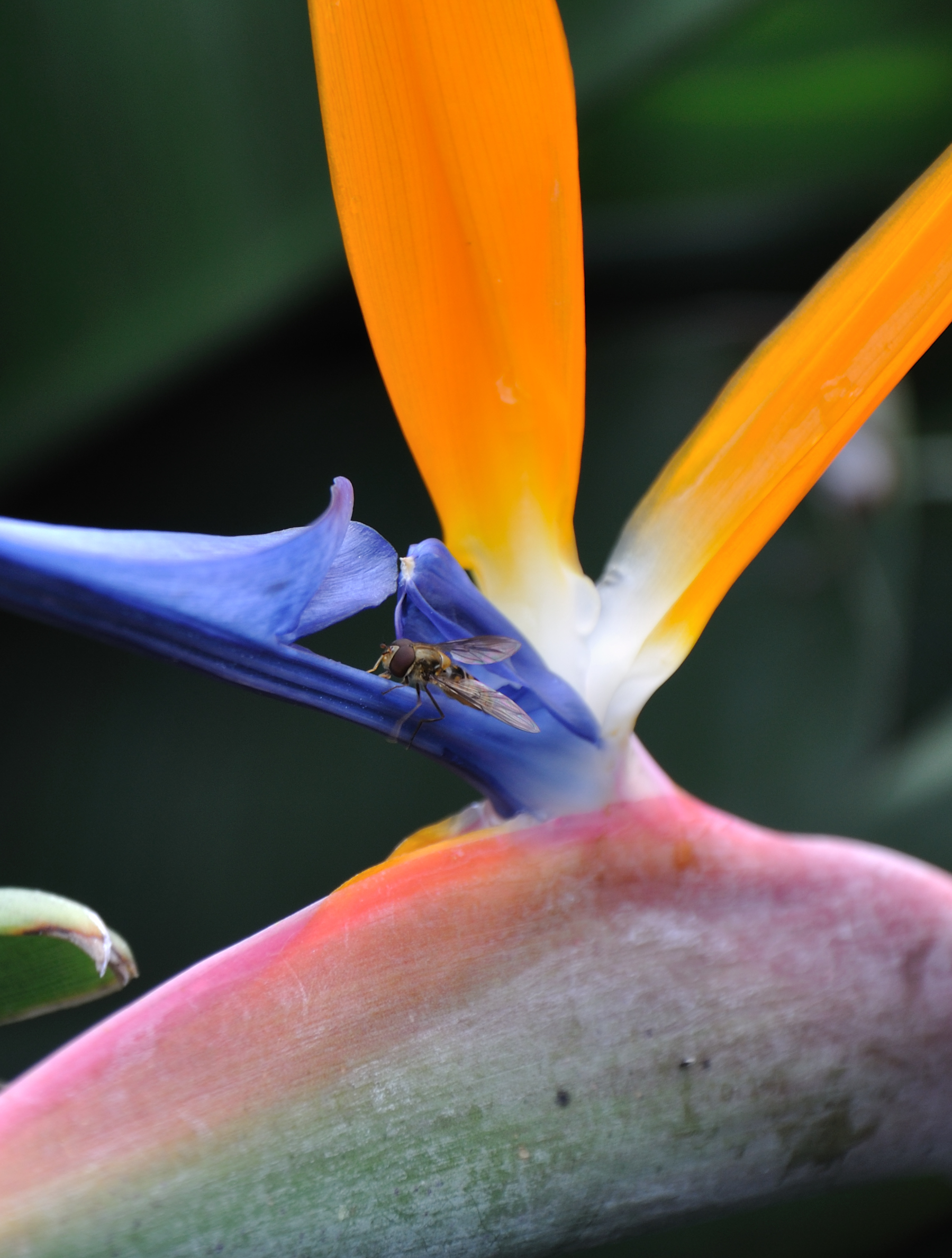
closeup, Jardim Botânico da Madeira

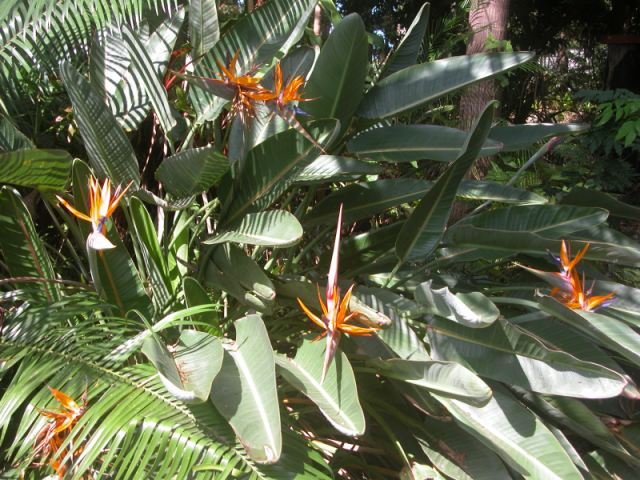
Bermuda Botanical Gardens

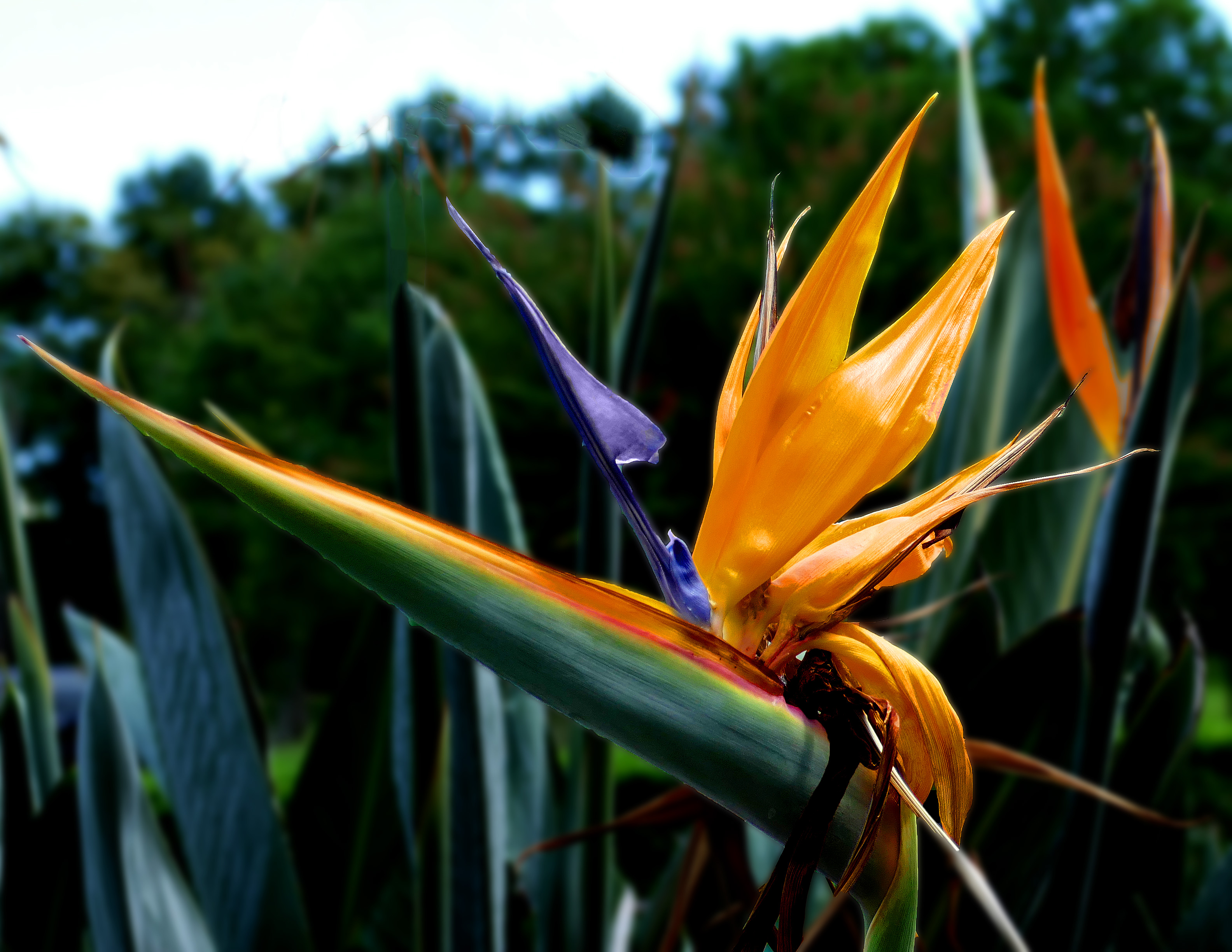
Nassau Bay, Texas

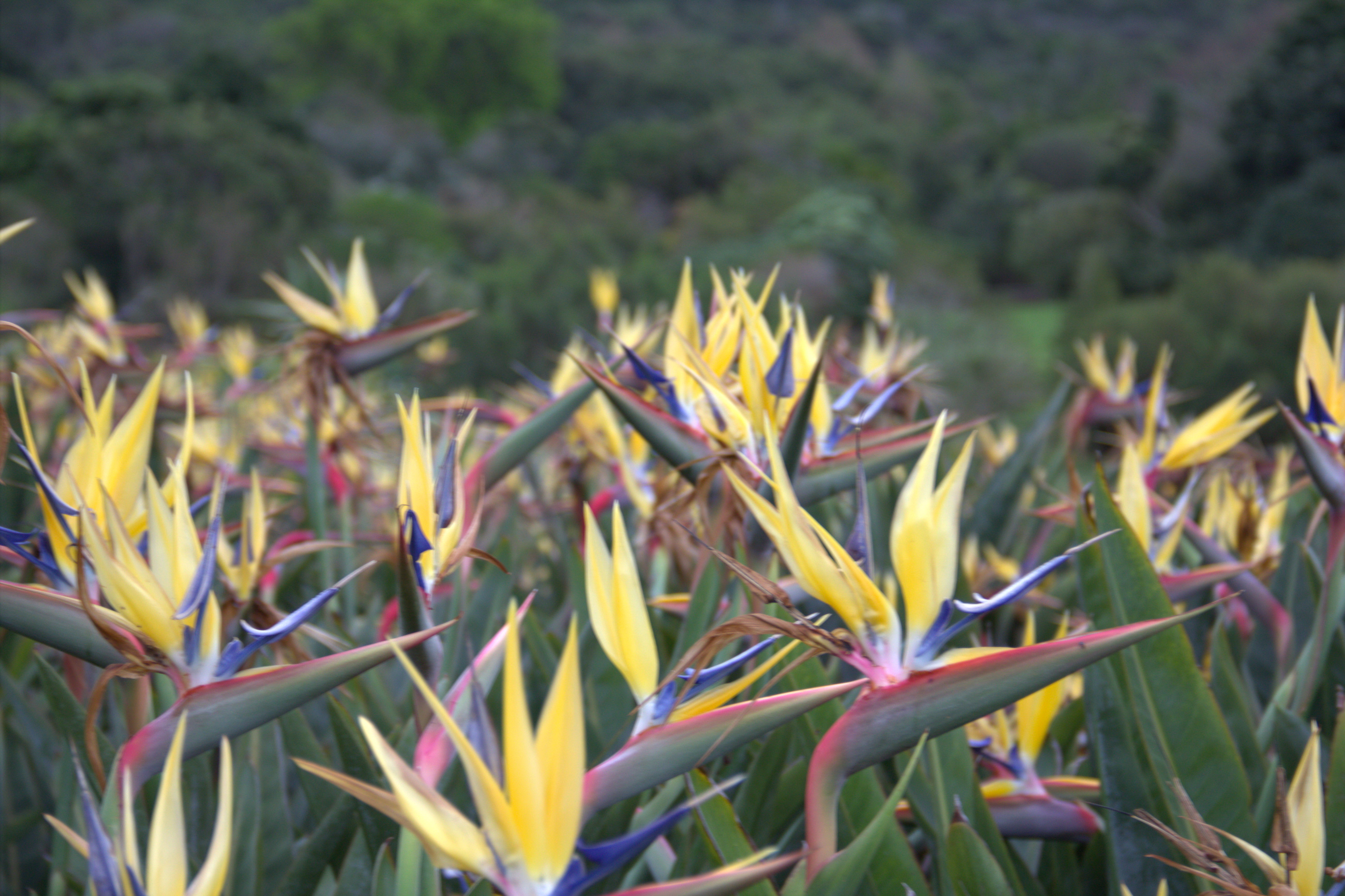
'Mandela's Gold', Kirstenbosch National Botanical Garden, Cape Town

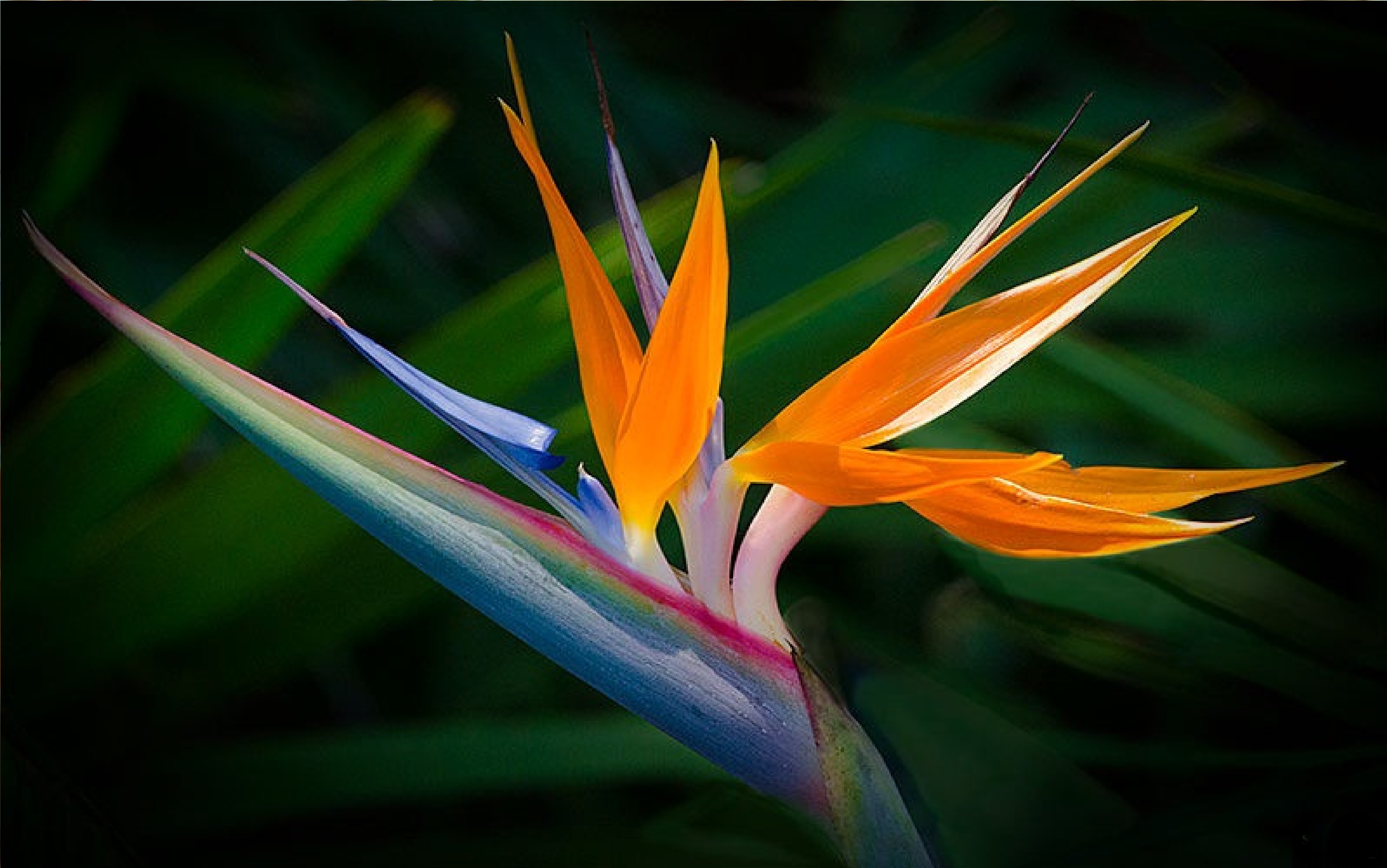
Kolkata, India

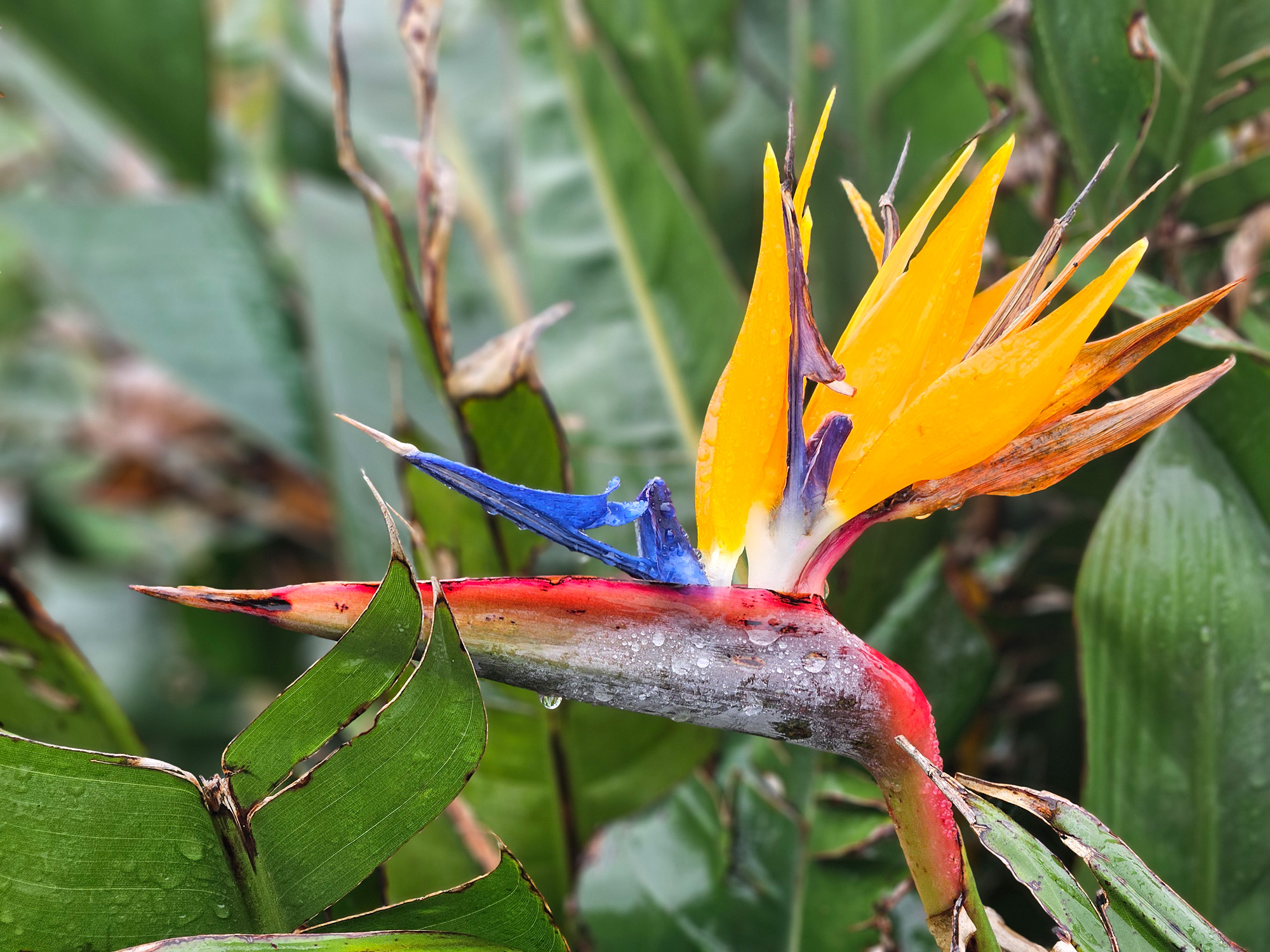
Strelitzia reginae Banks, Azores

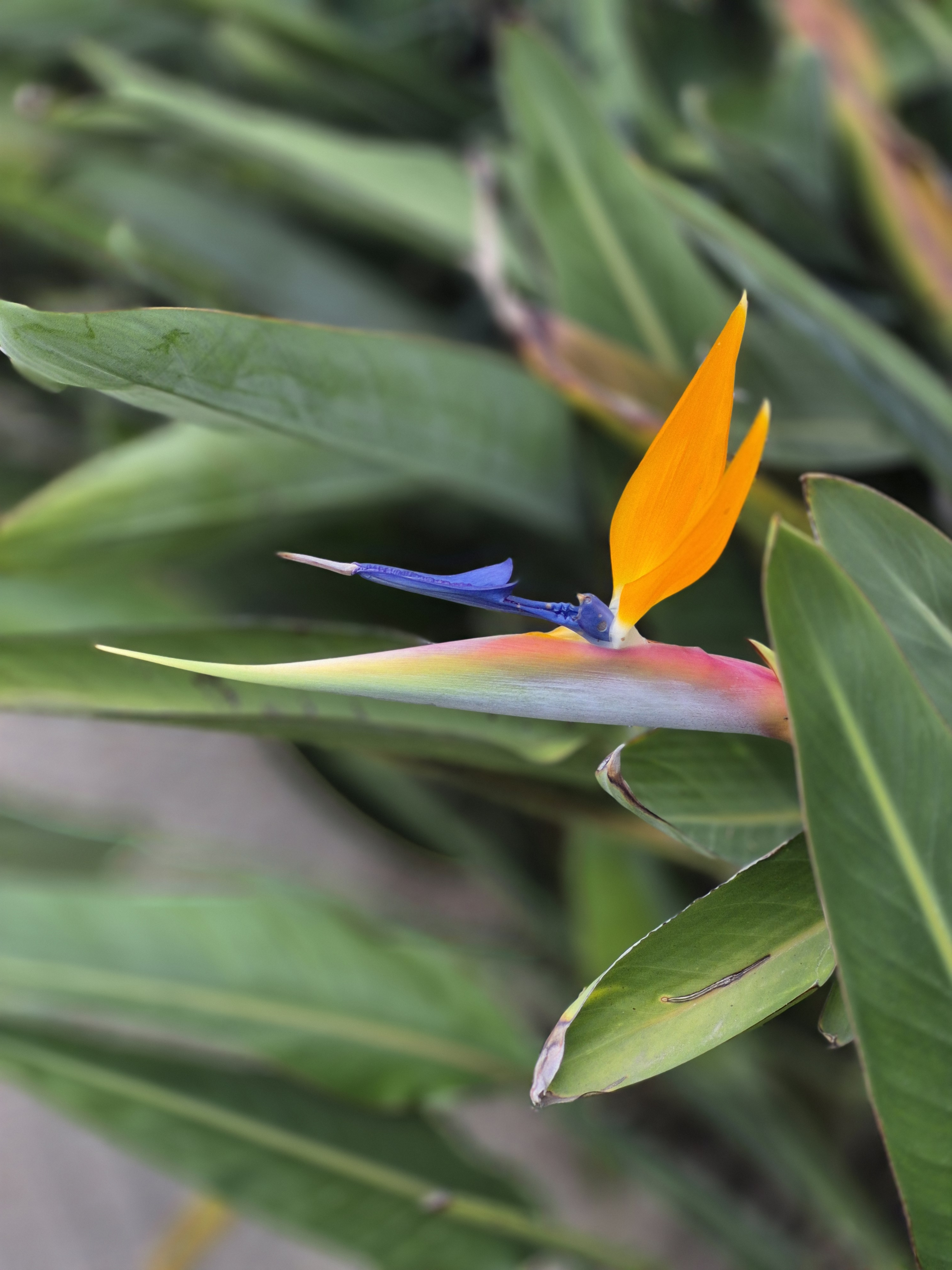
In southern Brazil
