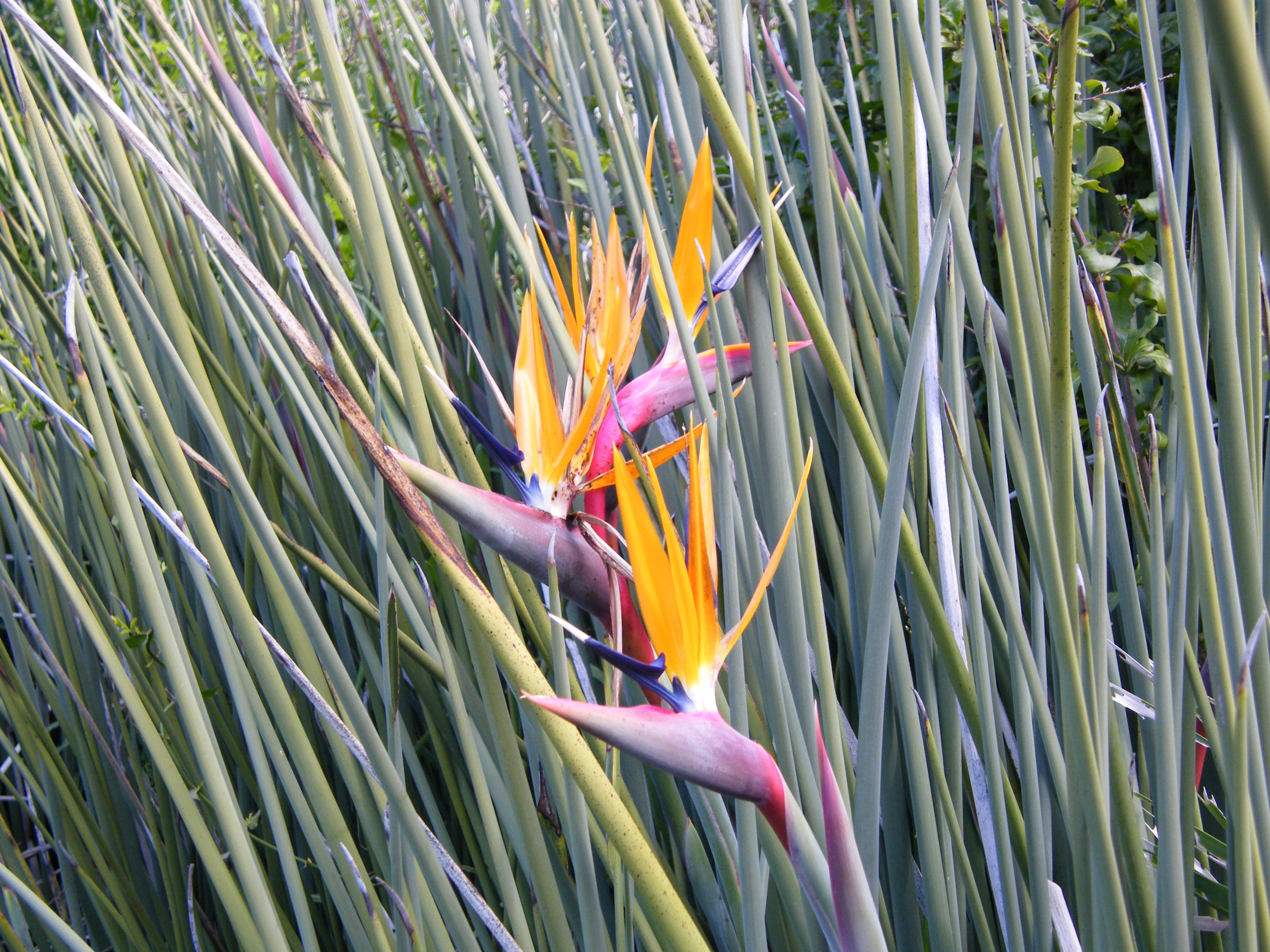
- Cultivated specimen in the Kirstenbosch National Botanical Garden

Conservation status
- Vulnerable (IUCN 3.1)

Scientific classification
- Kingdom: Plantae
- Clade: Tracheophytes
- Clade: Angiosperms
- Clade: Monocots
- Clade: Commelinids
- Order: Zingiberales
- Family: Strelitziaceae
- Genus: Strelitzia
- Species: S. juncea

Binomial name
- Strelitzia juncea Andrews

- Approximate distribution of Strelitzia juncea in South Africa

Synonyms
- Strelitzia parvifolia var. juncea (Andrews) Ker Gawl.; Strelitzia reginae var. juncea (Andrews) H.E.Moore; Strelitzia reginae subsp. juncea (Andrews) Sm.; Strelitzia principis Andrews; Strelitzia teretifolia Barrow ex Steud.

= Strelitzia juncea =

Species of flowering plant

Strelitzia juncea, the rush-leaved strelitzia or narrow-leaved bird of paradise, is a monocotyledonous flowering plant that is indigenous to South Africa. This drought-resistant Strelitzia occurs sparingly near Uitenhage, Patensie and just north of Port Elizabeth. It is the only Strelitzia species which typically lacks a lamina, or leaf blade. It also differs from Strelitzia reginae in having an inflorescence that is shorter than the leaves, while those of S. reginae are taller than the leaves. It is threatened in part by illegal removal for horticultural purposes. This species is thought to be one of the most frost-resistant of the genus Strelitzia.

Other common names include strelitzia, bird of paradise, or crane flower though these names are also collectively applied to other species in the genus Strelitzia.
