= Kirstenbosch National Botanical Garden =

Botanical garden at the foot of Table Mountain in Cape Town

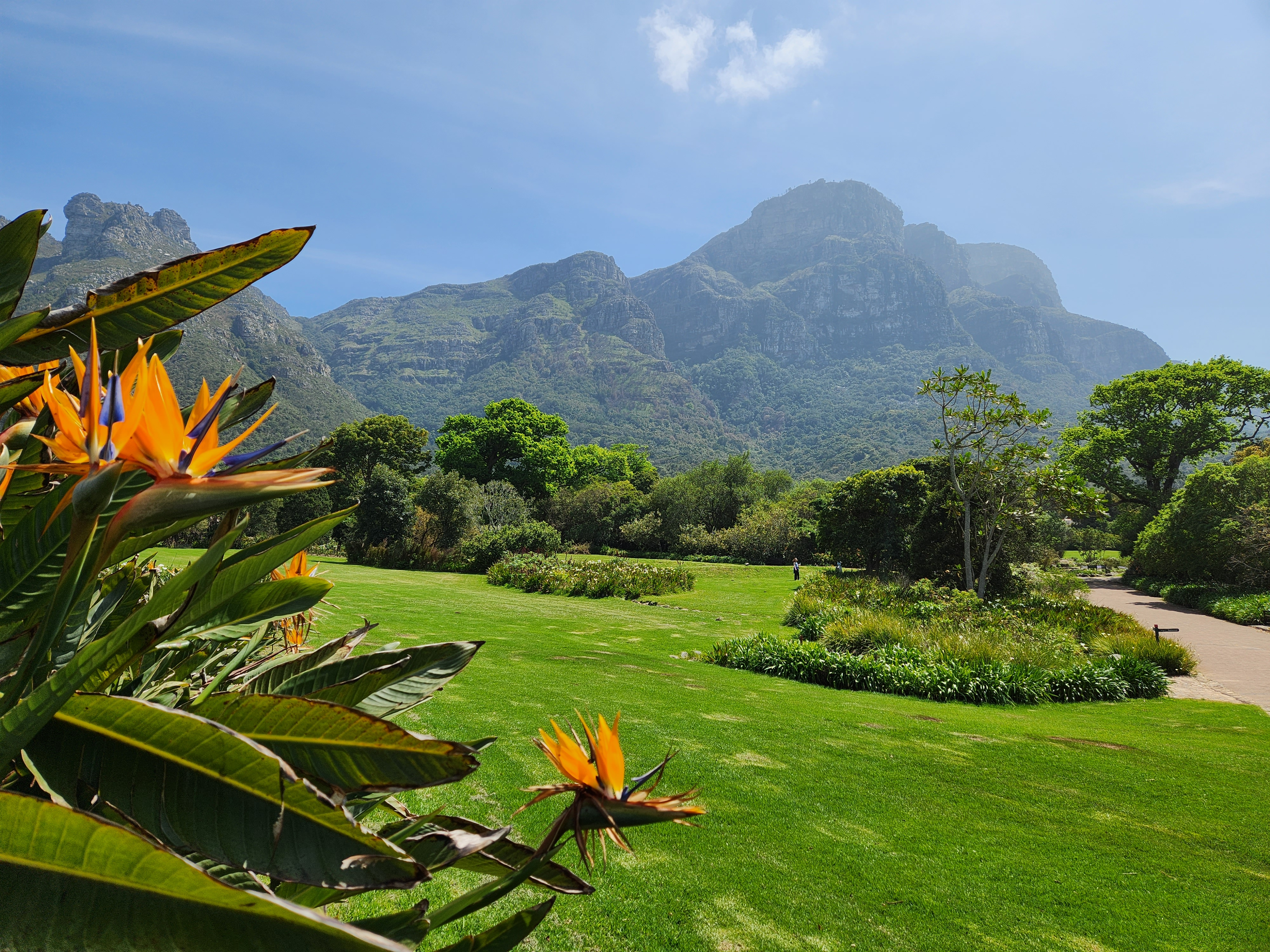
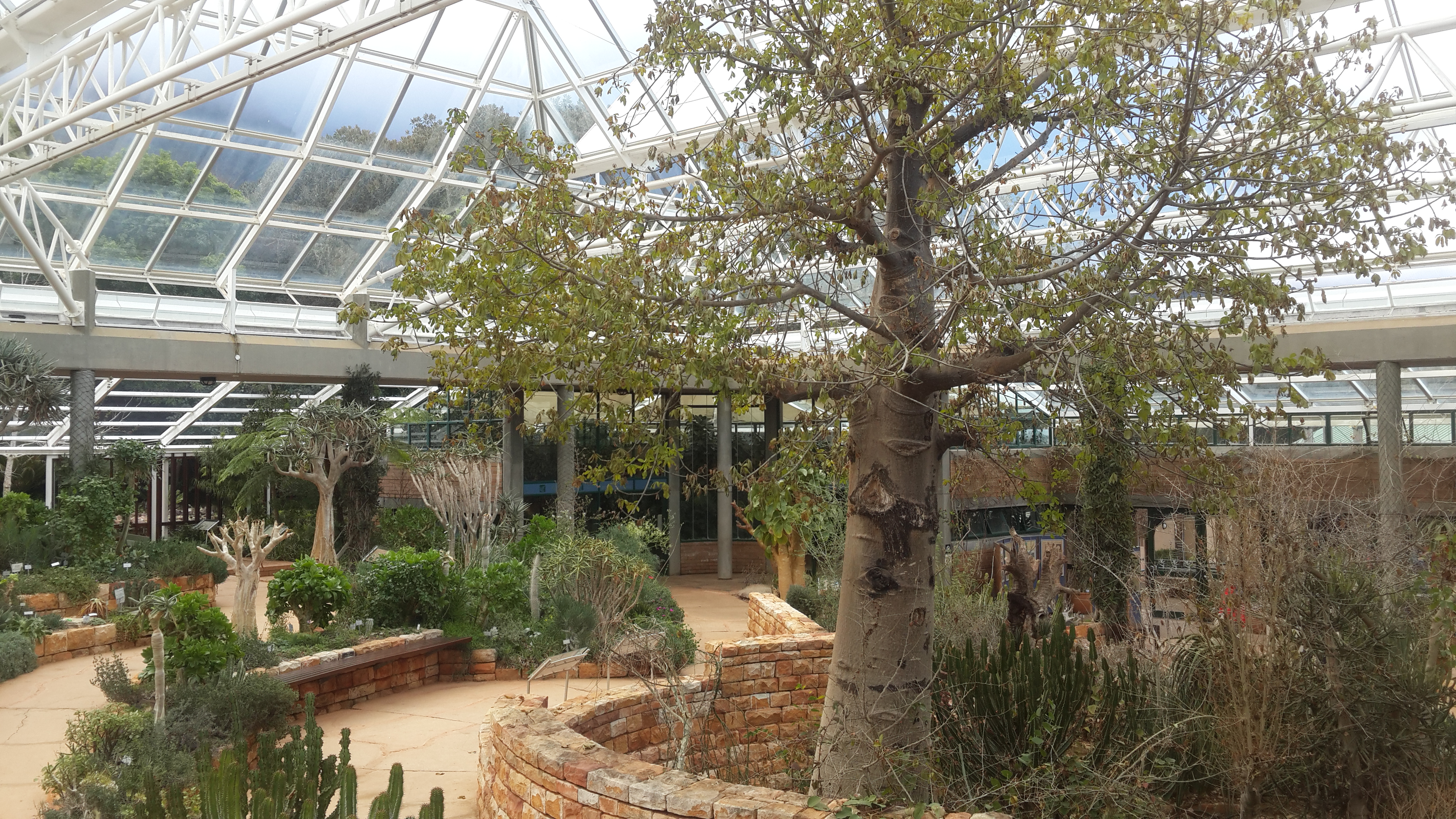
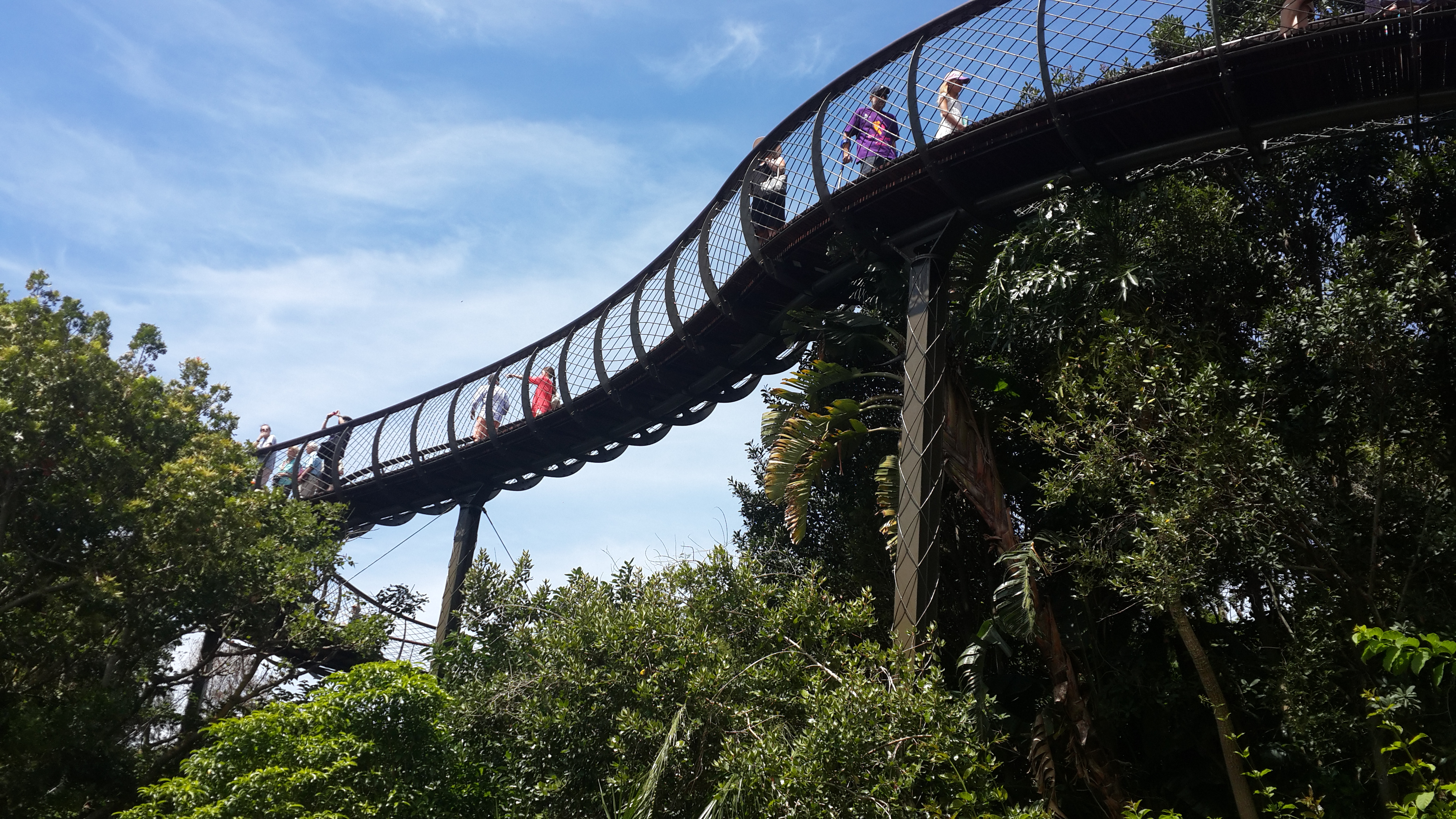
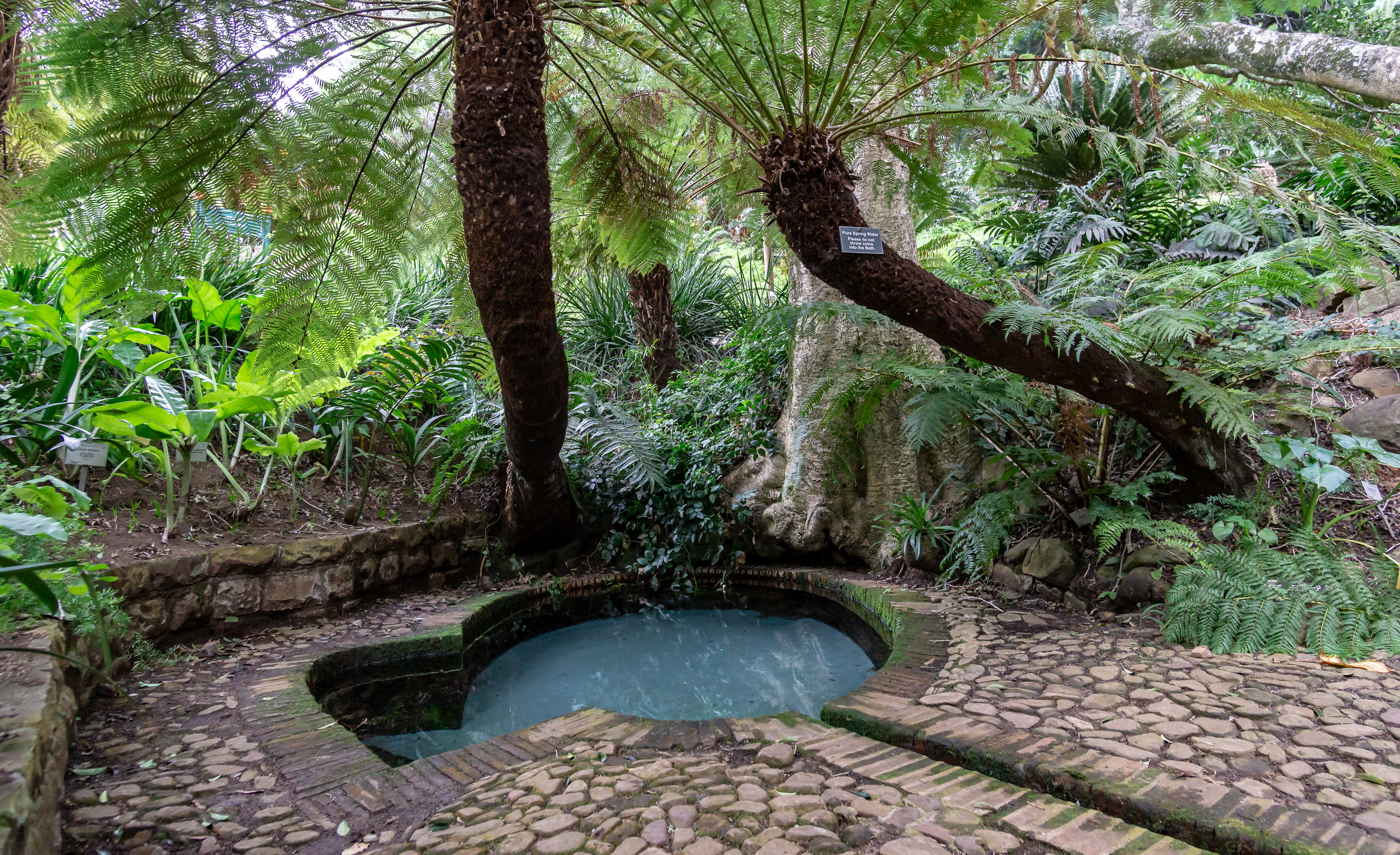
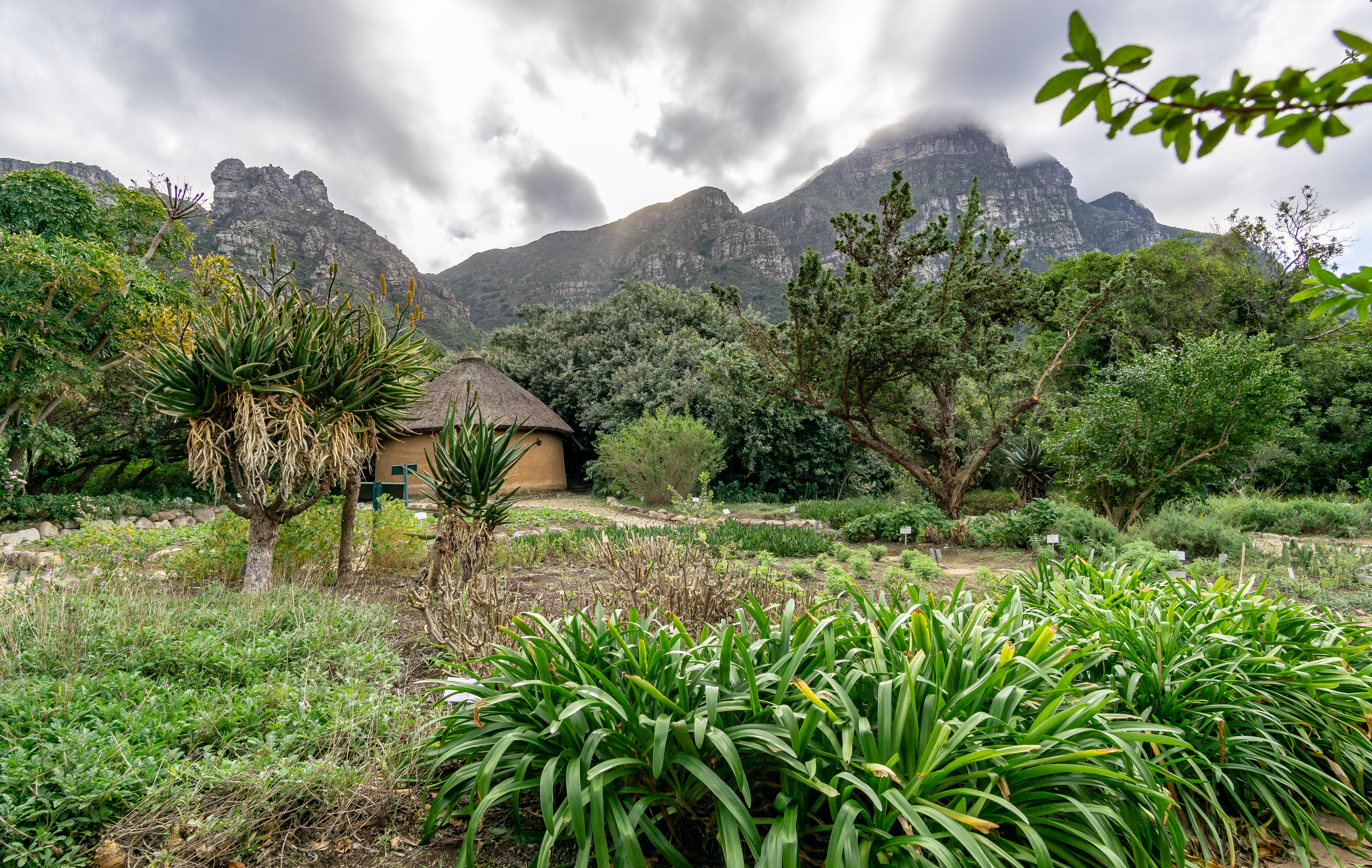
- Top: view of the gardens facing northwest with Table Mountain dominating the skyline, the garden's symbol flower, Strelitzia reginae, is visible in the foreground. Mid-left: inside the conservatory housing plants from arid biomes. Mid-right: the Centenary Tree Canopy Walkway (also known as the "boomslang"). Lower left: Colonel Bird’s Bath (also known as Lady Anne Barnard’s Bath). Lower right: the indigenous herb garden.
- Interactive map of Kirstenbosch National Botanical Garden
- Type: Botanical garden
- Location: Cape Town, Western Cape, South Africa
- Coordinates: 33°59′15″S 18°25′57″E
- Area: 528 hectares (1,300 acres)
- Created: 13 July 1913; 113 years ago
- Operator: South African National Biodiversity Institute (SANBI)
- Website: sanbi.org/gardens/kirstenbosch

Kirstenbosch is a botanical garden nestled at the eastern foot of Table Mountain in Cape Town. The garden is one of 10 National Botanical Gardens covering five of South Africa's six different biomes and administered by the South African National Biodiversity Institute (SANBI). Prior to 1 September 2004, the institute was known as the National Botanical Institute.

Kirstenbosch places a strong emphasis on the cultivation of indigenous plants. When Kirstenbosch was founded in 1913 to preserve the flora native to the South Africa’s territory, it was the first botanical garden in the world with this ethos, at a time when invasive species were not considered an ecological and environmental problem.

The garden includes a large conservatory (The Botanical Society Conservatory) exhibiting plants from a number of different regions, including savanna, fynbos, karoo, and others. Outdoors, the focus is on plants native to the Cape region, highlighted by the spectacular collections of proteas. It is a level IV accredited arboretum under the ArbNet Arboretum Accreditation Program and The Morton Arboretum.

== History ==
In 1660, by order of Jan van Riebeeck, a hedge of wild almond and brambles was planted to afford some protection to the perimeter of the Dutch Cape Colony. Sections of this hedge, named Van Riebeeck's Hedge, still exist in Kirstenbosch. The hedge is a Provincial Heritage Site. The area of the botanical garden was used for the harvesting of timber during this period.

The Kirsten part of the name is believed to be the surname of the manager of the land, J.F. Kirsten, in the 18th century. The bosch part of the name is a Dutch word for forest or bush.

The handover of ownership of the colony to Britain in 1811 brought changes in the use of the Kirstenbosch area. Two large land grants were made, with a Colonel Bird building a house, planting chestnut trees, and establishing a bath (still extant) fed by a natural spring. The Ecksteen family acquired the land in 1823, and it later came into the possession of the Cloete family (a well-known Cape lineage). Under their stewardship, the area was farmed more formally, being planted with oaks, fruit trees, and vineyards.

The land was thereafter purchased by Cecil Rhodes in 1895. After this point, the area became run-down, with large groups of pigs feeding on the acorns and wallowing in the pools. The famous Camphor Avenue was planted in 1898. The land now occupied by the Kirstenbosch Gardens was bequeathed to the nation by Rhodes, who died in 1902.

The history of the area as a botanical garden has its origin in Henry Harold Pearson, a botanist from Cambridge University who came to the Cape Colony in 1903 to take up a position as professor in the newly created chair of botany at the South African College (the predecessor of today's University of Cape Town.) In February 1911, Pearson visited the area of Kirstenbosch by cart with Neville Stuart Pillans to assess its suitability as a site for a botanical garden.

On 1 July 1913, the area was set aside for this purpose by the government of the colony, with an annual budget of £1,000 (equivalent to R415,000 in 2018). No money was set aside for a salaried director's position, but Pearson accepted the position without pay. He lived in the gardens in difficult and reduced circumstances.

The task confronting Pearson was formidable. The area was overgrown, populated by wild pigs, overrun with weeds, and planted with orchards. Money was tight, and the budget was supplemented by the sale of firewood and acorns. Pearson commenced work in the area of Kirstenbosch known as "The Dell", planting cycads which are still visible there today.

Pearson died in 1916 from pneumonia. He was buried in his beloved garden, and his epitaph is still there today: "If ye seek his monument, look around". Since 1913, the garden has been successively administered by the Botanical Society of South Africa, the National Botanic Gardens of South Africa, the National Botanical Institute, and the South African Biodiversity Institute (SANBI) from 2004. The garden celebrated its centenary in 2013, issuing the commemorative book Kirstenbosch: The Most Beautiful Garden in Africa.

== Research ==
Kirstenbosch scientists, such as Winsome Barker, Graham Duncan, and John Manning, have published many scientific papers, books, and monographs on South African flora, including the Kirstenbosch Gardening Series. The gardens have also published a series of monographs, known sequentially as Memoirs of the Botanical Survey of South Africa, Annals of the Kirstenbosch Botanic Gardens, and Strelitzia.

=== Compton Herbarium ===
The Compton Herbarium, which conducts research activities including identifying and describing new species, is located at the Kirstenbosch National Botanical Garden.

==== Purpose ====
The herbarium is mainly geared toward studying the plant species of the winter rainfall region. Roughly 250,000 dried specimens are preserved here. Local and foreign botanists research proteas, heaths, amaryllis, and orchids. Conservationists, foresters, entomologists, and manufacturers of pesticides and fertilizers also participate in research here. A large library with relevant books is available for researchers.

==== History ====
The Compton Herbarium was founded after the Bolus Herbarium moved from Kirstenbosch to the campus of the University of Cape Town. Prof. Robert Harold Compton, the second director of Kirstenbosch, kept a small herbarium in his office since 1937. In 1940, this was moved to where the Bolus Herbarium had once stood. Later, the Iziko South African Museum Herbarium and the Stellenbosch Government Herbarium were transferred here, as well. Since 1996, the collections have been based in a new, modern research complex.

==== South African Museum Herbarium ====
This collection contains many valuable plants from all over the world; the oldest herbarium in the country, it is also one of the oldest in the Southern Hemisphere. In 1825, Danish botanist Christian Friedrich Ecklon brought 325 species to the museum. Dr. Karl Wilhelm Ludwig Pappe came into possession of the collection in 1855, and was appointed the first colonial botanist in the Cape in 1858.

Pappe also built his own private herbarium and bought that of Karl Ludwig Philipp Zeyher. After Pappe's death, the Cape Colony government purchased the Pappe and Zeyher collections. Since 1956, the three herbaria have been housed at Kirstenbosch with the Compton Herbarium, but they remain a separate union. Only in 1988 did they become the property of the SANBI.

==== Stellenbosch Government Herbarium ====
This herbarium was established by Dr. Augusta Vera Duthie in 1902. In 1960, it was donated to the state by the Stellenbosch University, and since then has been known under this name. In 1996, it was moved to Kirstenbosch and incorporated into the Compton Herbarium.

== Chelsea Flower Show ==
In 2008, the Kirstenbosch exhibit at the Chelsea Flower Show won a gold medal for the most creative display and the President's Cup (a new award by the Royal Horticultural Society president Peter Buckley to his favourite stand). The 2008 exhibit was the 16th designed by David Davidson and Raymond Hudson, which established South Africa "as a front runner in horticulture".

The exhibit was entitled The Heat is On and featured an Aloidendron dichotomum (also known as a quiver tree), which is being studied and monitored as an indicator of climate change. Dead and dying quiver trees were displayed alongside live specimens to illustrate how warmer temperatures have forced the species to migrate southwards. Kirstenbosch has won 29 gold medals at the Chelsea Flower Show in 33 appearances.

== Recreational use ==
Kirstenbosch enjoys great popularity with residents and visitors. From the gardens, several trails lead off along and up the mountain slopes, and these are much used by walkers and mountaineers. One of the trails, up a ravine called Skeleton Gorge, is an easy and popular route to the summit of Table Mountain.

This route is also known as Smuts' Track after Prime Minister Jan Smuts, who used this route regularly. On the slopes above the cultivated parts of the garden, a contour path leads through forests to Constantia Nek to the south. The same contour path can be followed to the north for quite a distance, and it takes the hiker past the Rhodes Memorial to the slopes of Devil's Peak and beyond.

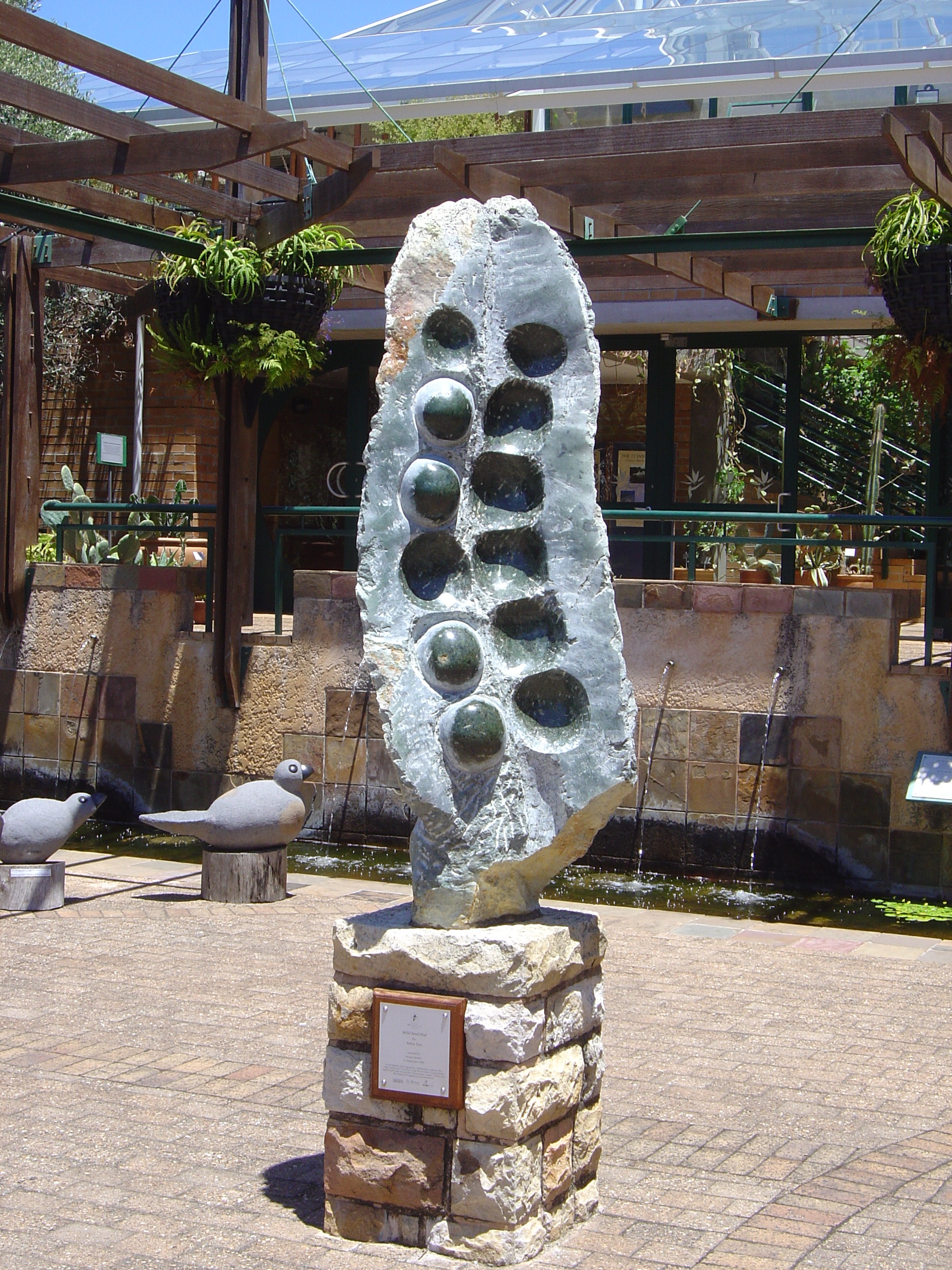
Wild Seed Pod by Arthur Fata at the entrance to Kirstenbosch

Kirstenbosch regularly exhibits Zimbabwean stone sculptures in the gardens. Many of the artists are associated with Chapungu Sculpture Park in Zimbabwe.

In summer, a popular series of outdoor concerts, called Summer Sunset Concerts, is held in the gardens on Sunday evenings. Many well-known local artists such as the Cape Town Philharmonic Orchestra, Johnny Clegg, The Parlotones, Ike Moriz, Arno Carstens, Goldfish, and Mango Groove have performed here. In recent years, several international performers such as Michael Bublé and Cliff Richard have also held concerts on the Kirstenbosch stage.

Activists have occasionally sought to prevent certain South African musicians from performing at the Summer Sunset Concerts at Kirstenbosch. In 2025, it was reported that pro-Palestinian groups, including the Palestine Solidarity Campaign and Mothers4Gaza, called for the removal of David Scott (known by his stage name The Kiffness) from the concert lineup and planned protests at Kirstenbosch. Concert organisers, including Kirstenbosch and SANBI, proceeded with the musical performance and deployed additional security measures to manage disruptions by protesters.

== Recognition ==
In 2015, the International Garden Tourism Awards Body declared Kirstenbosch Botanical Gardens the International Garden of the Year.

== South African National Biodiversity Institute ==
In 1951, the Botanical Research Institute (BRI) was created from the Division of Botany, Pretoria, and in turn, became the National Botanical Institute (NBI) in 1989. In 2004, the National Botanical Institute was absorbed into a broader configuration, the SANBI, by the National Environmental Management: Biodiversity Act (NEMBA).

Since 1921, NBI has published a scientific botanical journal, Bothalia. In 2014, it was renamed Bothalia – African Biodiversity and Conservation to reflect the broader scope of SANBI.

== Gallery ==
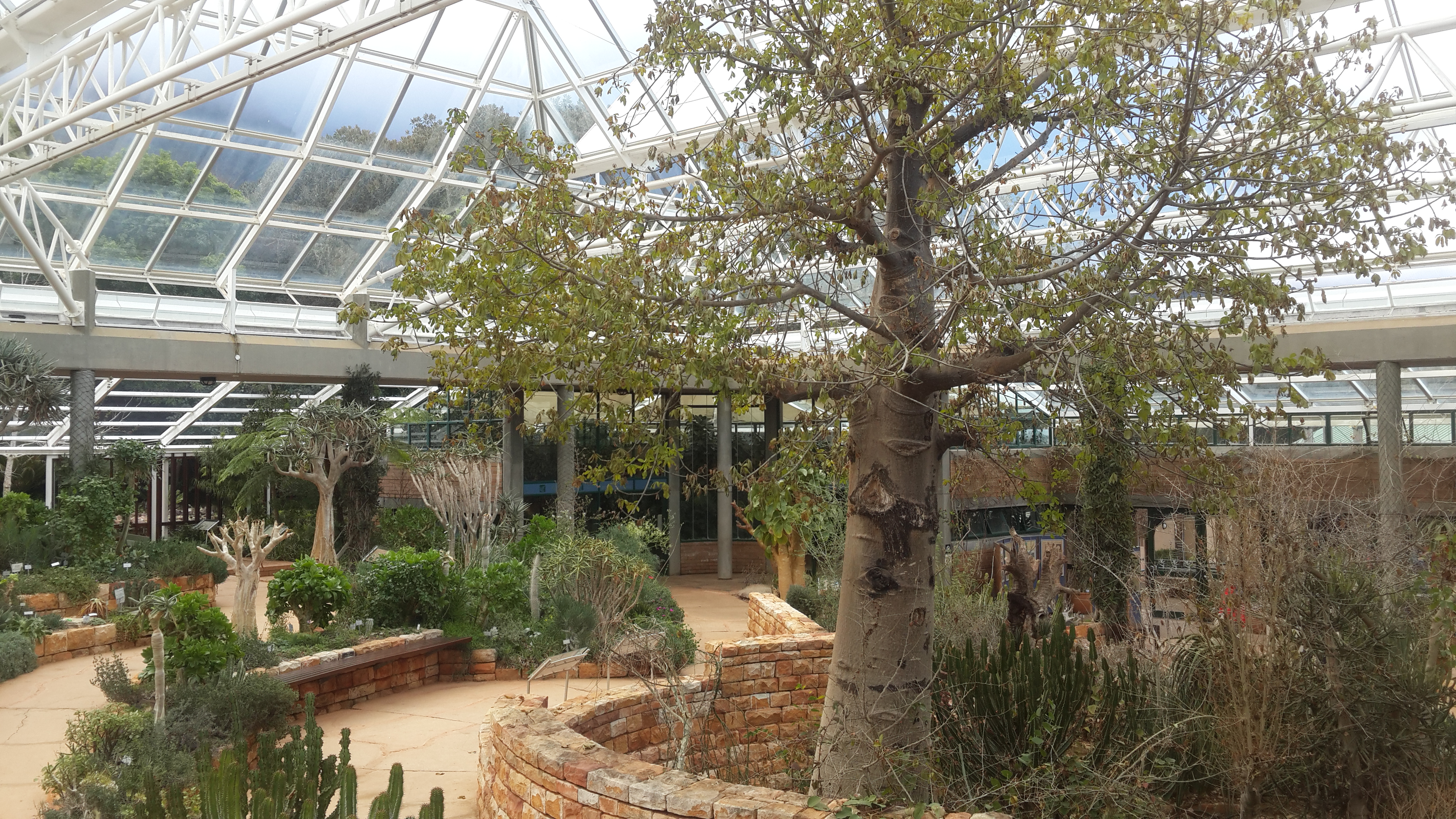
The Botanical Society Conservatory

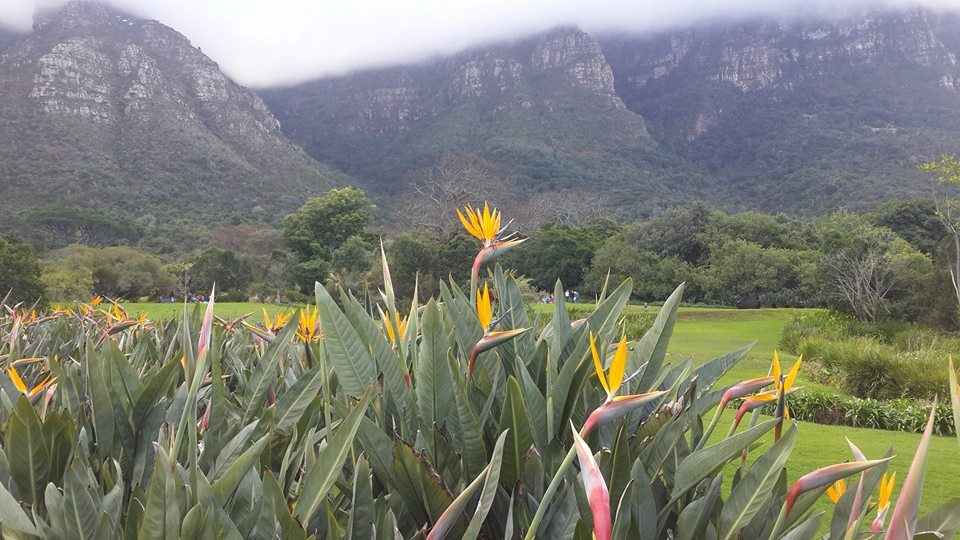
Strelitzia juncea

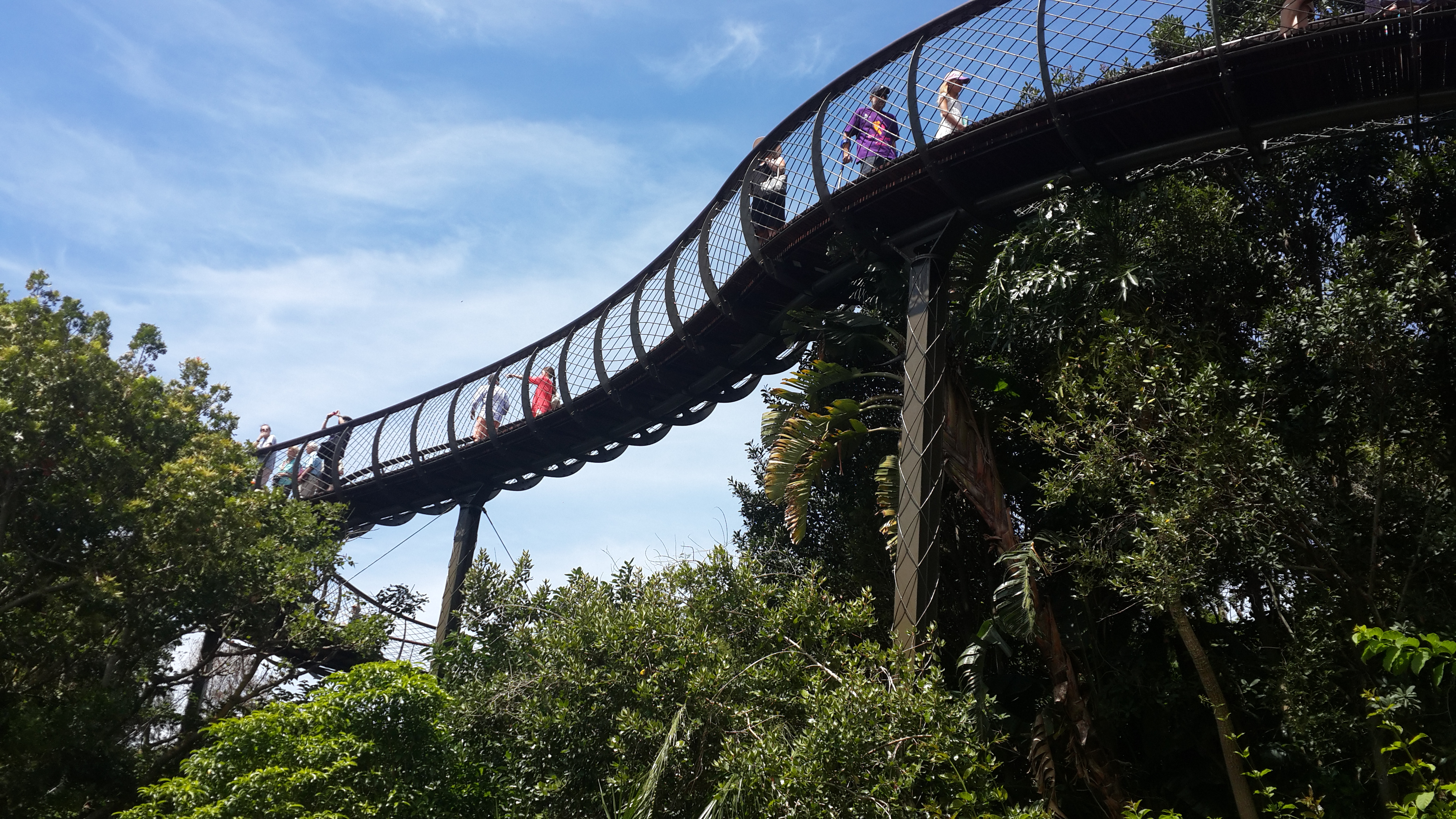
Boomslang, Tree canopy walkway, Arboretum

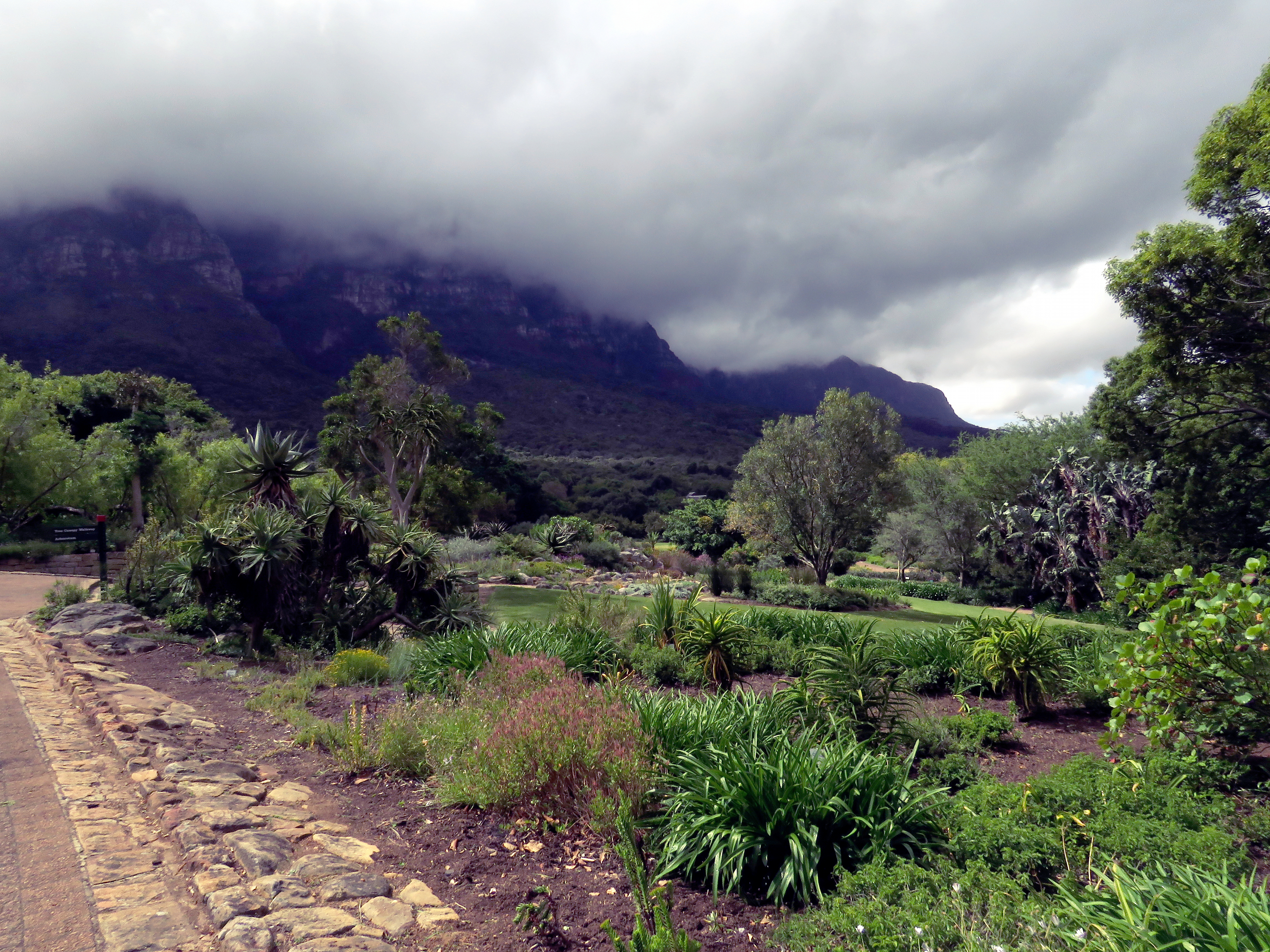
Table Mountain is visible in the background with the 'tablecloth' of clouds shrouding the plateau.

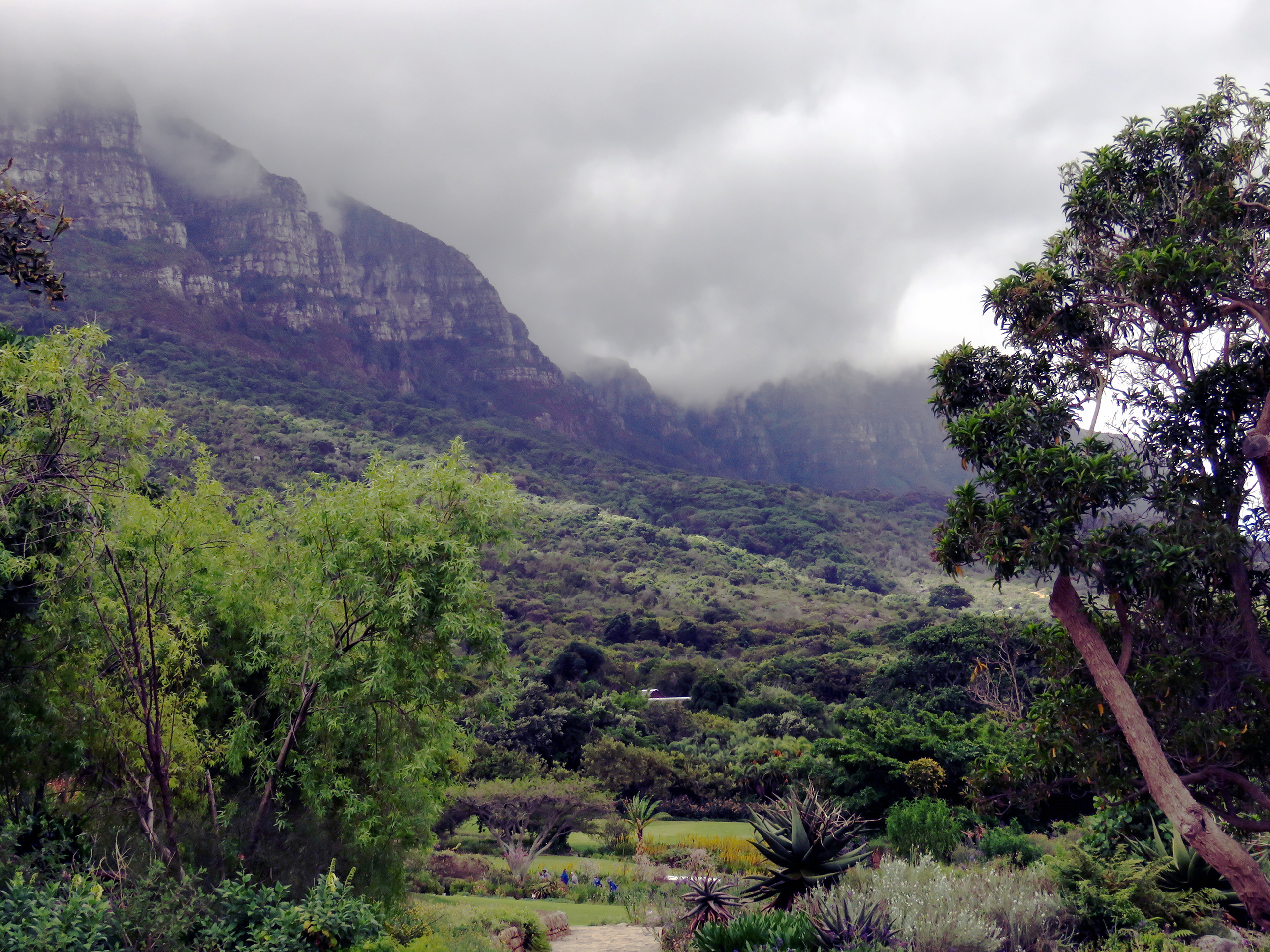
The craggy edge of Table Mountain is visible in the background.

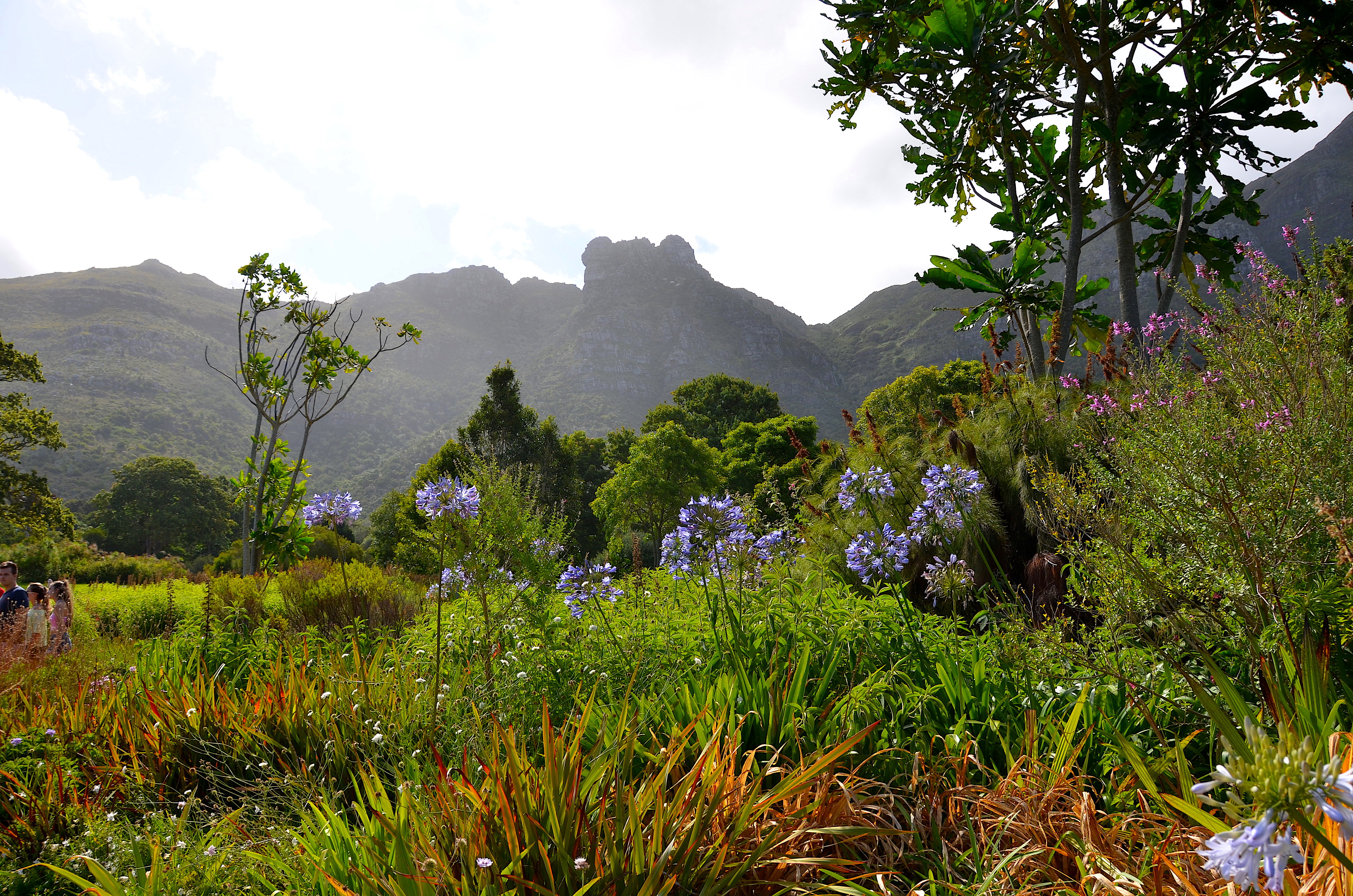
Kirstenbosch Cape Town (2017), view to the west

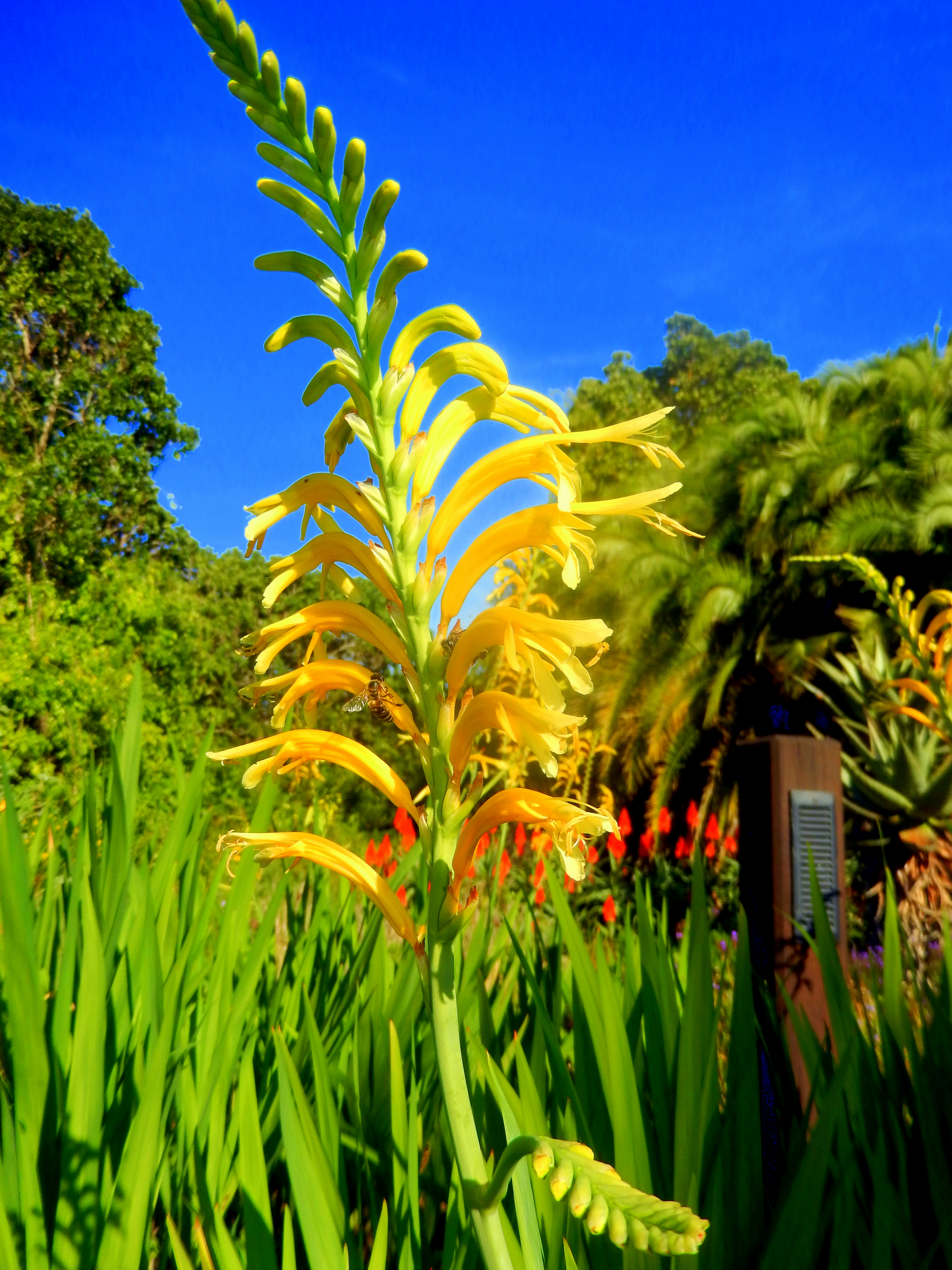

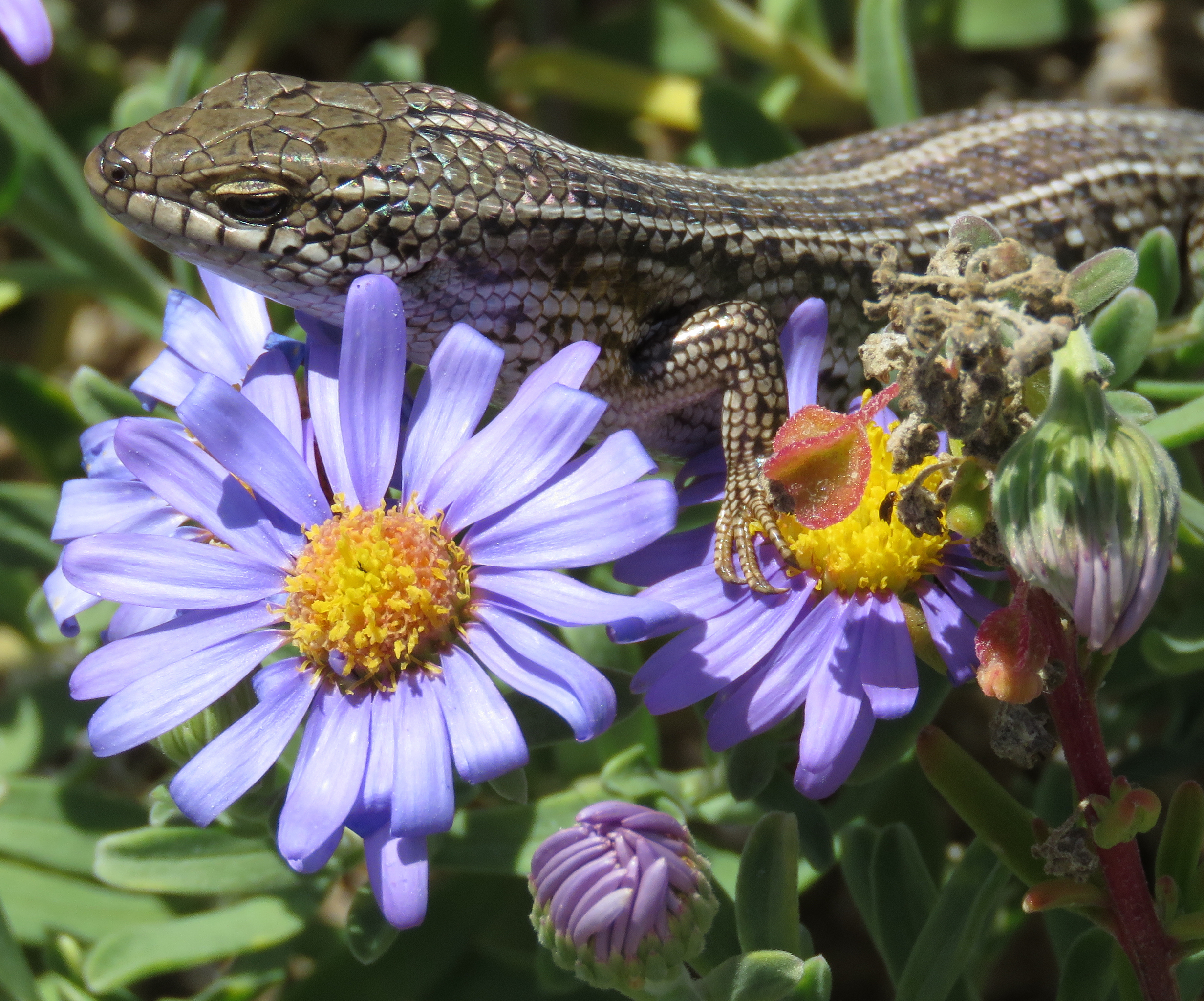

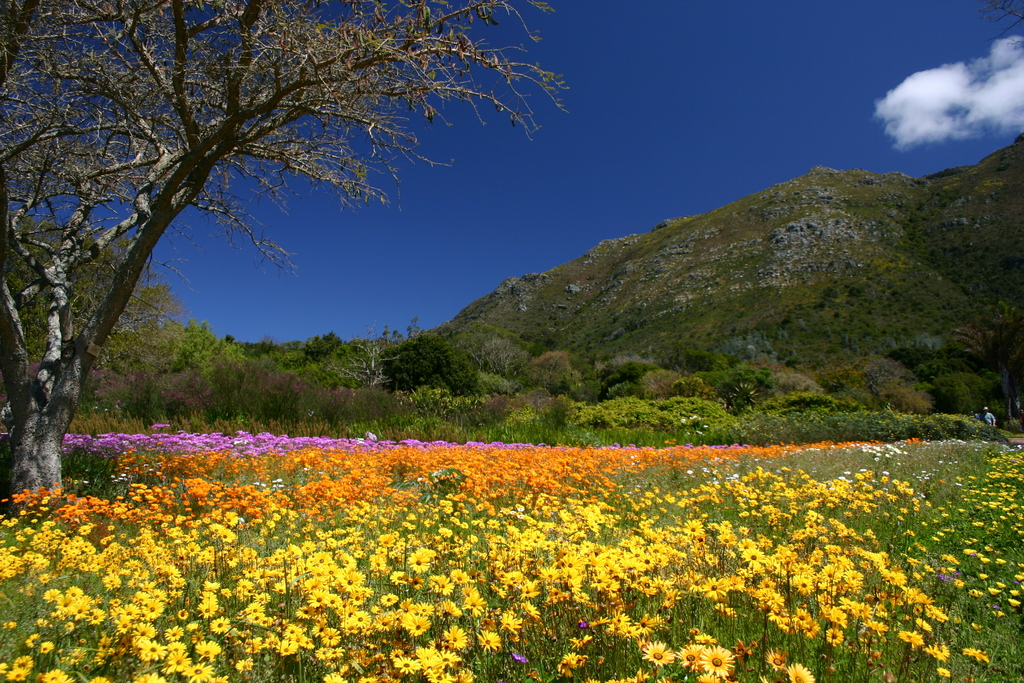
Spring flowering season

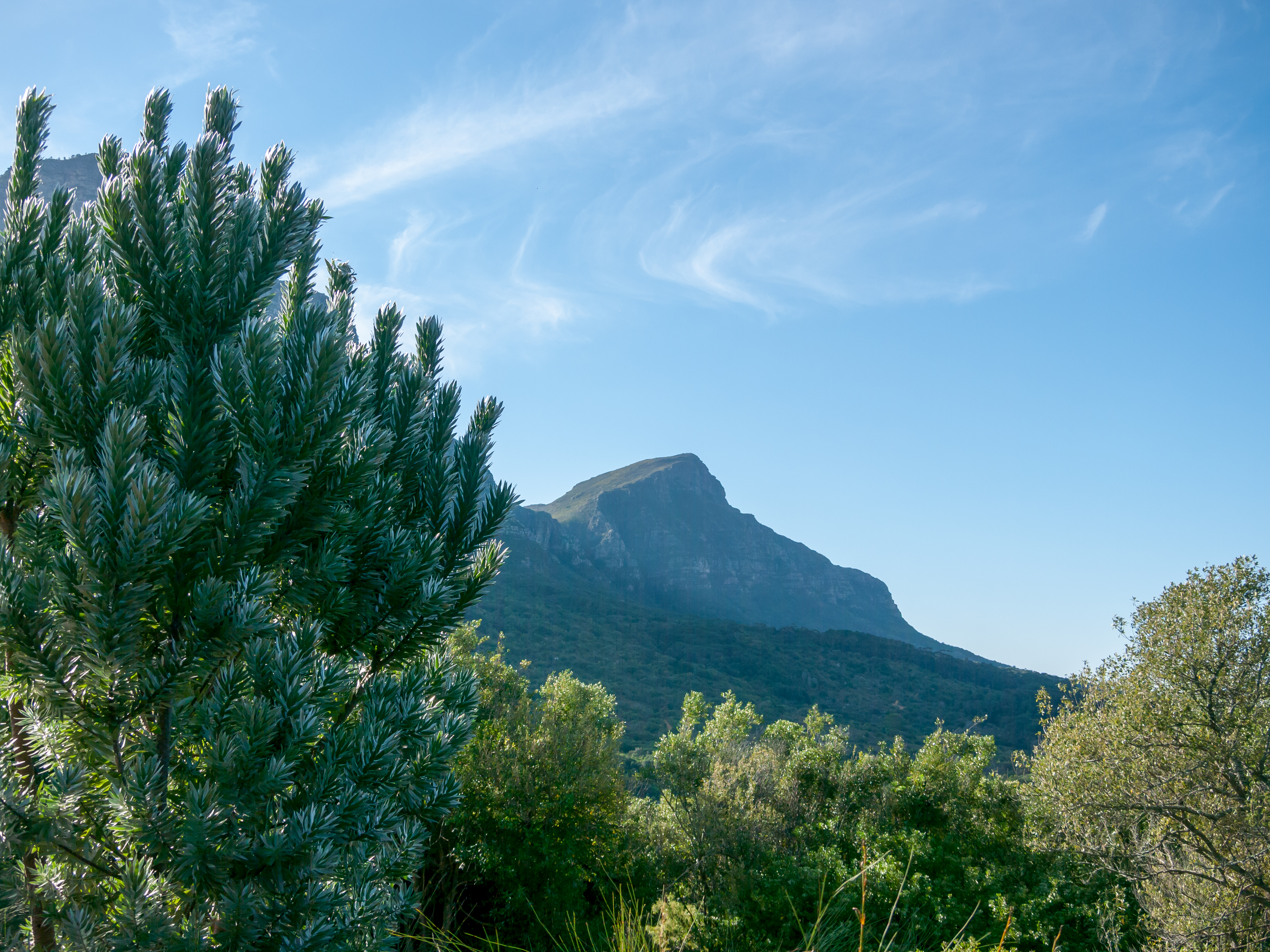
Silver tree grove

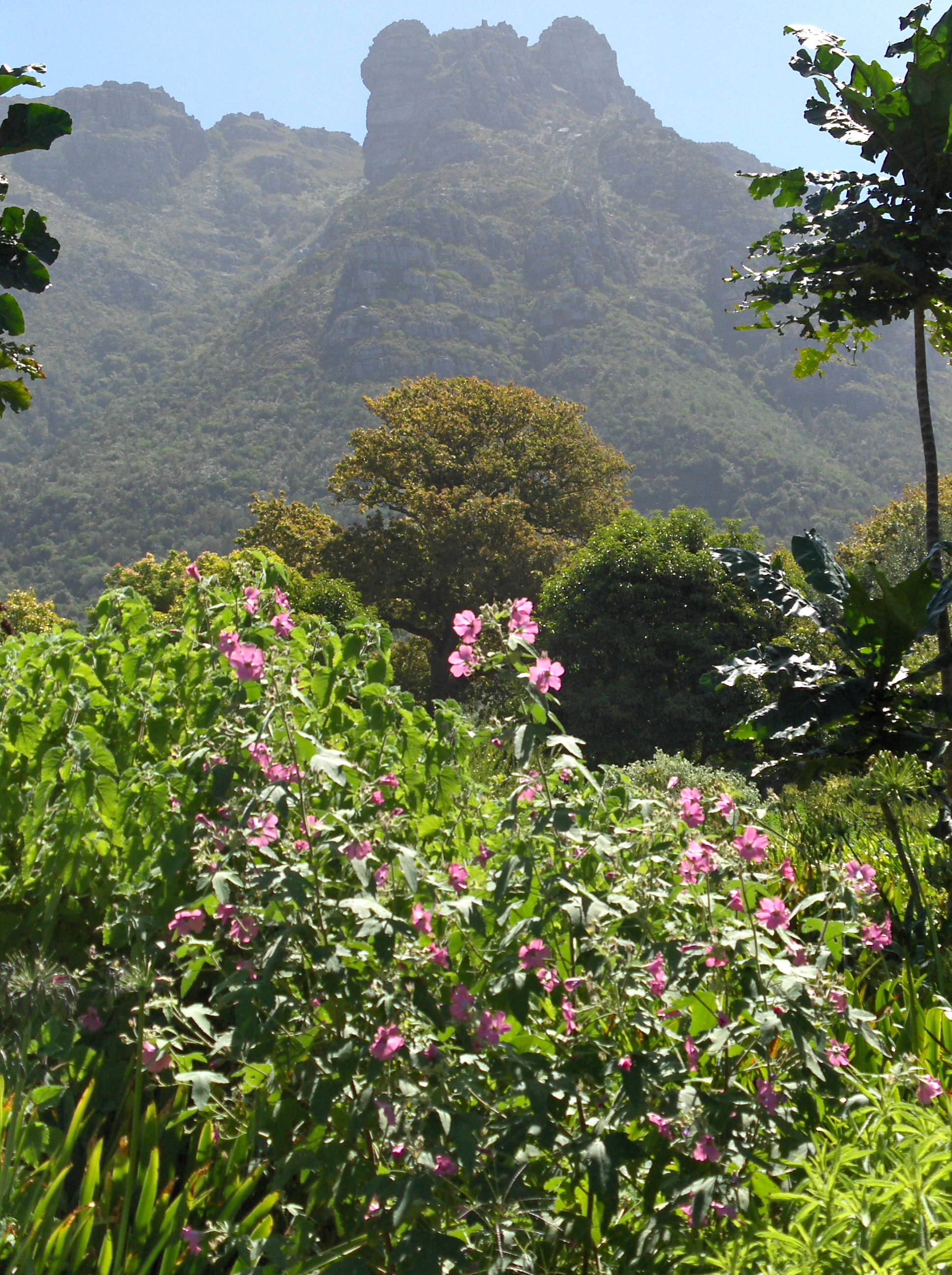

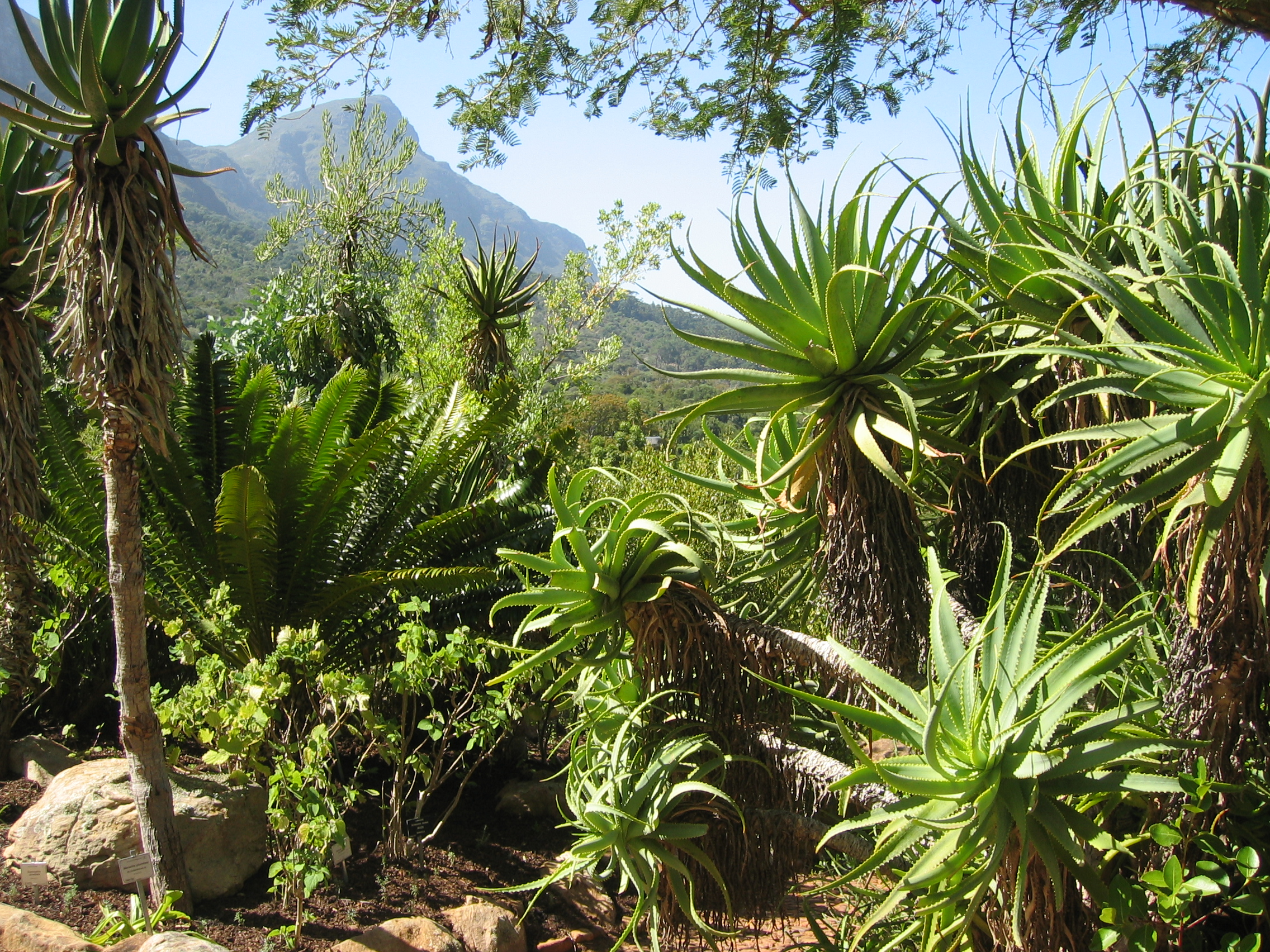

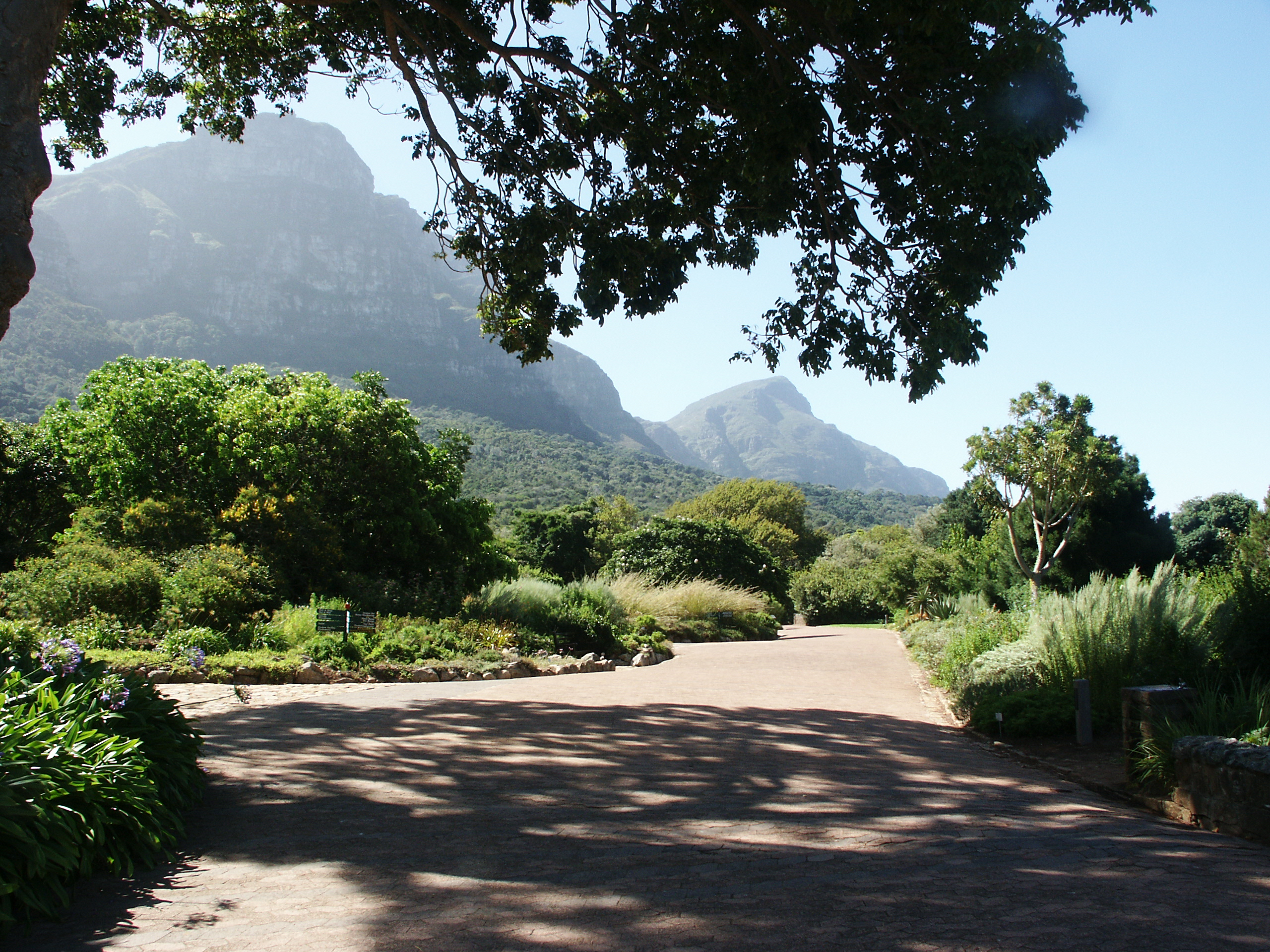

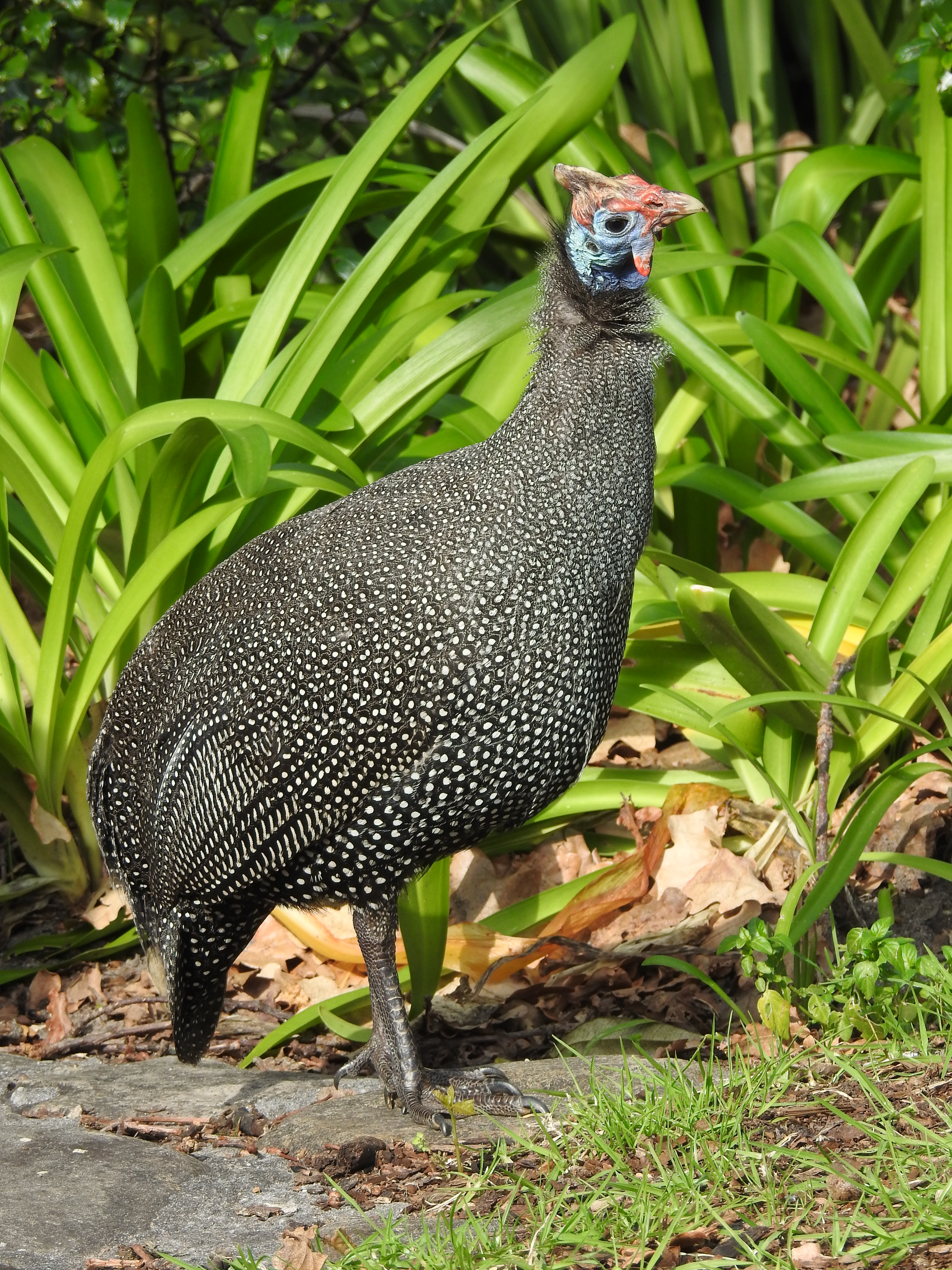
Guineafowl

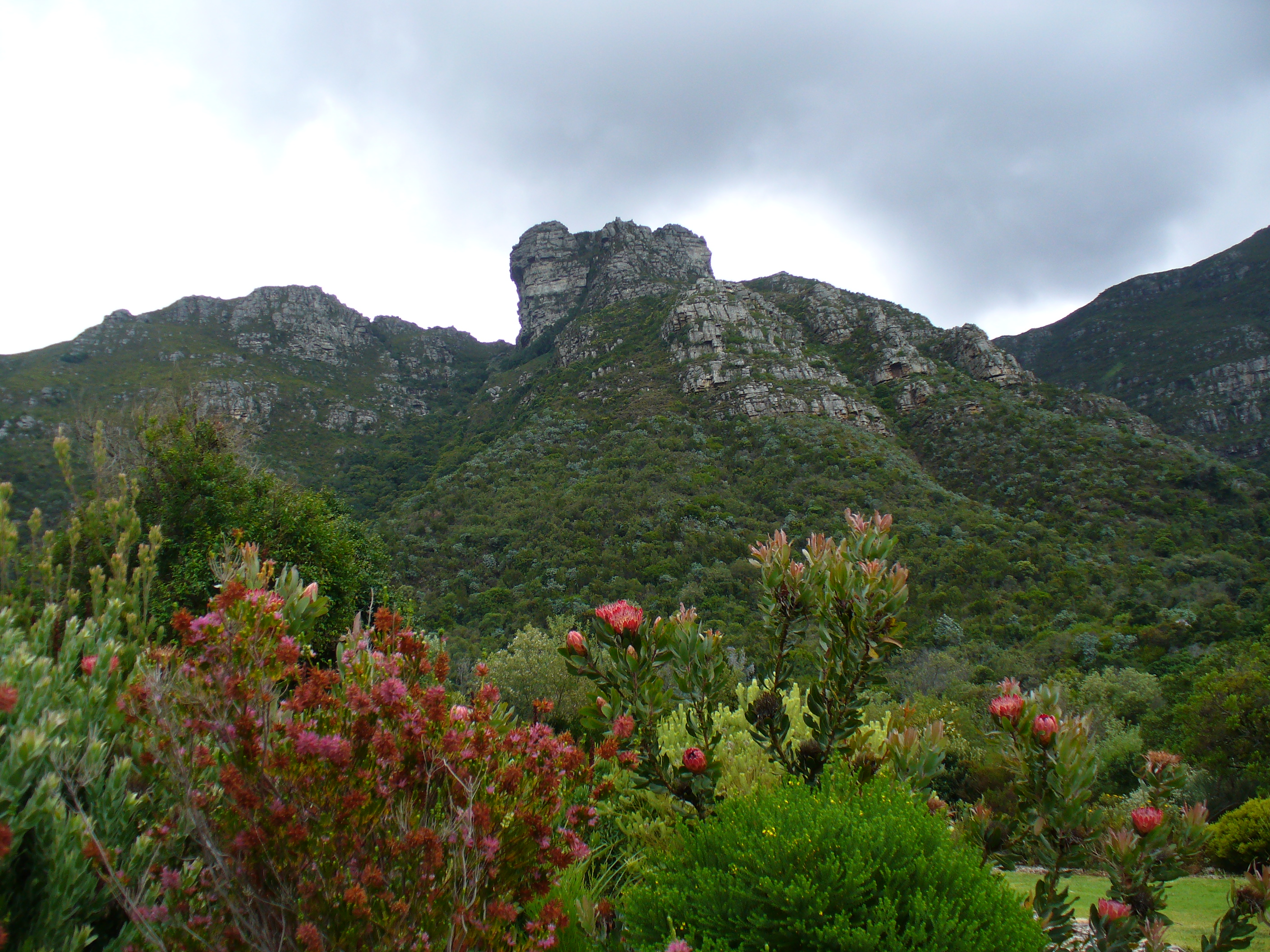
Castle Rock from Kirstenbosch

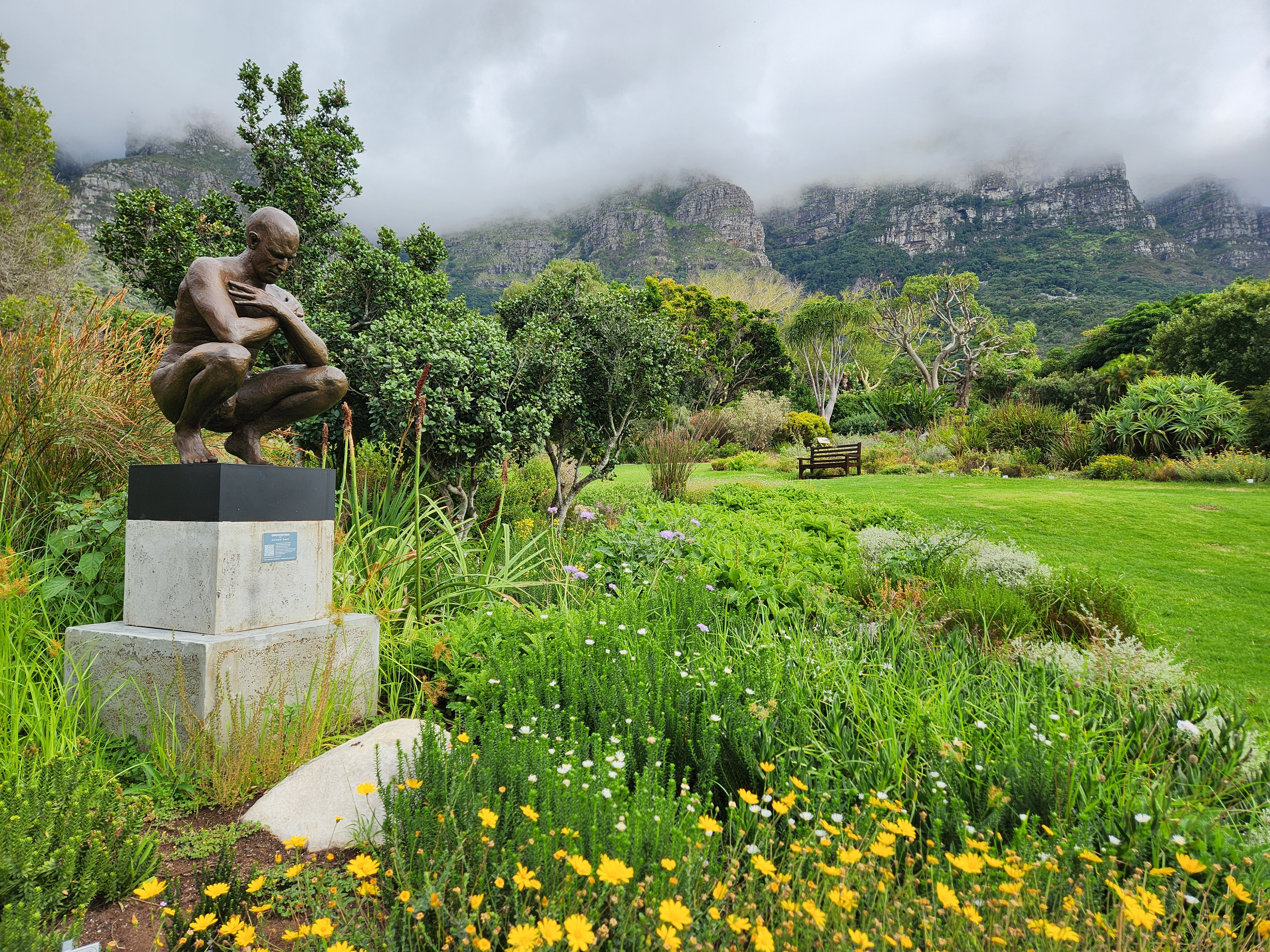
A statue installation in the garden.

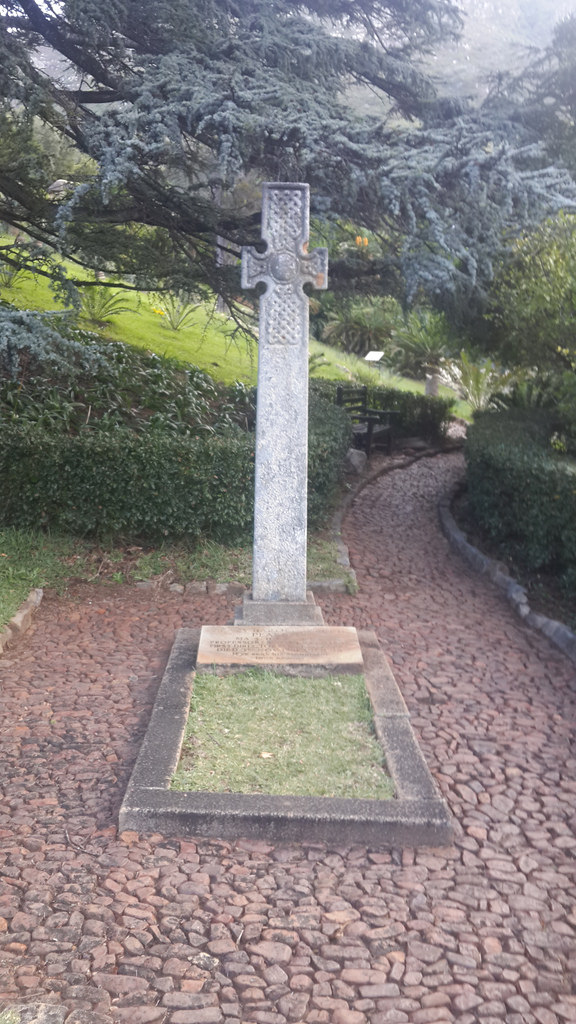
Henry Pearson's last resting place

== See also ==
- Cape Floristic Region

== Bibliography ==
- Green, Lawrence (1949). In the Land of Afternoon. Cape Town: Howard B. Timmins. pp. 247–248.
- Hartigh, Wilma den (17 January 2013). "Kirstenbosch celebrated in print". Media Club South Africa. Archived from the original on 17 November 2016.
- Huntley, Brian J. (2012). Kirstenbosch : the most beautiful garden in Africa. Struik Nature Africa. ISBN 9781431701179.
- Paterson-Jones, Colin; Winter, John (2013). Kirstenbosch: a visitor's guide (2nd ed.). Cape Town: Struik. ISBN 9781775840220.
- Maze, Kristal; Barnett, Mandy; Botts, Emily A.; Stephens, Anthea; Freedman, Mike; Guenther, Lars (2016). "Making the case for biodiversity in South Africa: Re-framing biodiversity communications". Bothalia. 46 (1). doi:10.4102/abc.v46i1.2039. hdl:10019.1/102049. ISSN 2311-9284.
- Victor, Janine E.; Smith, Gideon F.; Van Wyk, Abraham E. (5 August 2016). "History and drivers of plant taxonomy in South Africa". Phytotaxa. 269 (3): 193. doi:10.11646/phytotaxa.269.3.3. hdl:2263/56624.
