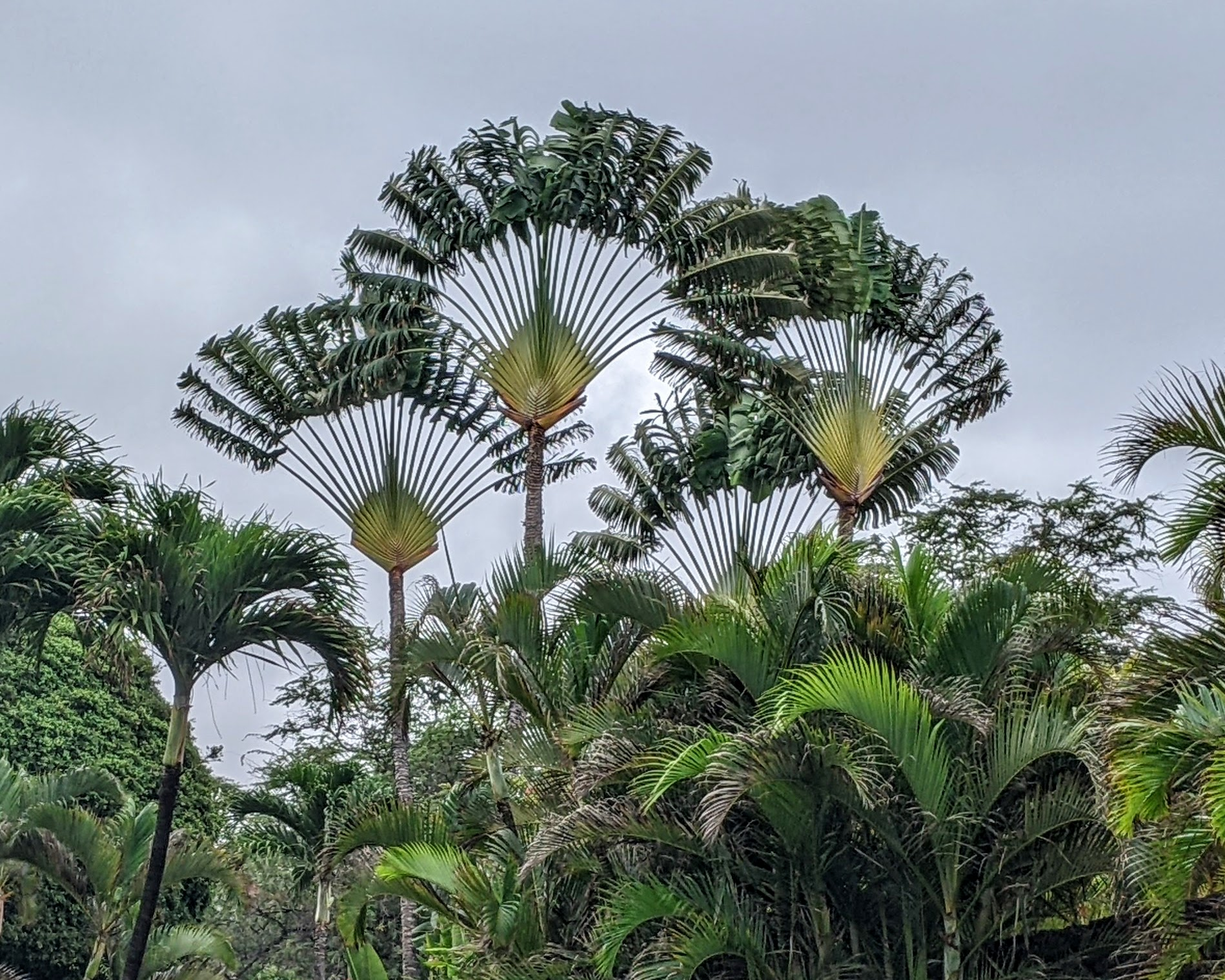
- Ravenala madagascariensis

Scientific classification
- Kingdom: Plantae
- Clade: Embryophytes
- Clade: Tracheophytes
- Clade: Angiosperms
- Clade: Monocots
- Clade: Commelinids
- Order: Zingiberales
- Family: Strelitziaceae
- Genus: Ravenala; Adans.

Synonyms
- Urania Schreb

= Ravenala =

Genus of trees

Ravenala is a genus of monocotyledonous flowering plants in the Strelitziaceae plant family. Classically, the genus was considered to include a single species, Ravenala madagascariensis from Madagascar.

== Taxonomy ==
Species of the genus Ravenala are not true palms (family Arecaceae) but members of the family Strelitziaceae. The genus is closely related to the southern African genus Strelitzia and the South American genus Phenakospermum. Some older classifications include these genera in the banana family (Musaceae).

=== Etymology ===
The scientific name Ravenala comes from Malagasy ravinala or ravina ala meaning "forest leaves".

=== Species ===
Although formerly considered to be monotypic, four different forms have been distinguished. Five new species were described in 2021, all from Madagascar. The following species are currently recognised in the genus Ravenala:

- Ravenala agatheae Haev. & Razanats.
- Ravenala blancii Haev., Jeannoda & Hladik
- Ravenala grandis Haev., Razanats., Hladik & P.Blanc
- Ravenala hladikorum Haev., Razanats., Jeannoda & P.Blanc
- Ravenala madagascariensis Sonn.
- Ravenala menahirana Haev. & Razanats.
