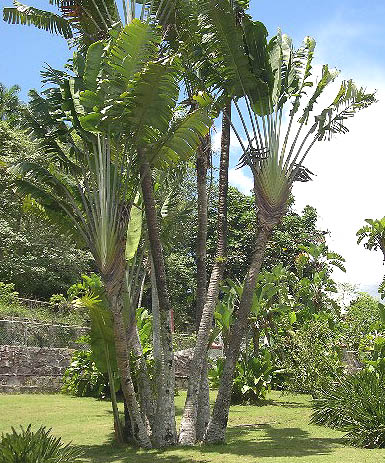
- Ravenala madagascariensis

Scientific classification
- Kingdom: Plantae
- Clade: Tracheophytes
- Clade: Angiosperms
- Clade: Monocots
- Clade: Commelinids
- Order: Zingiberales
- Family: Strelitziaceae; Hutch.

Type genus
- Strelitzia Banks

Genera
- Phenakospermum; Ravenala; Strelitzia
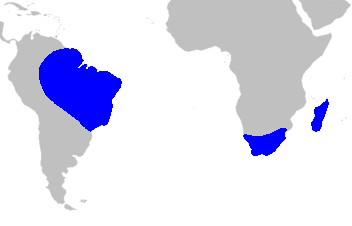
- Strelitziaceae distribution map

= Strelitziaceae =

Family of flowering plants

The Strelitziaceae are a family of monocotyledonous flowering plants, very similar in appearance and growth habit to members of the related families Heliconiaceae and Musaceae (banana family). The three genera with seven species of Strelitziaceae have been included in Musaceae in some classifications, but are generally recognized as a separate family in more recent treatments such as the APG II system (2003). The APG II system assigns the Strelitziaceae to the order Zingiberales in the commelinid clade.

== Taxonomy ==
The Strelitziaceae comprise three genera, all occurring in tropical to subtropical regions: Strelitzia with five species in southern Africa, Ravenala with a single species in Madagascar, and Phenakospermum with a single species in northern South America. The best-known species is the bird-of-paradise flower Strelitzia reginae, grown for its flowers worldwide in tropical and subtropical gardens, and a well-known flower in floristry. The other species of Strelitzia have less colourful flowers and are grown instead for their striking foliage. Also grown for its foliage is the traveller's tree, Ravenala madagascariensis.

- Strelitziaceae
  - - Phenakospermum
    - Strelitzia
  - Ravenala

Image	Genus	Living species
	Strelitzia Ait.	Strelitzia alba (syn. S. augusta) – White bird of paradise; Strelitzia caudata – Mountain strelitzia; Strelitzia nicolai – White or giant bird of paradise; wild banana; blue-and-white strelitzia; Strelitzia reginae (syn. S. parvifolia) – Strelitzia, bird of paradise, or crane lily; Strelitzia juncea (Ker Gawl.) – African desert banana
	Phenakospermum Endl.	Phenakospermum guyannense
	Ravenala Adans.	Ravenala madagascariensis, traveller's tree or traveller's palm

Cladogram: Phylogeny of Zingiberales

- Zingiberales
  - - - Zingiberineae
        - Zingiberariae
          - Zingiberaceae
          - Costaceae
        - Cannariae
          - Cannaceae
          - Marantaceae
      - - Strelitziineae
          - Lowiaceae
          - Strelitziaceae
        - Heliconiaceae
  - - Musaceae

== Bibliography ==
- Sass, C; Iles, WJ; Barrett, CF; Smith, SY; Specht, CD (21 January 2016). "Revisiting the Zingiberales: using multiplexed exon capture to resolve ancient and recent phylogenetic splits in a charismatic plant lineage". PeerJ. 4 e1584. doi:10.7717/peerj.1584. PMC 4727956. PMID 26819846.
