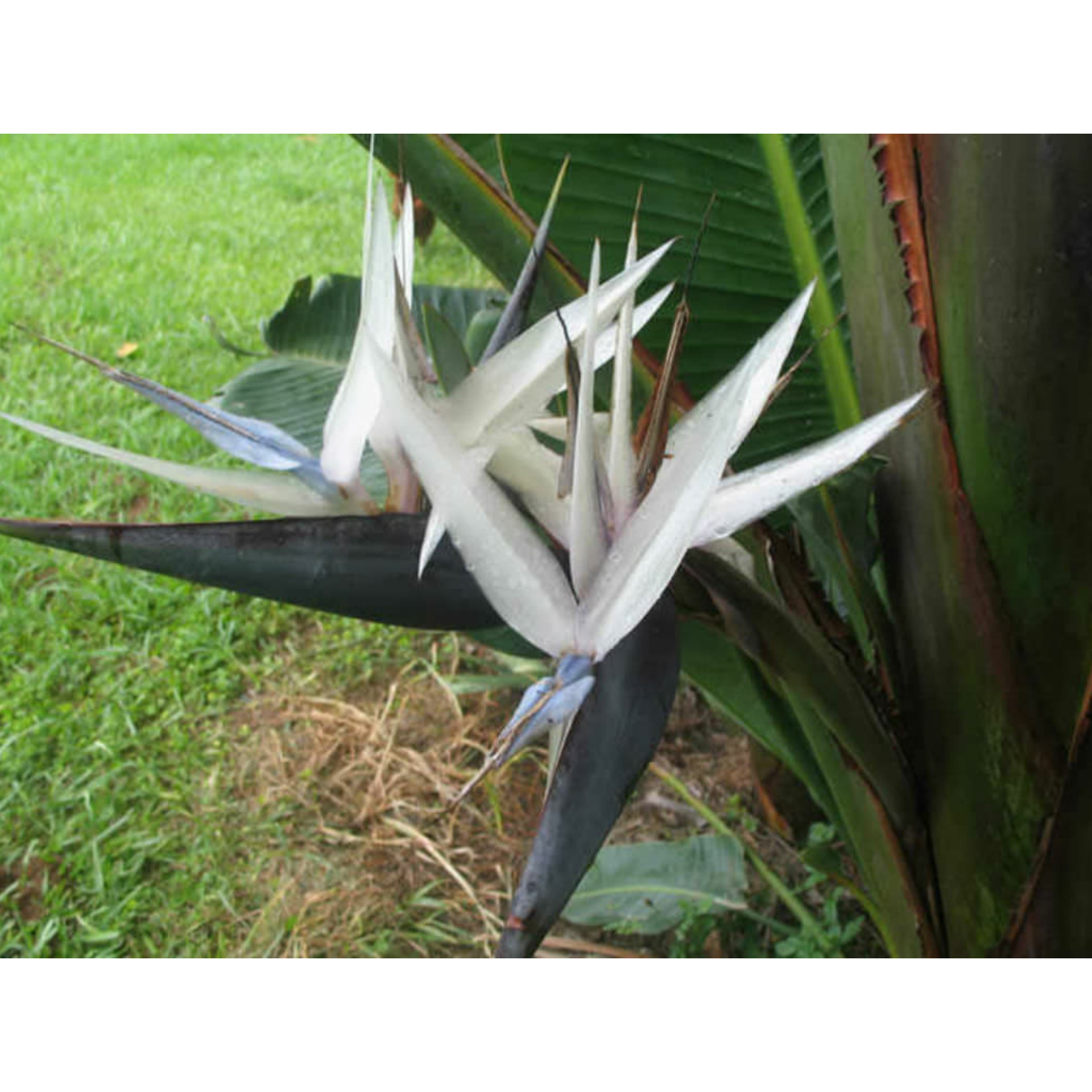

Scientific classification
- Kingdom: Plantae
- Clade: Tracheophytes
- Clade: Angiosperms
- Clade: Monocots
- Clade: Commelinids
- Order: Zingiberales
- Family: Strelitziaceae
- Genus: Strelitzia
- Species: S. caudata

Binomial name
- Strelitzia caudata R.A.Dyer

= Strelitzia caudata =

Mountain strelitzia

Species of flowering plant

Strelitzia caudata, commonly known as the mountain strelitzia or wild banana, is a species of banana-like Strelitzia from Africa from the Chimanimani Mountains of Zimbabwe south to Mozambique, the Northern Provinces of South Africa and Eswatini (Swaziland). It is one of three large banana-like Strelitzia species, all of which are native to southern Africa, the other two being S. alba and S. nicolai.

== Description ==
Growing up to 8 metres tall, it has a leafless woody stem and has a fan shaped crown. The leaves are 2 by 0.6m, greyish-green in colour and are arranged in two vertical ranks. The seeds are black with a tuft of bright orange hairs.

== Taxonomy ==
Strelitzia caudata was first described in 1946 by Robert Allen Dyer in Flowering Plants of Africa, Volume 25, Plate 997. The specific epithet caudata means "with a slender tail"; this refers to an appendage of a sepal, which is prominent in this species.

== Habitat ==
It usually grows in dense clumps, in areas of montane forests and is found between rocks on steep grassy slopes.
