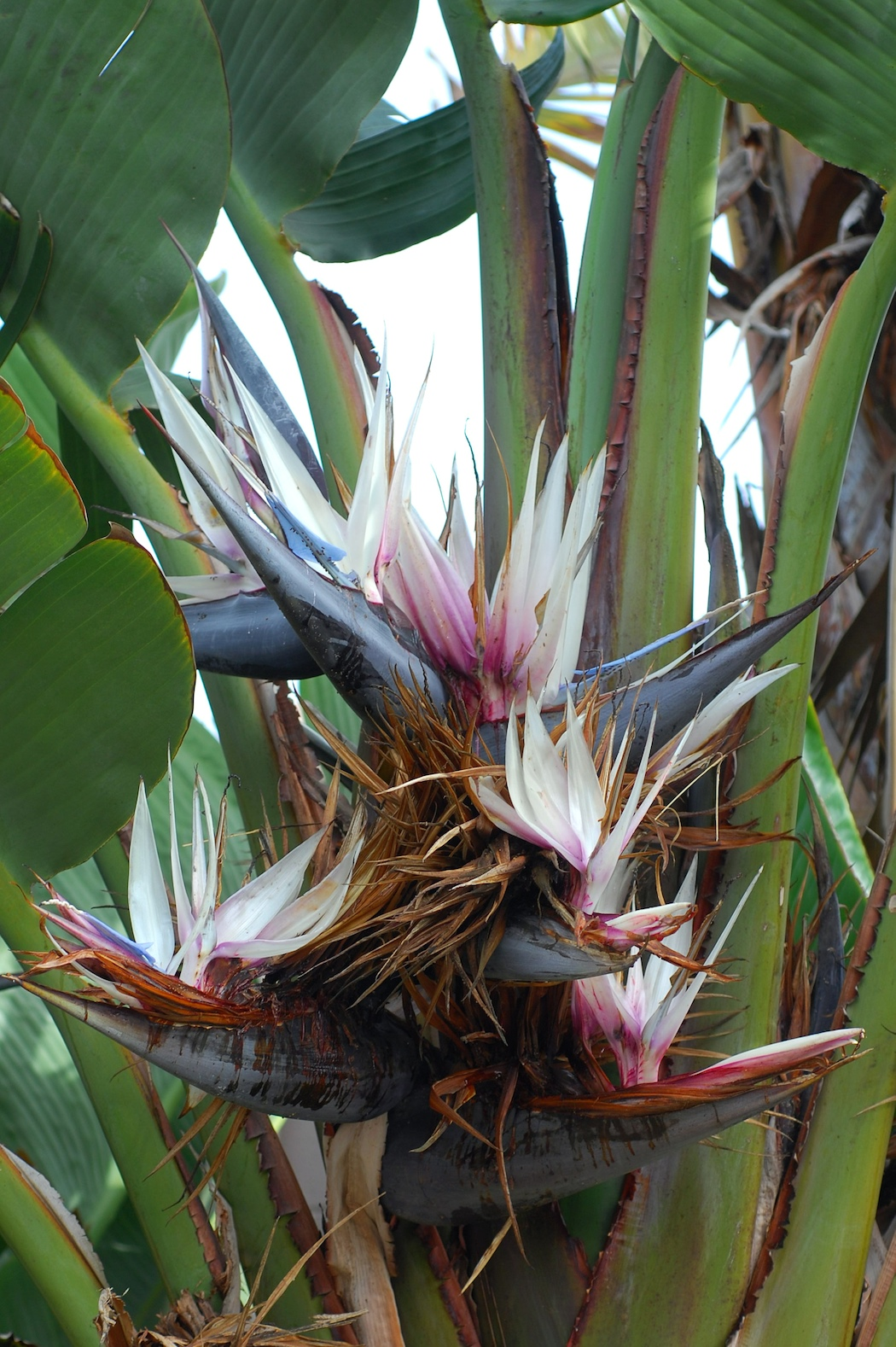

Scientific classification
- Kingdom: Plantae
- Clade: Tracheophytes
- Clade: Angiosperms
- Clade: Monocots
- Clade: Commelinids
- Order: Zingiberales
- Family: Strelitziaceae
- Genus: Strelitzia
- Species: S. nicolai

Binomial name
- Strelitzia nicolai Regel & Körn.

Synonyms
- Strelitzia alba subsp. nicolai (Regel & Körn) Maire & Weiller; Strelitzia quensonii Lem.

= Strelitzia nicolai =

Species of flowering plant

Strelitzia nicolai, commonly known as the wild banana or giant white bird of paradise, is a species of banana-like plants with erect woody stems reaching a height of 7–8 m (23–26 ft), and the clumps formed can spread as far as 3.5 m (11 ft).

Strelitzia nicolai is among the few plants which have been verified to contain the pigment bilirubin, which is usually found in animals.

== Description ==
The 1.8 m (5 ft 11 in)-long leaves are grey-green and arranged like a fan at the top of the stems, similar to Ravenala madagascariensis. The inflorescence is composed of a dark blue bract, white sepals and a bluish-purple "tongue". The entire flower can be as much as 18 cm (7.1 in) high by 45 cm (18 in) long, and is typically held just above the point where the leaf fan emerges from the stem. Flowers are followed by triangular seed capsules.

== Distribution ==
Strelitzia nicolai is one of three larger Strelitzia species, the other two being tree-like S. caudata and S. alba. S. nicolai is restricted to evergreen coastal forest and thicket of eastern South Africa from the Gonubie northwards to southern Mozambique. It is also considered native to Mozambique, Botswana and Zimbabwe. It is reportedly naturalized in eastern Mexico (State of Veracruz), and Australia, where it has become established in northern New South Wales and Southern Queensland.

== Cultivation ==
Strelitzia nicolai is commonly grown both indoors and outdoors as well, in the case of warmer climates, and where frost does not occur regularly. It grows particularly well in nearly all of Florida (as long as frost is not a threat), from the Atlantic eastern side to the Keys, and north along the Gulf of Mexico. Additionally, it has been noted to do well in the coastal areas of Texas and Louisiana. S. nicolai also has a prominent presence along the American West Coast, mostly the coastal regions of California; they can be observed thriving in and around the San Francisco Bay area and regions further south, through the counties of Monterey, San Luis Obispo, Santa Barbara, Ventura, Los Ángeles, Orange, and San Diego, all the way to the southern tip of Cabo San Lucas, Baja California Del Sur, México.

It prefers rich, acidic and evenly moist soils with good drainage, in full sun to part shade. However, they will thrive equally well in areas of lower rainfall, provided the area is coastal or gets a decent marine layer throughout the year. These same such areas may also have drier, sandier, or more hard clay soils, with alkaline conditions (such as those found in Southern California); nonetheless, the plant tends to adapt quickly, becoming large and matured specimens. The amount of light is vital for growth, as well as the plant relying on sunlight for adequate flower production. Some specimens can grow in excess of 20 feet high by 10 feet across.

Propagation is done via division of clumps, by cuttings of offsets; less often from seed. Plants require many years of growth before they begin blooming. In favourable conditions they self-seed freely, and their invasive root systems are best kept away from buildings.

== Gallery ==
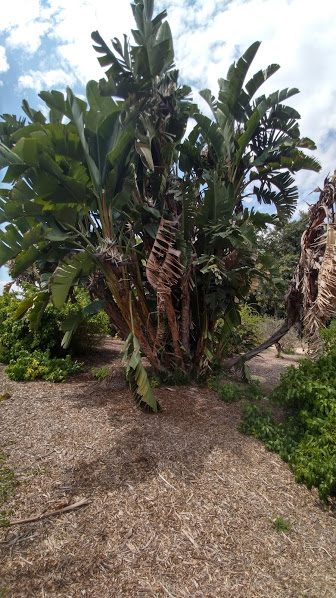

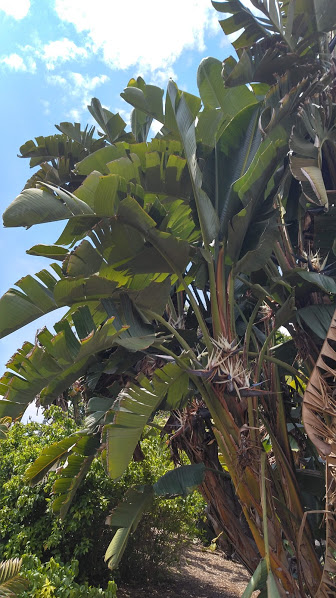

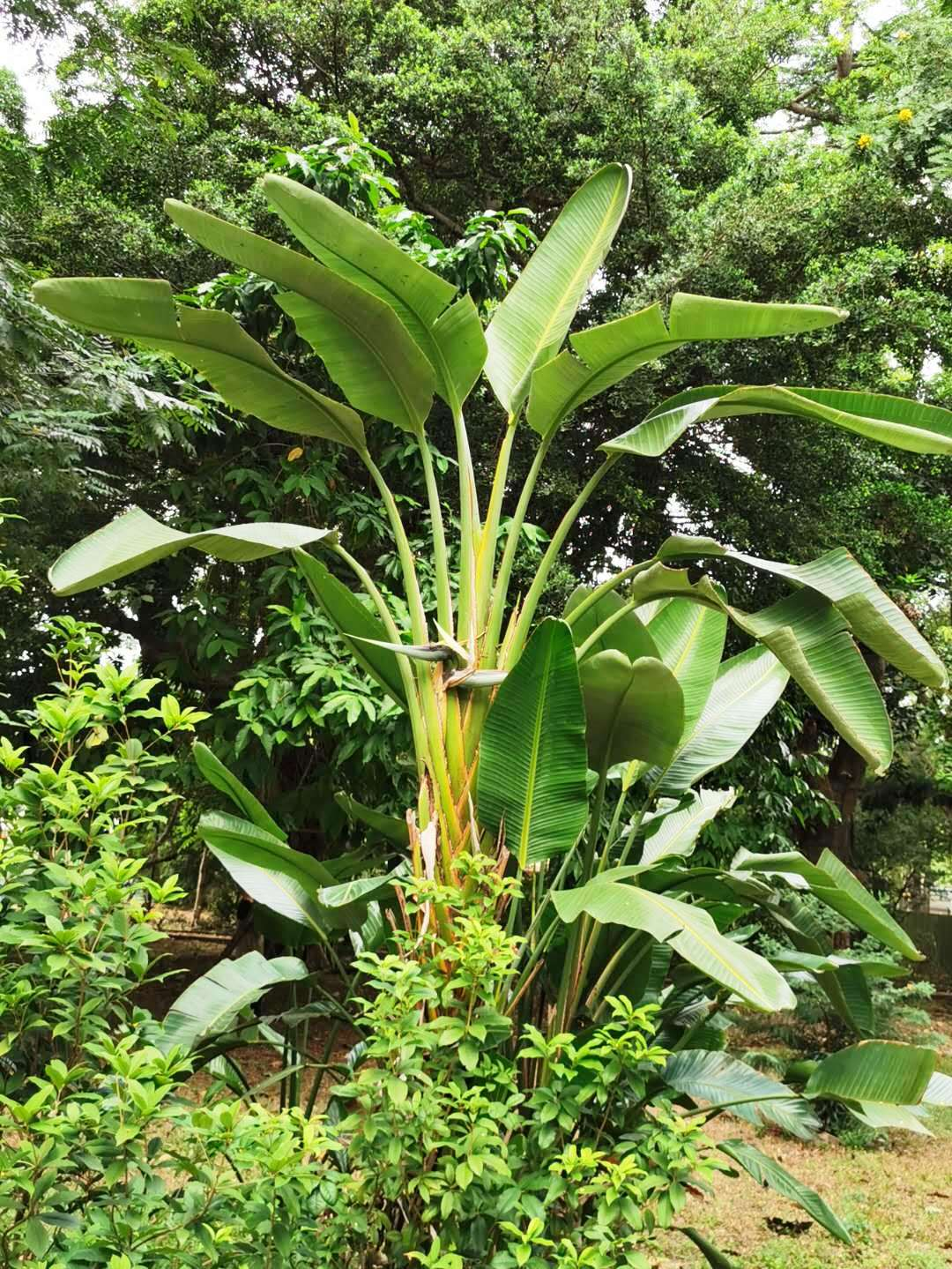

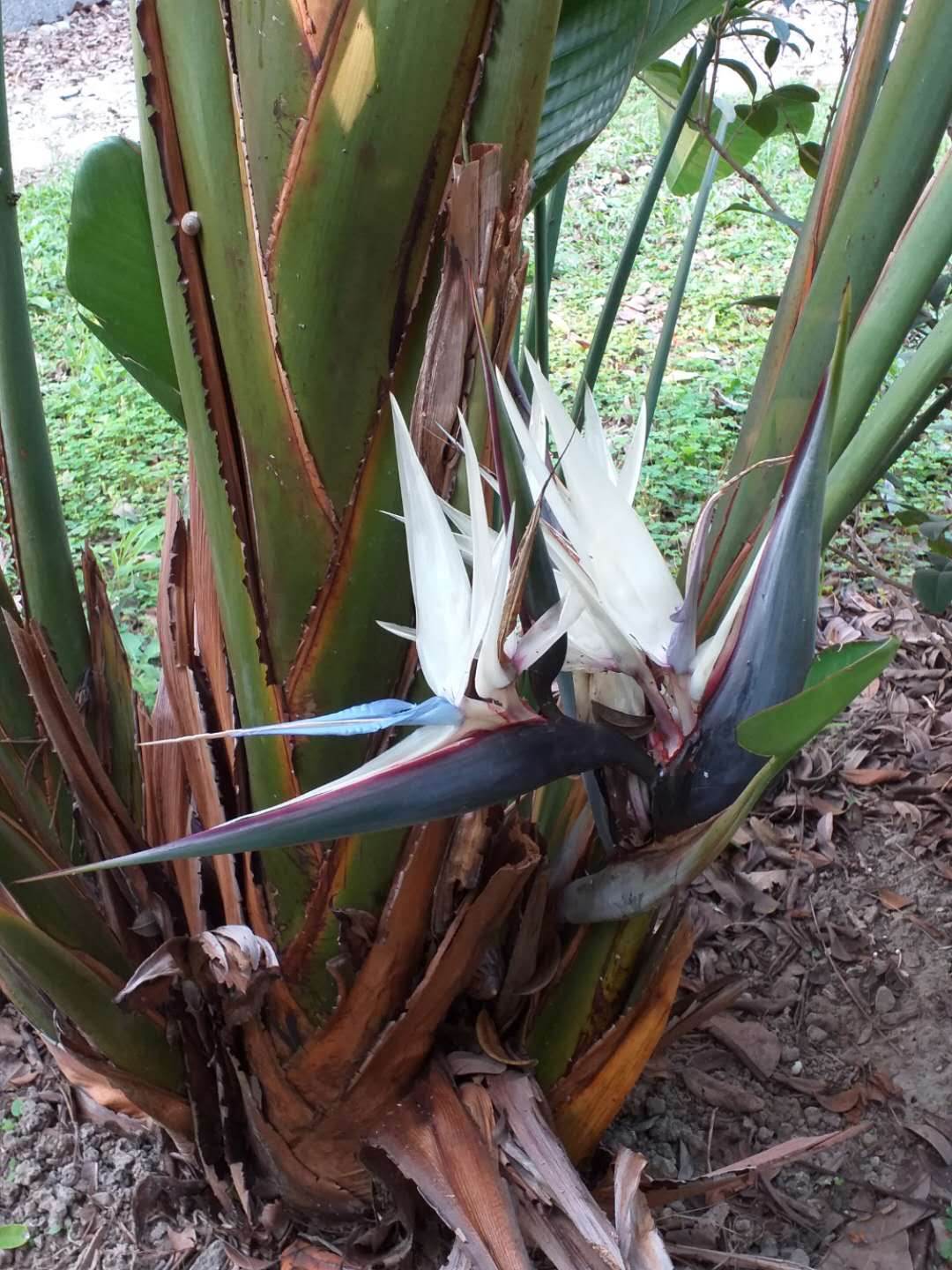

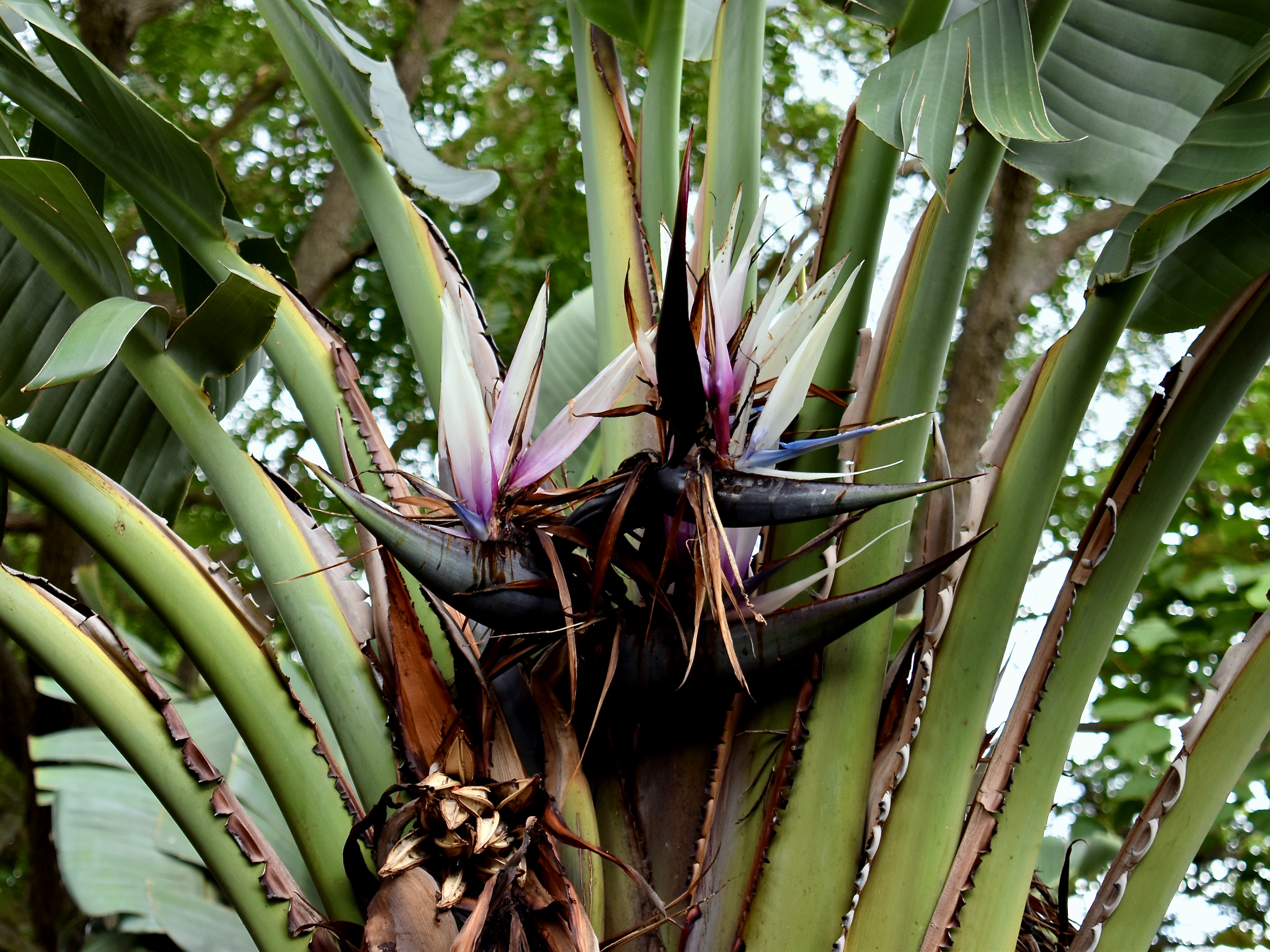

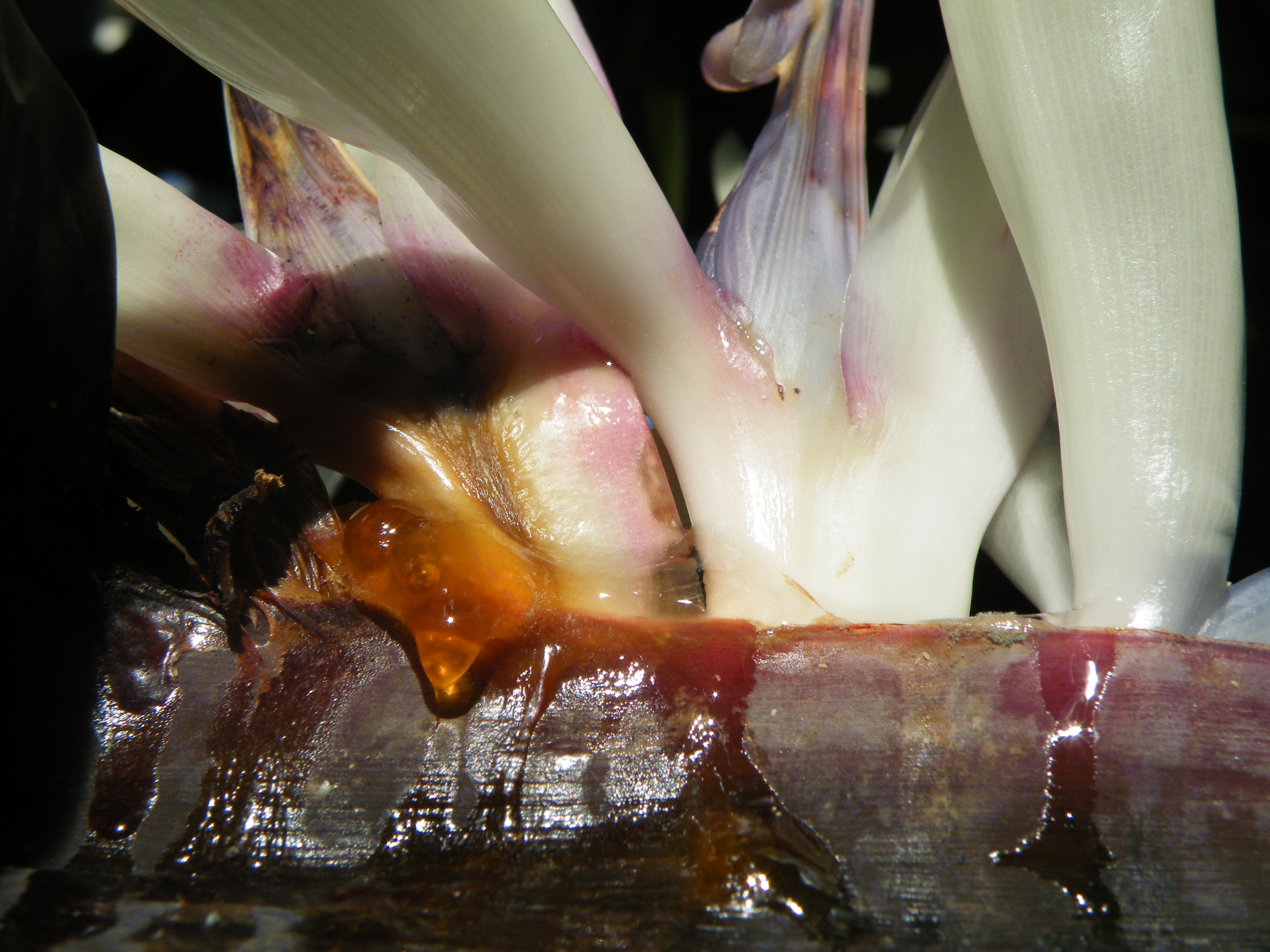

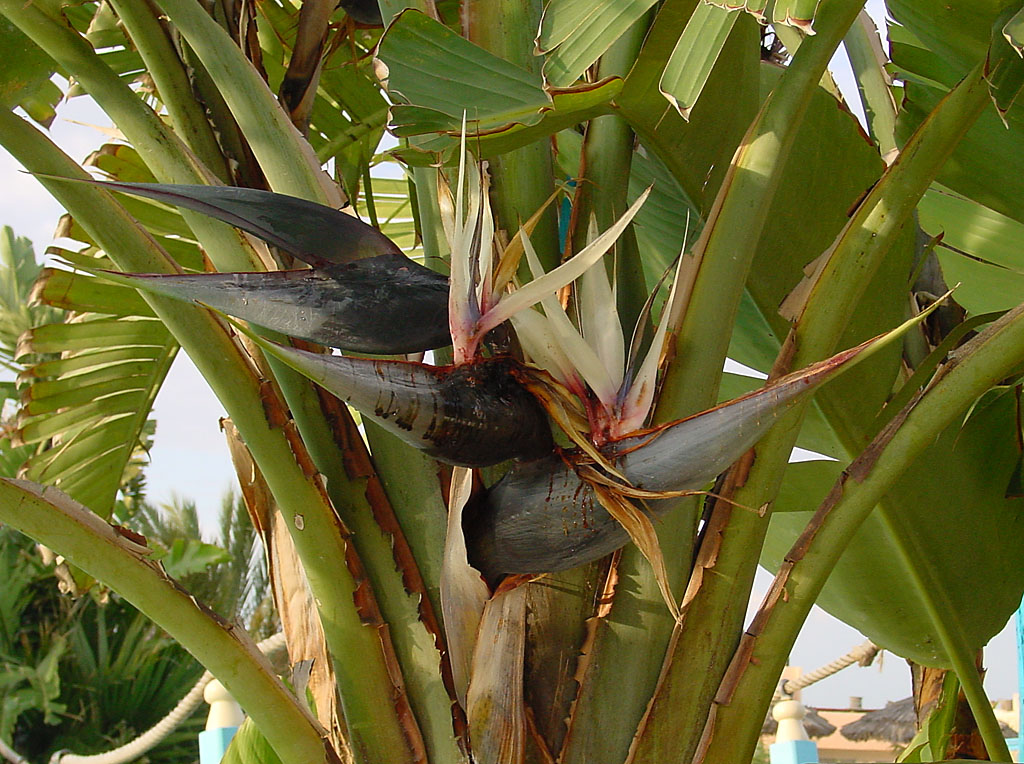

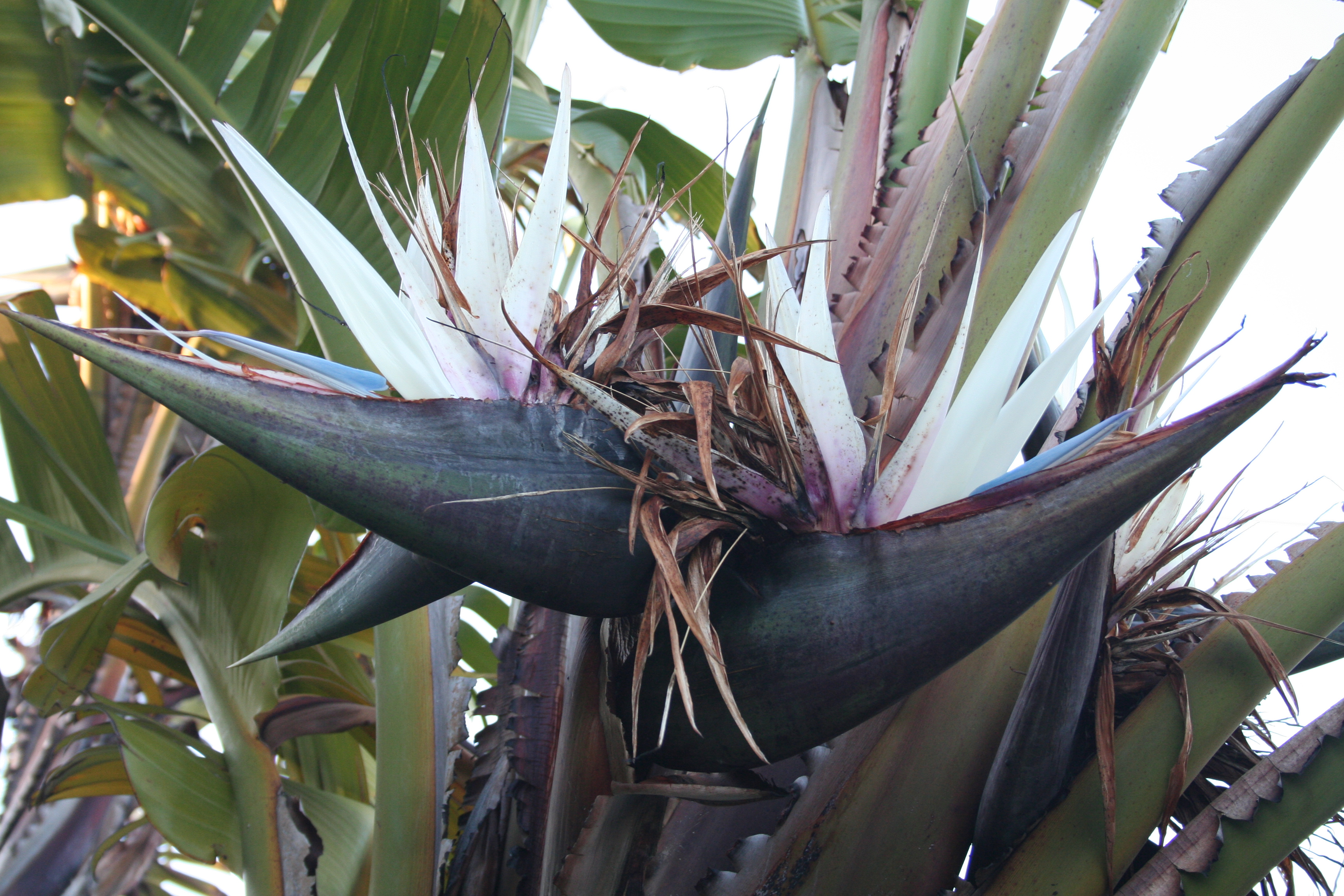

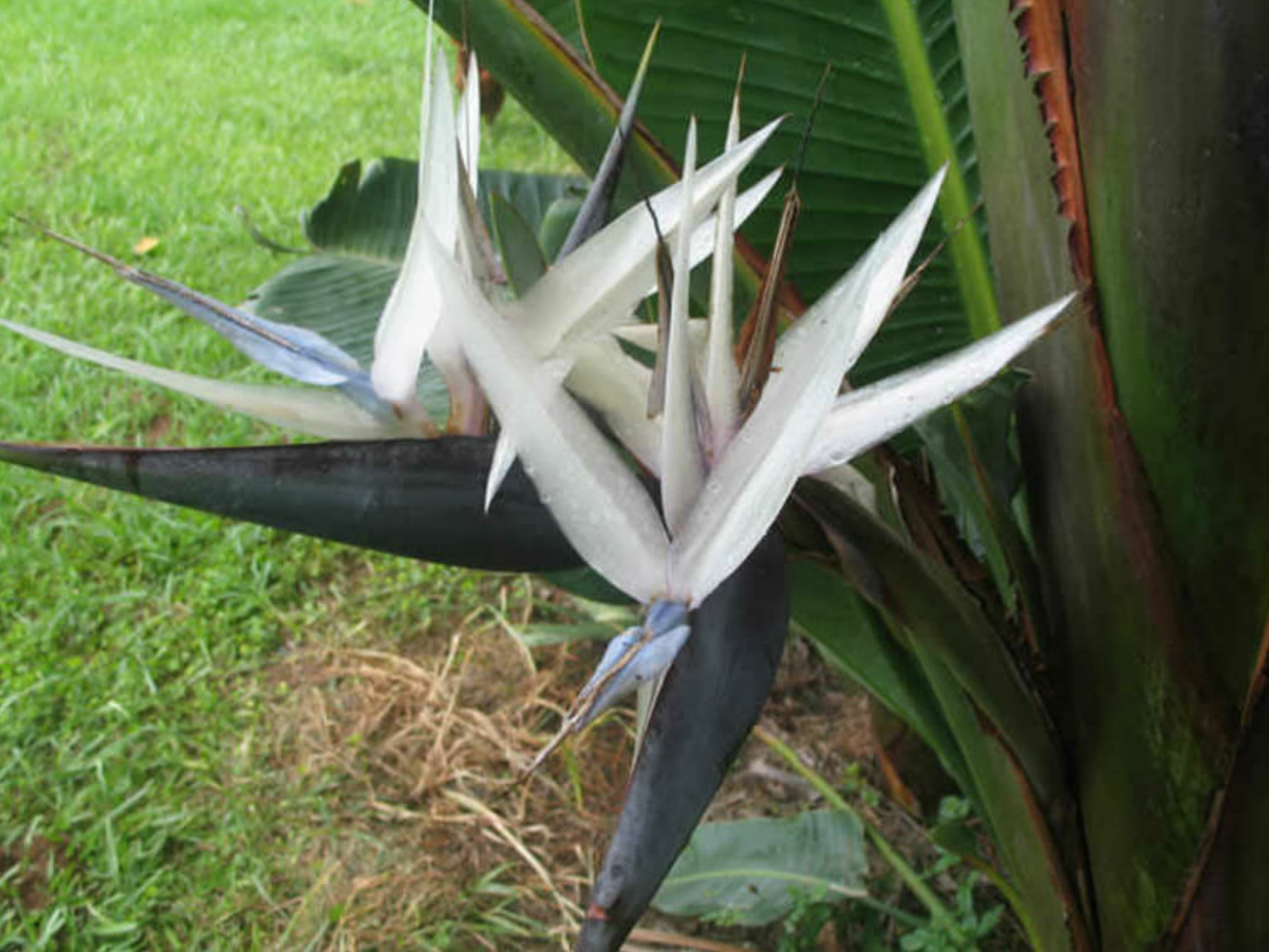

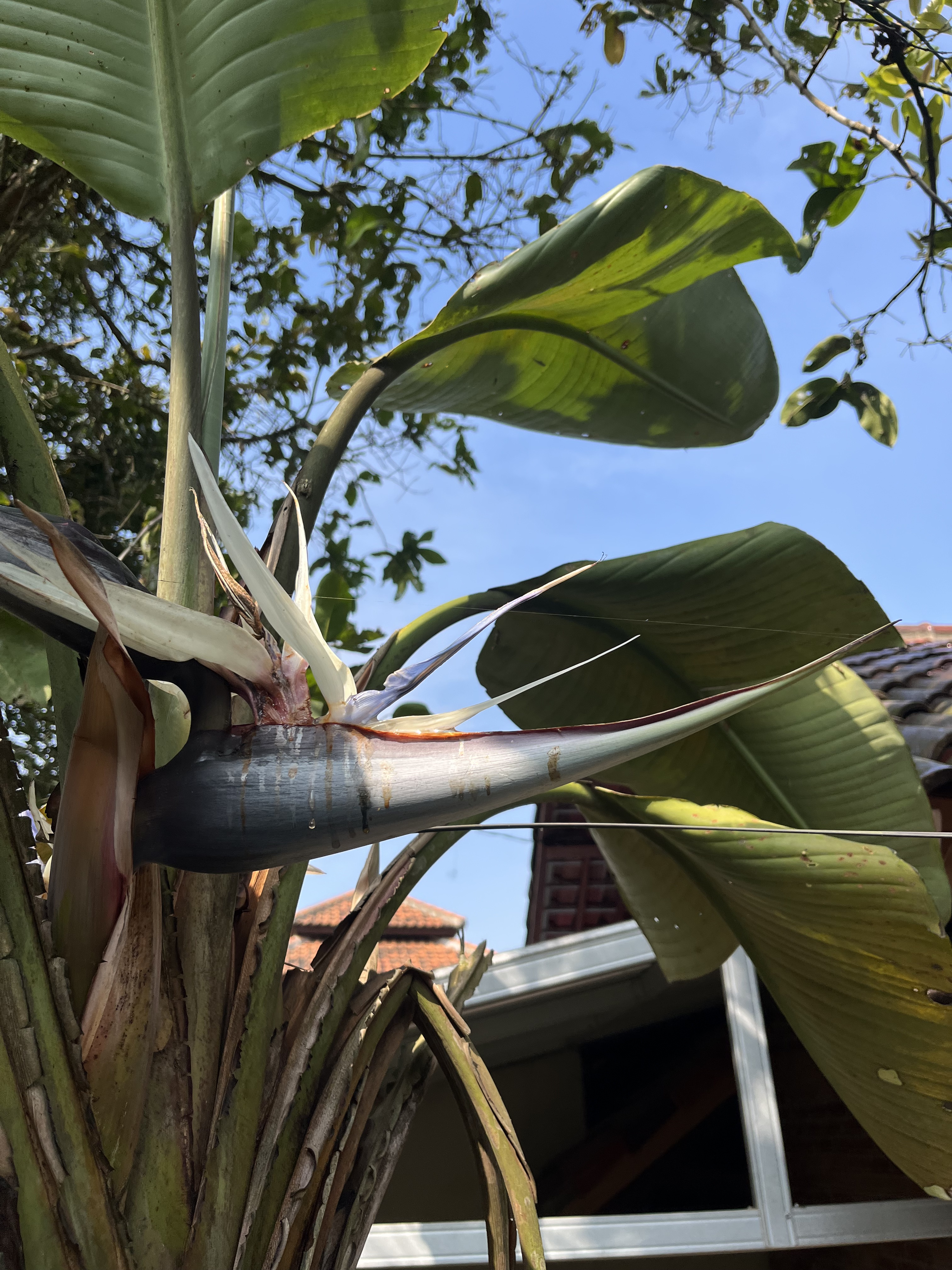
