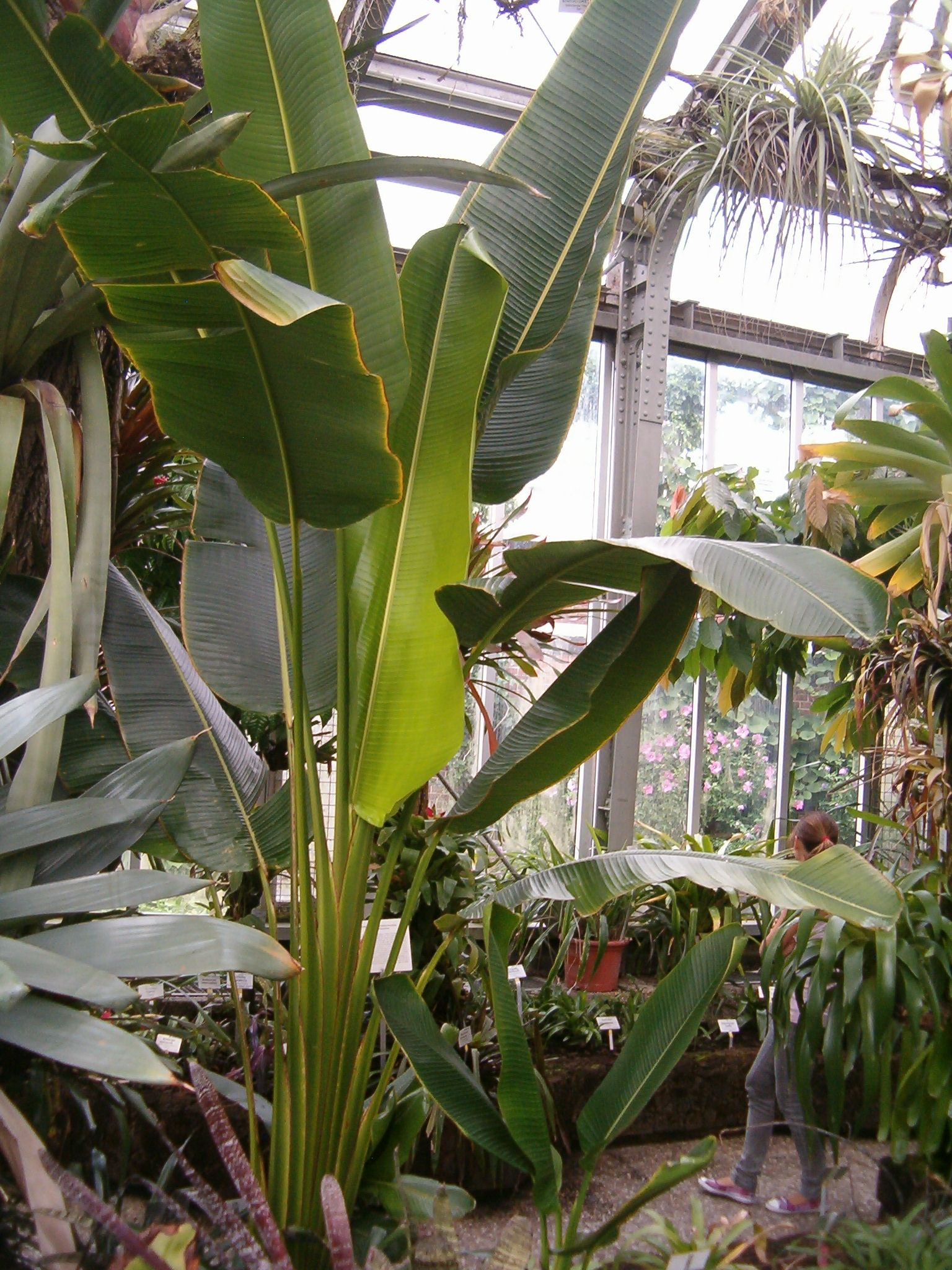
- Phenakospermum guyannense at Berlin-Dahlem Botanical Garden and Botanical Museum.

Scientific classification
- Kingdom: Plantae
- Clade: Tracheophytes
- Clade: Angiosperms
- Clade: Monocots
- Clade: Commelinids
- Order: Zingiberales
- Family: Strelitziaceae
- Genus: Phenakospermum; Endl.
- Species: P. guyannense

Binomial name
- Phenakospermum guyannense (A.Rich.) Endl. ex Miq.

Synonyms
- Musidendron amazonicum (Mart.) Nakai; Phenakospermum amazonicum (Mart.) Miq. Ravenala guyannensis (A.Rich.) Steud. Urania amazonica Mart. Urania guyannensis A.Rich.

= Phenakospermum =

Genus of trees

Phenakospermum is a monotypic genus in the family Strelitziaceae. Only one species is recognized, Phenakospermum guyannense, native to Suriname, French Guiana and the eastern Amazon River basin. This plant grows to over 10 m (33 ft) in height but can be felled with a single blow with a machete.

Although not as prized as the ornamental Traveler's palm (in the same family), P. guyannense is used locally in Brazil as a landscape element. The broad leaves are used to wrap fish in Benevides, Brazil, especially when Calathea leaves (Marantaceae) are not available.

Previously, this genus was included in the now exclusively old world genus Ravenala.
