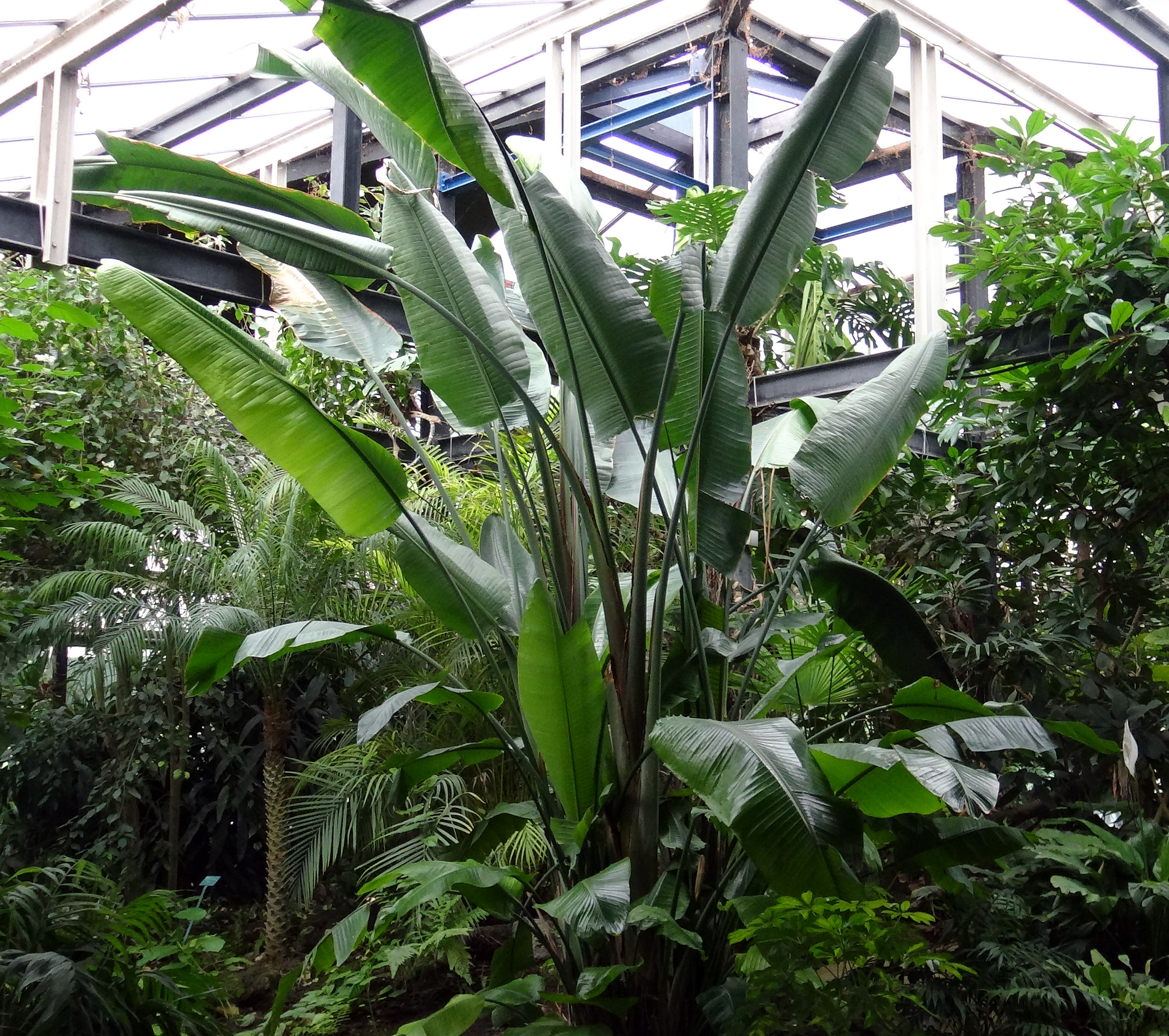

Conservation status
- Least Concern (IUCN 3.1)

Scientific classification
- Kingdom: Plantae
- Clade: Tracheophytes
- Clade: Angiosperms
- Clade: Monocots
- Clade: Commelinids
- Order: Zingiberales
- Family: Strelitziaceae
- Genus: Strelitzia
- Species: S. alba

Binomial name
- Strelitzia alba (L.f.) Skeels

Synonyms
- Heliconia alba L.f.; Heliconia augusta Salisb.; Strelitzia angusta D.Dietr.; Strelitzia augusta Thunb.

= Strelitzia alba =

Species of flowering plant

Strelitzia alba also known as white-flowered wild banana, white bird of paradise, or Cape wild banana is a plant of the Bird of Paradise family and is endemic to the Garden Route along the southernmost coastal regions of the district of Humansdorp Eastern and district of Knysna in Western Cape in South Africa. It grows in evergreen forest, gorges, and on slopes along the rivers.

Strelitzia alba is referred to in the Red List of South African plants as not endangered (Least Concern). Phakamani Xaba of Kirstenbosch Botanical Gardens visited the wild populations several times and came to a different view of the threat status. It has been observed that collectors have removed many of the side shoots required for vegetative propagation, in the populations there are no young plants or seedlings and the seeds are always harvested before they reach the soil.

== Description ==
This frost-sensitive, clump-forming evergreen, perennial, herbaceous, plant can grow to 10m tall, with leaves measuring 2m by 0.6m. The leaves are often tattered by strong winds or hail. As the specific name suggests, the flowers are completely white and lack the blue color found in other species. It forms with its branched rhizomes dense, horstartige stocks. The unbranched, slightly woody trunk has marks through the leaf scars. The leaves are spirally distributed on the trunk, and have long petioles and leaf blades. Their simple, smooth-edged, elongated, about leathery, shiny green to greyish leaf blades have a length of up to 2 meters and a width of 40 to 60 centimeters. The leaf blades rip in the wind over time. The clean trunk bears the scars of old leaf-bases.

Flowering may take place at any time of the year, but is usually between July and December. It has, like Strelitzia caudata, a simple inflorescence (in contrast to Strelitzia nicolai in which several partial inflorescences are on top of each other). The 30 cm long boat-shaped bract encloses from five to ten flowers which emerge in sequence. The hermaphrodite flowers are zygomorphic and threefold. The three bracts are very different in shape and color in the two circles.

The fruit is a woody capsule, splitting into three lobes to reveal black to brown, spherical seeds with a yellow/orange tufty aril. Fruits can be present throughout the year, but they most often ripen in the summer between October and February in the southern hemisphere. Strelitzia alba is the only species in its genus with a set of 2n = 22 chromosomes. The other Strelitzia species have a set of 2n = 14.

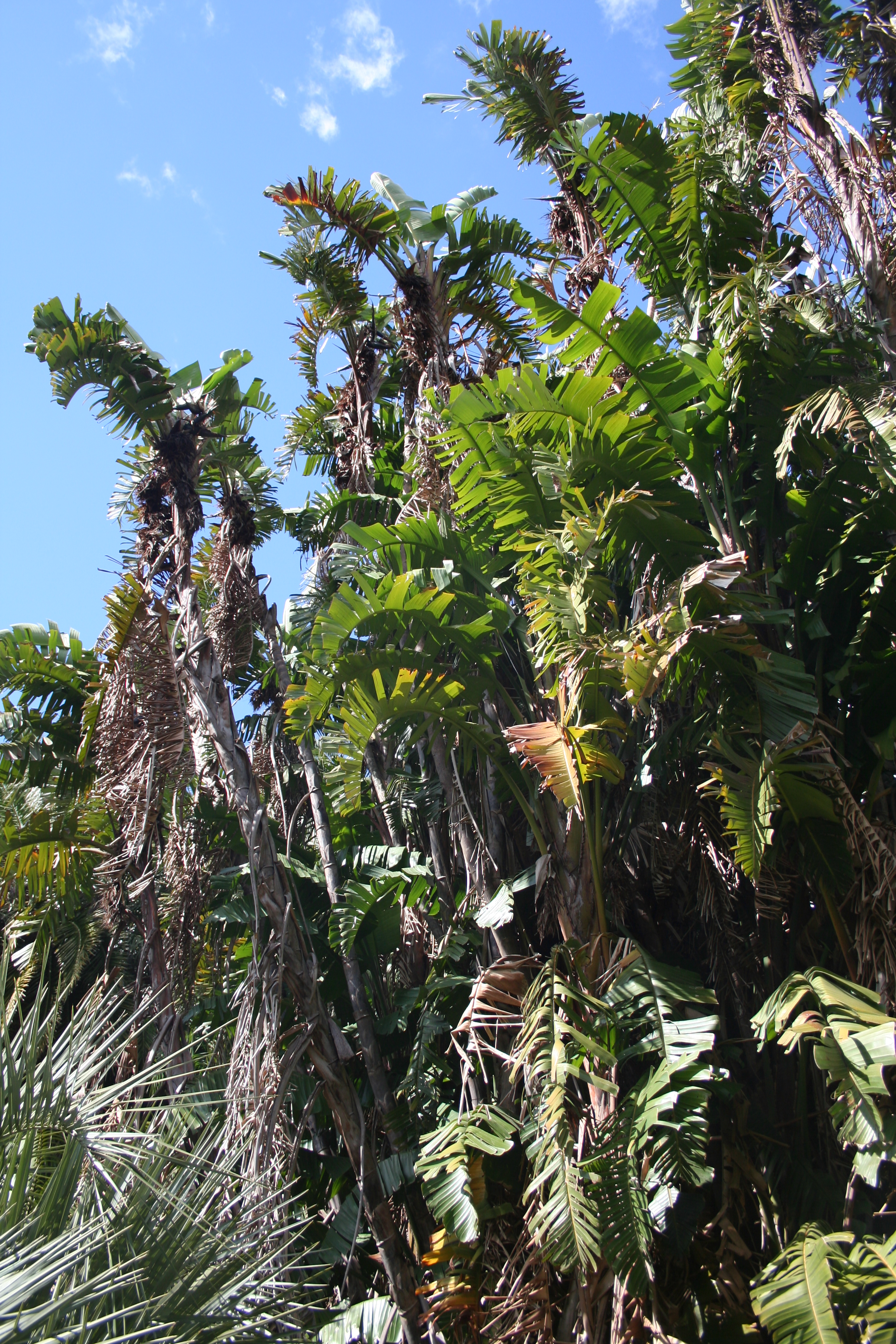
Mature Plant

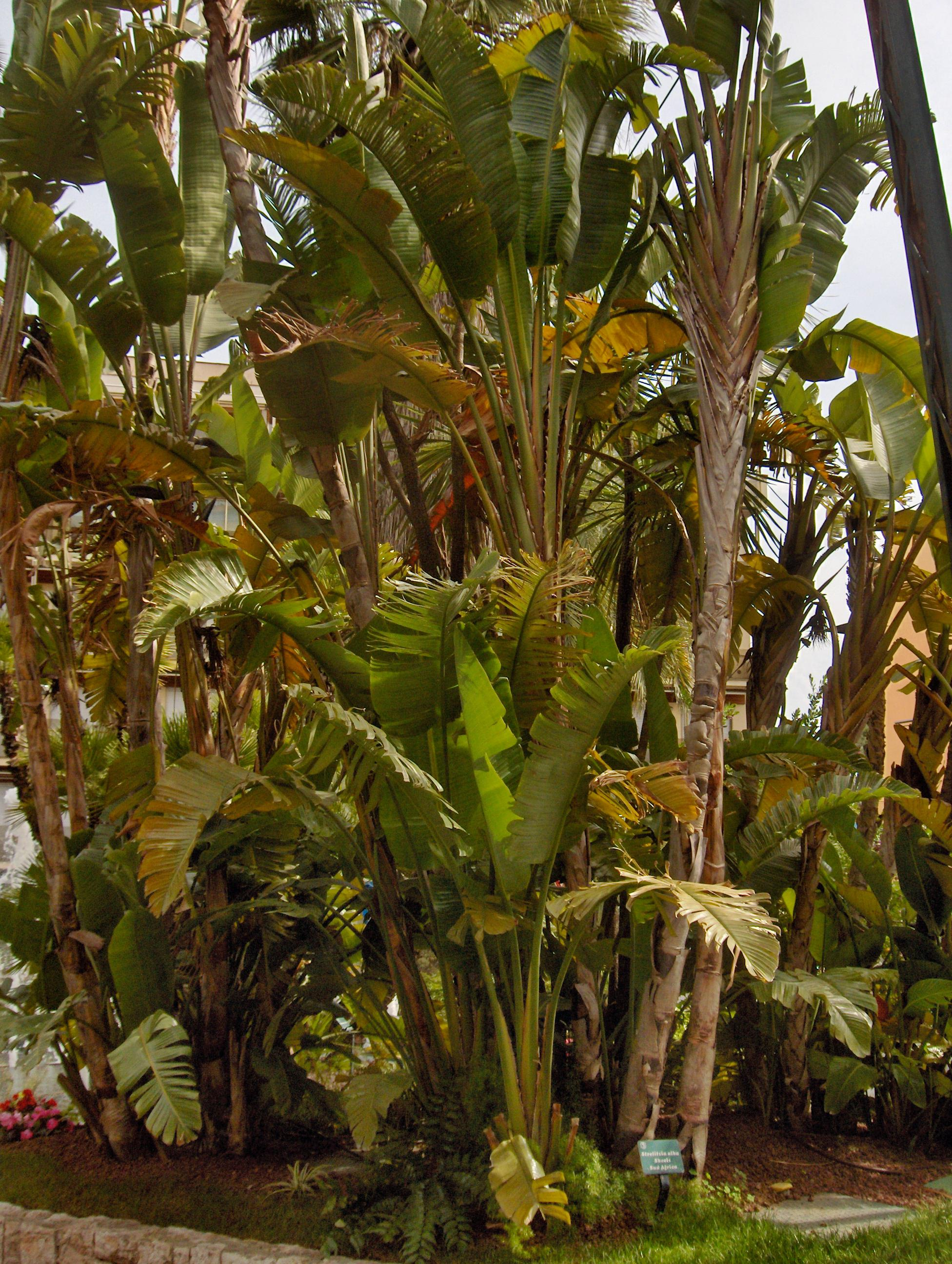
Plant

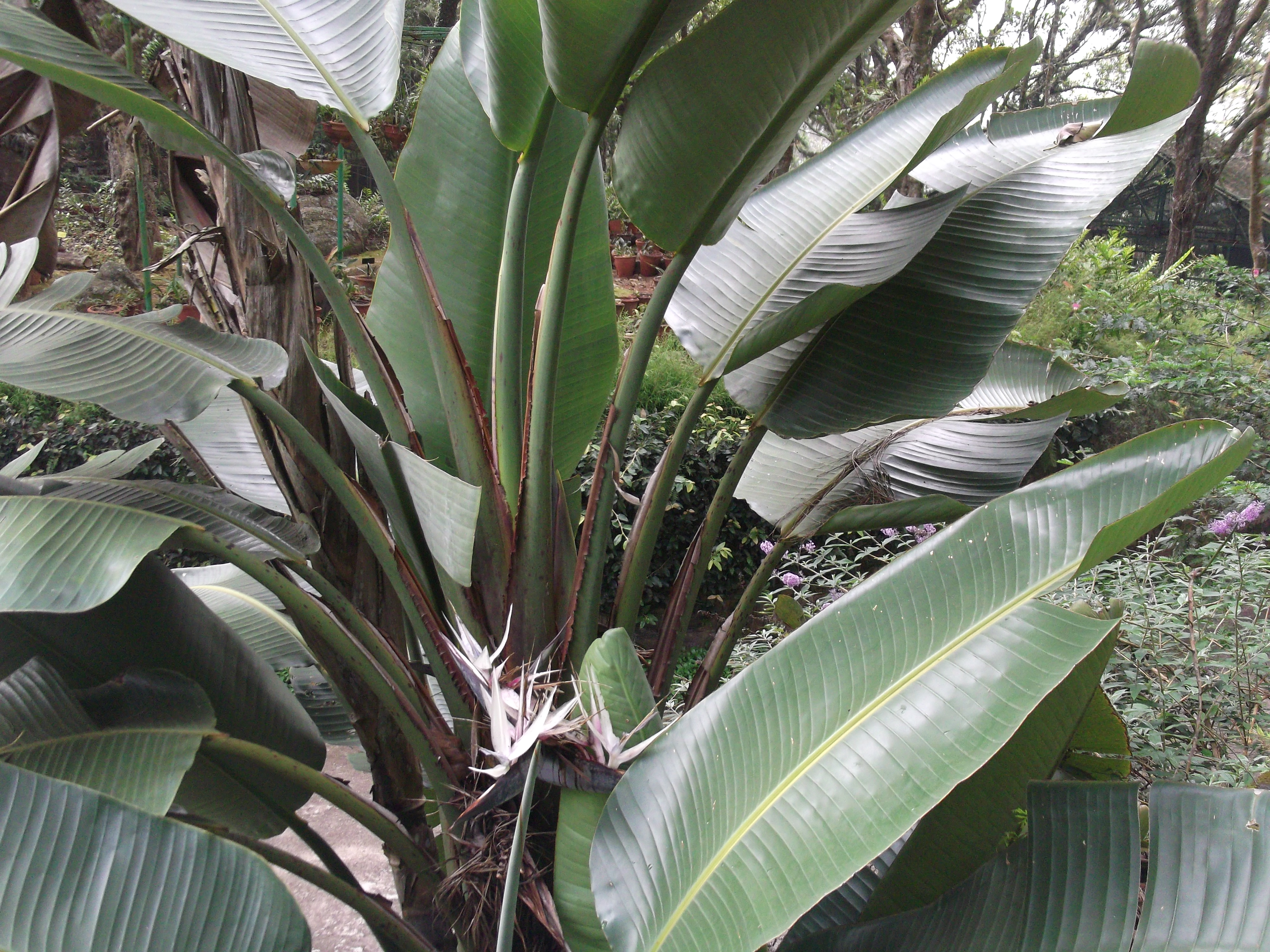
Leaves

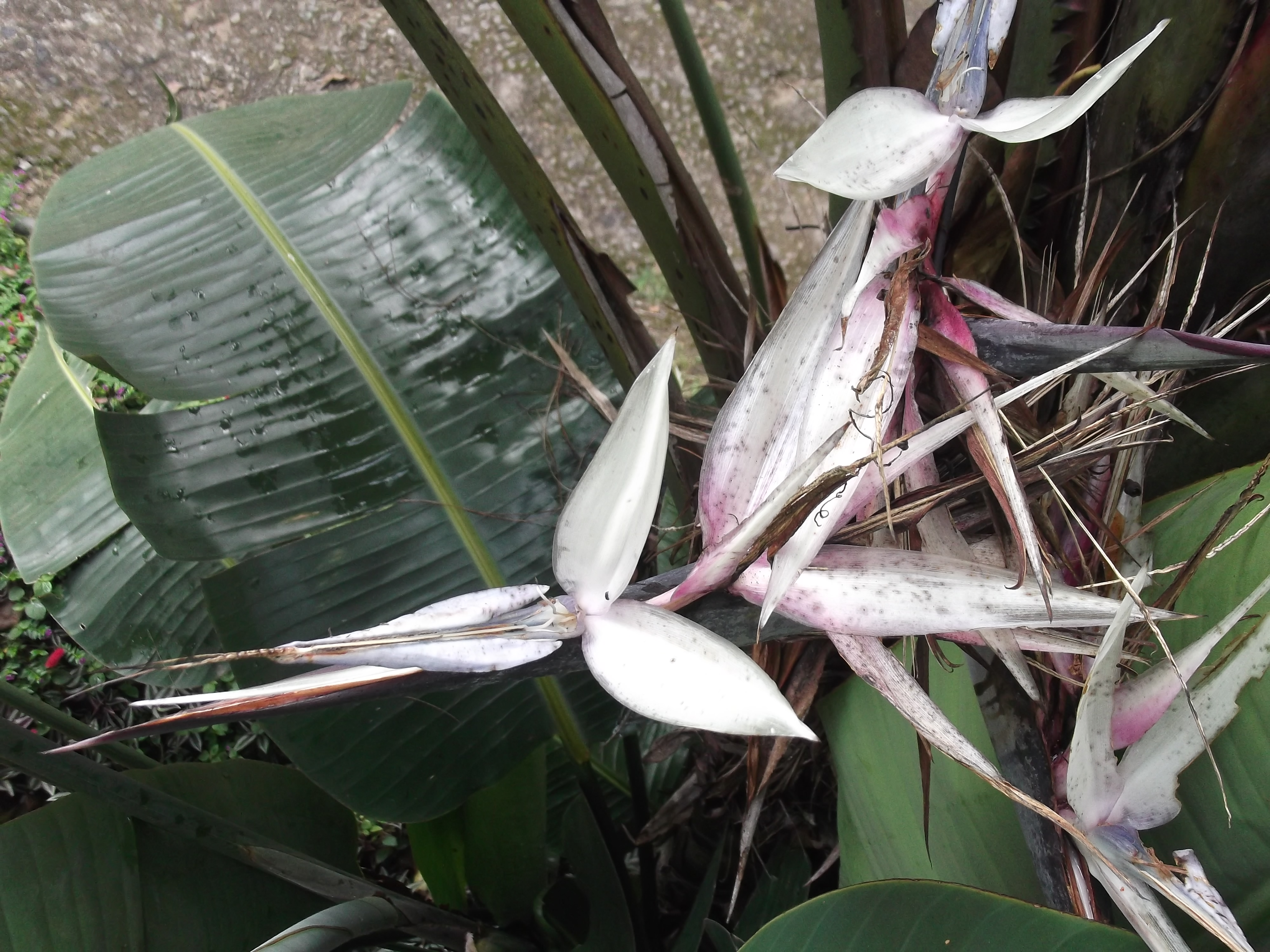
Flowers from Above

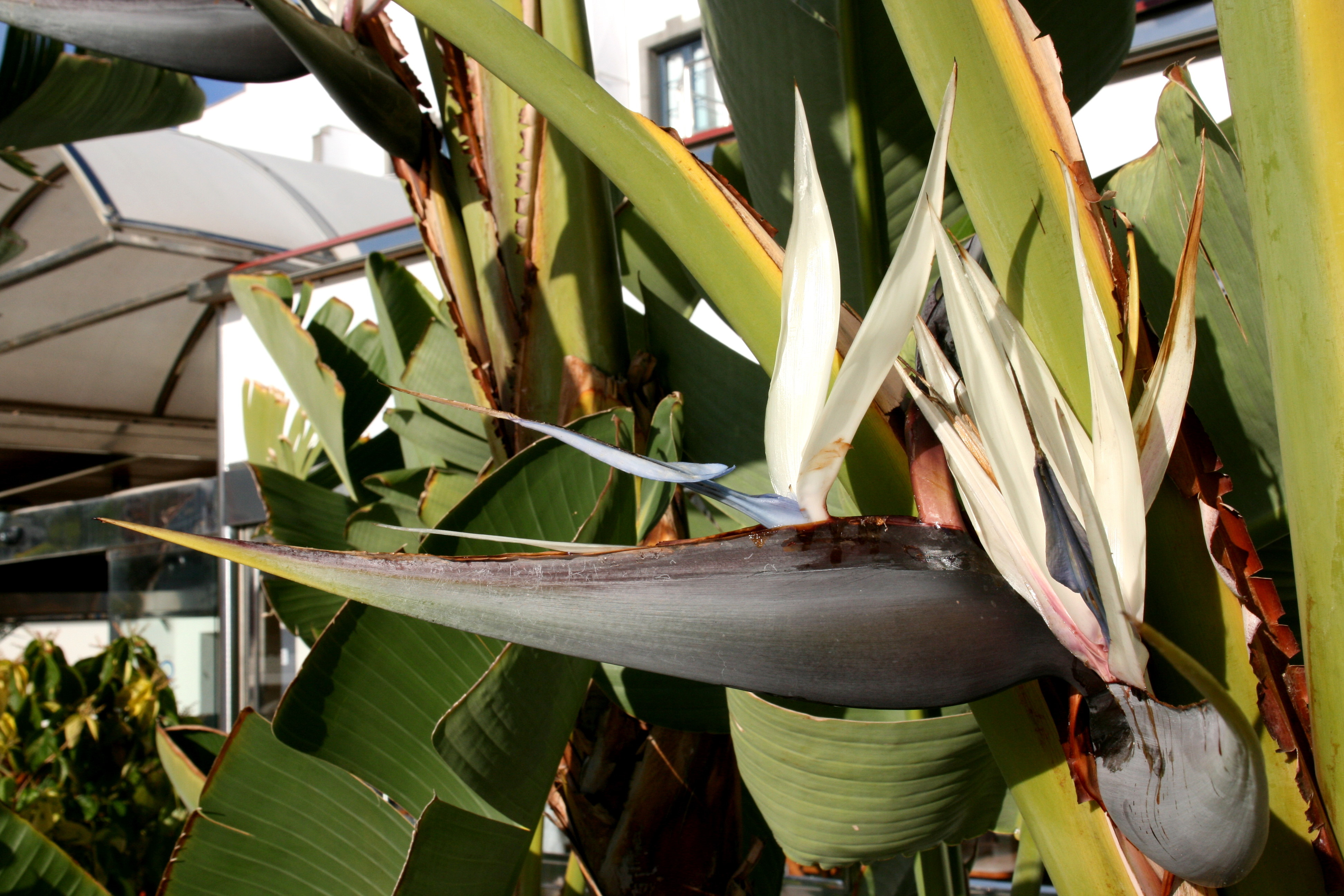
Flowers

== Systematics ==
This species was first published in 1782 under the name Heliconia alba by Carl Linnaeus the Younger in Supplementum Plantarum, p. 157 The Swedish botanist Thunberg, who placed it in the genus Strelitzia as Strelitzia augusta in Nov. Gen. Pl.: 113, based on a species found in the neighborhood of the Piesang River at Plettenberg Bay – 'piesang' being Afrikaans for 'banana'. Francis Masson, who was then the Botanical Collector for Kew, introduced it to Europe in 1791. Homer Collar Skeels gave it the name Strelitzia alba in 1912 in the US Department of Agriculture's Bureau of Plant Industry Bulletin, 248, p. 57. The specific epithet alba comes from Latin, meaning white and referring to flowering. In Moore & Hyypio 1970, the nomenclature within the genus Strelitzia was discussed. Another synonym for Strelitzia alba Rule & Körn. Strelitzia angusta D.Dietr.

This is one of three arborescent Strelitzias, the other two being Strelitzia caudata and Strelitzia nicolai.

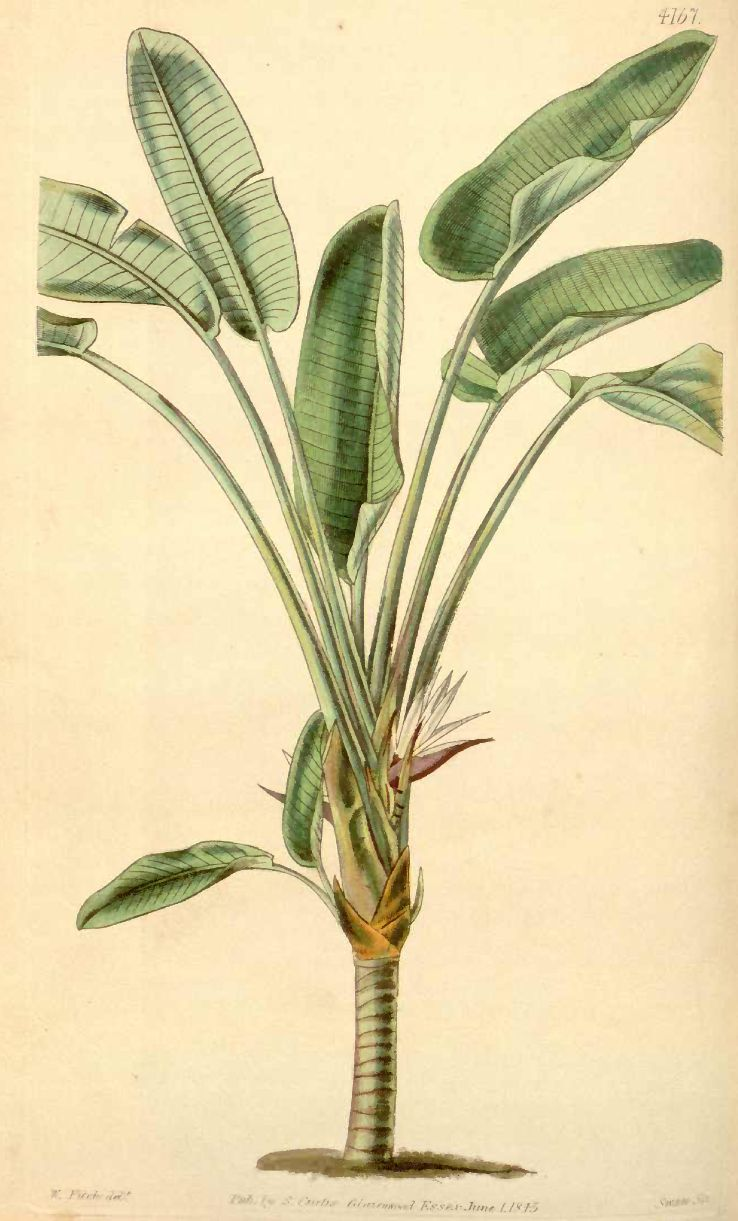
Plate 4167 by Walter Hood Fitch for Curtis's Botanical Magazine, vol. 71 (1845)

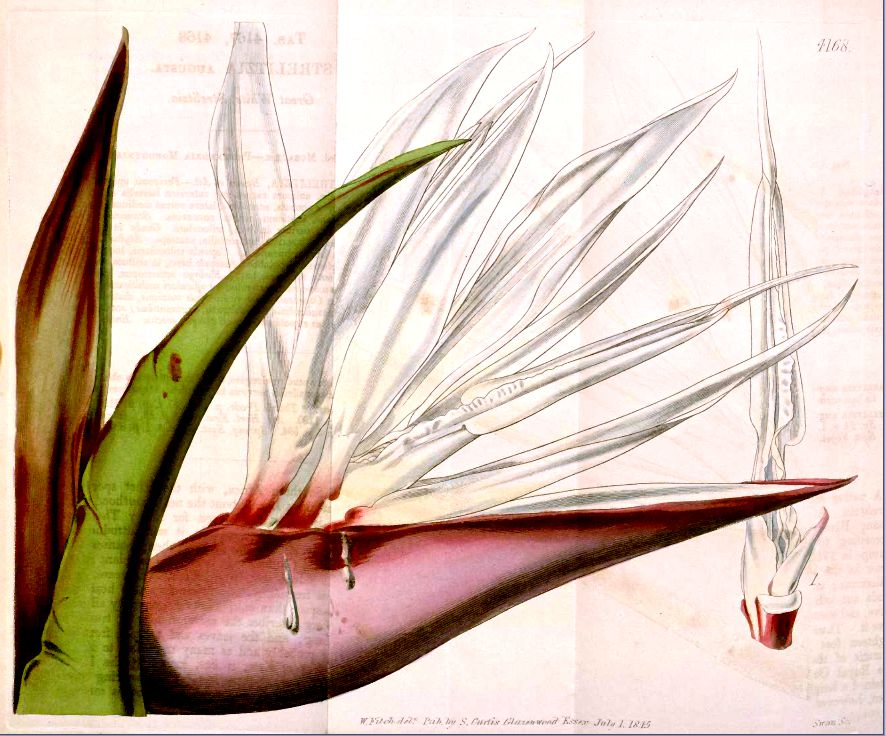
Plate 4168 of Curtis's Botanical Magazine, vol. 71 (1845)

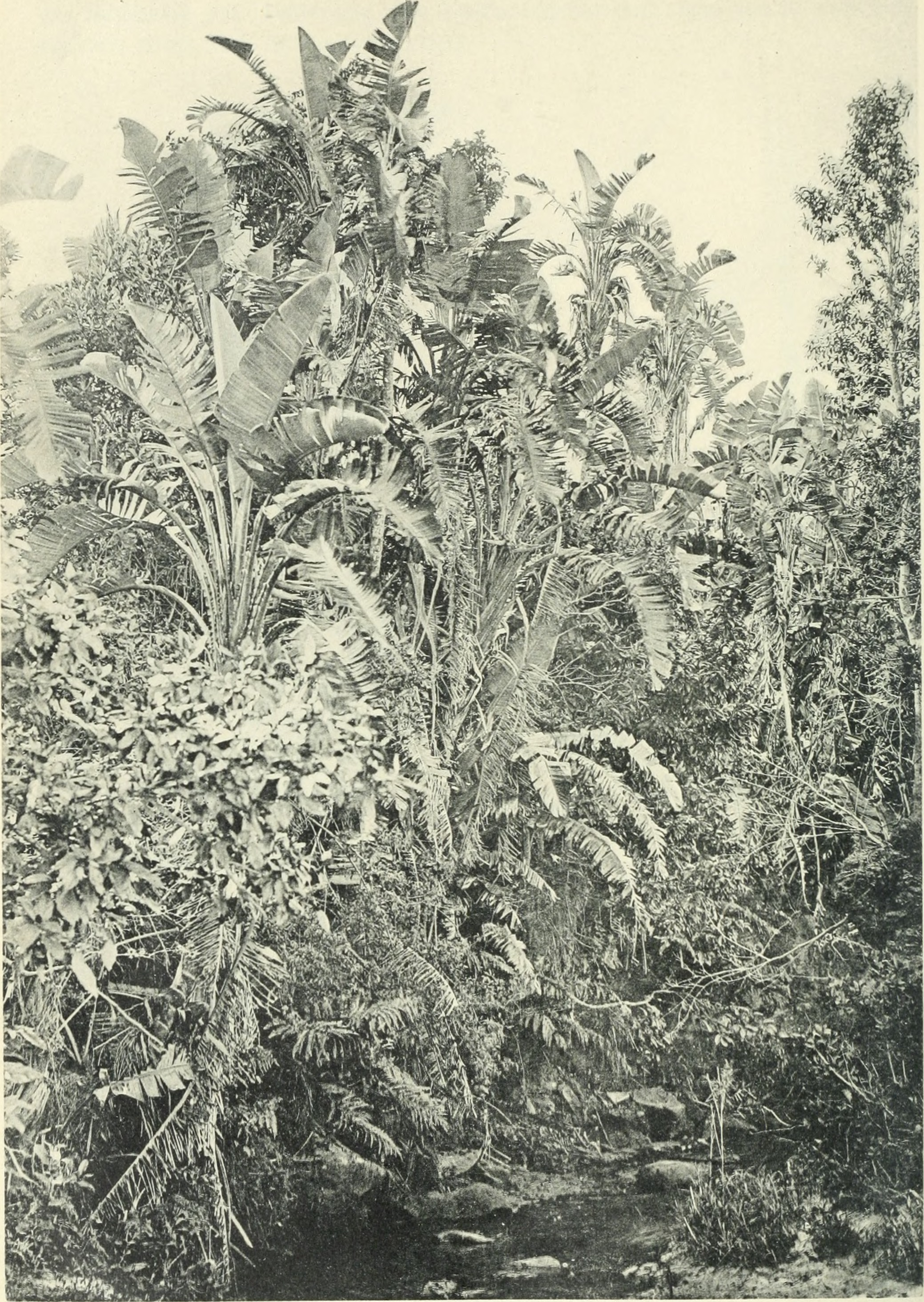
German Botanist Adolf Engler's photo of Strelitzia alba published in Die Pflanzenwelt Afrikas, insbesondere seiner tropischen Gebiete; Grundzüge der Pflanzenverbreitung im Afrika und die Charakterpflanzen Afrikas in 1910
