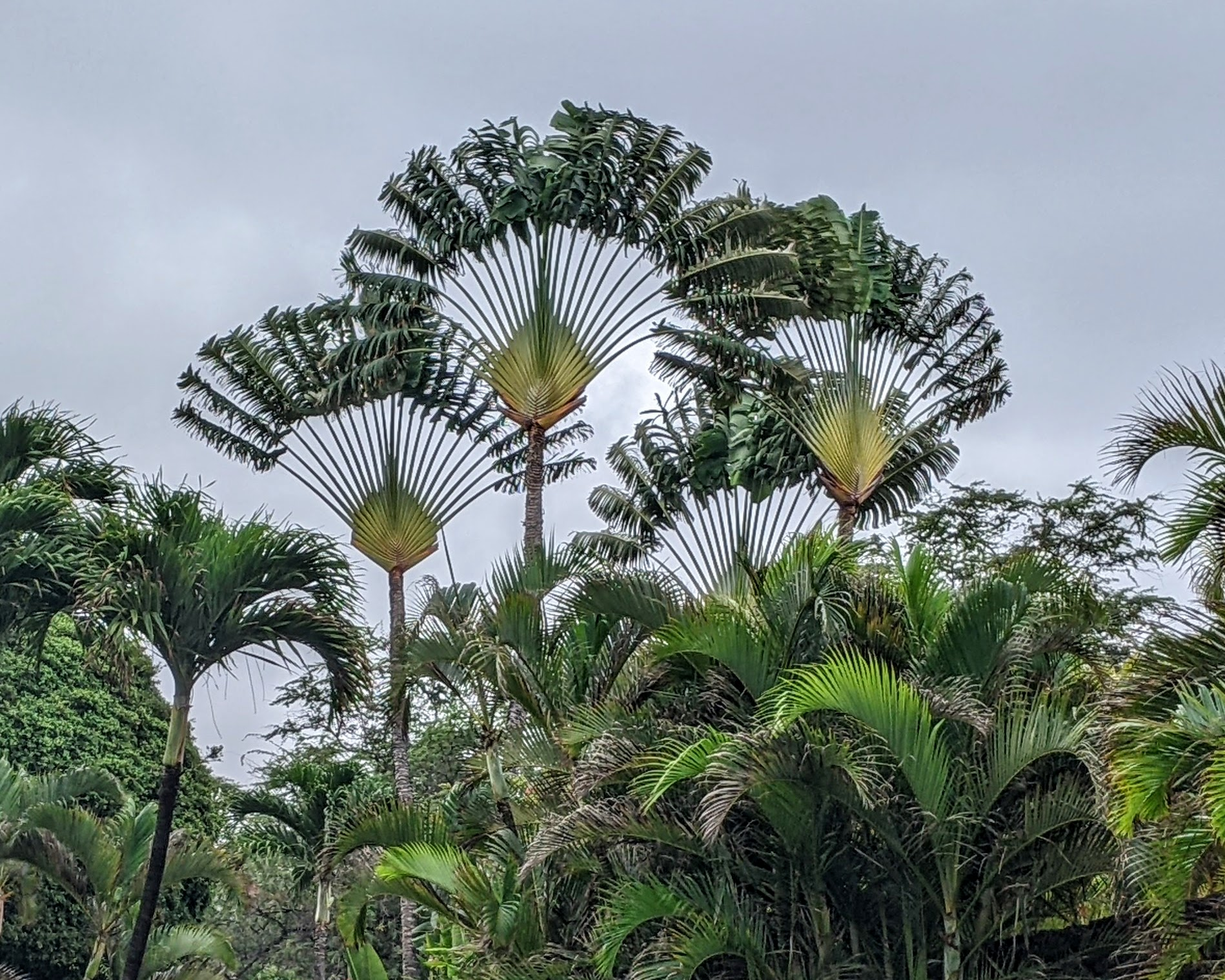

Conservation status
- Least Concern (IUCN 3.1)

Scientific classification
- Kingdom: Plantae
- Clade: Tracheophytes
- Clade: Angiosperms
- Clade: Monocots
- Clade: Commelinids
- Order: Zingiberales
- Family: Strelitziaceae
- Genus: Ravenala
- Species: R. madagascariensis

Binomial name
- Ravenala madagascariensis Sonn.

Synonyms
- Urania madagascariensis (Sonn.) Schreb. ex Forsyth f.; Heliconia ravenala P.Willemet; Urania ravenala (Willemet) A.Rich.; Urania speciosa Willd.

= Ravenala madagascariensis =

Species of tree

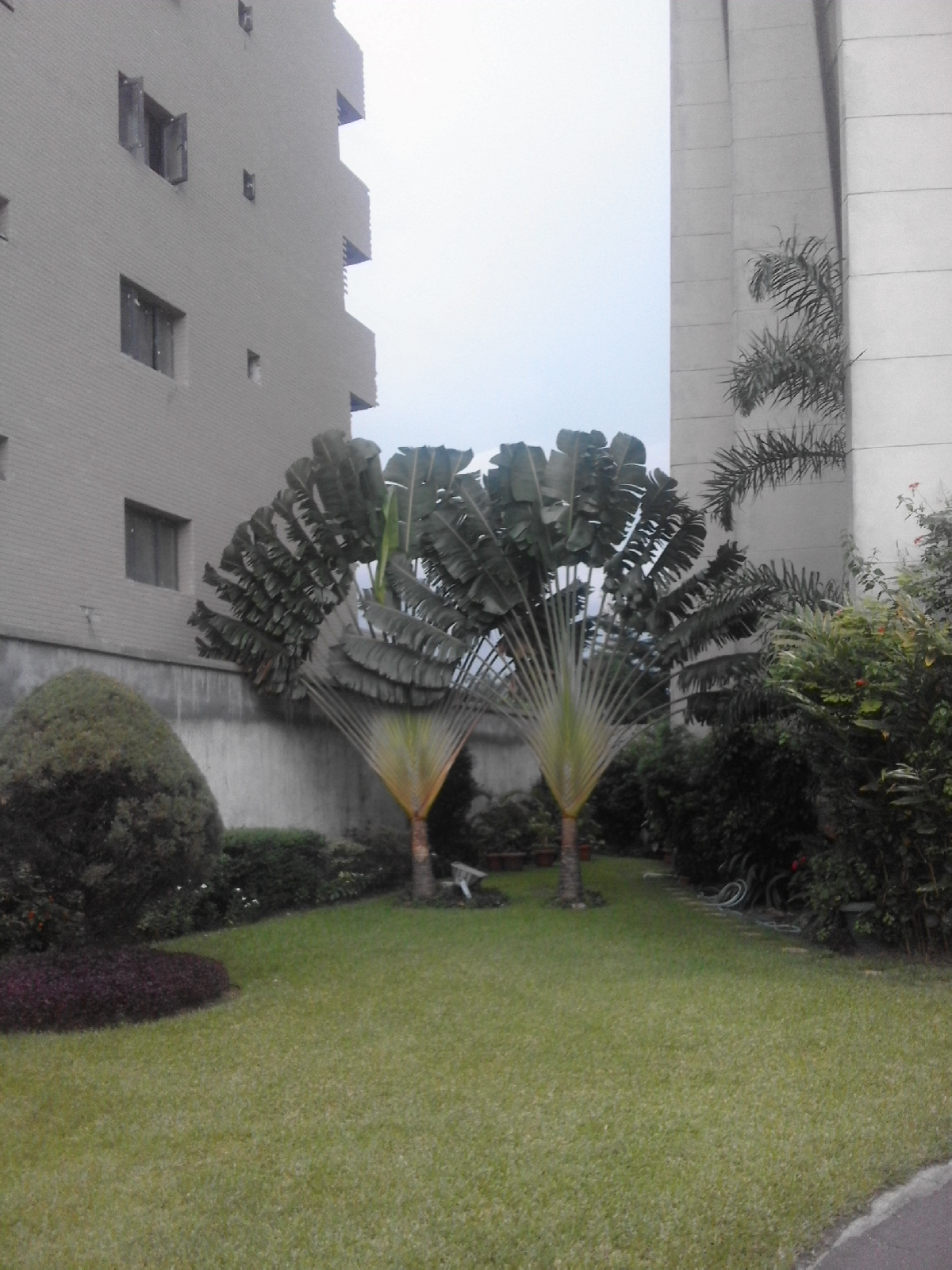
Ravenalas growing between two buildings in Kinshasa, Democratic Republic of Congo. The plane (here perpendicular to the north–south axis) of these plants is orientated to maximize daylight absorption.

Ravenala madagascariensis, commonly known as the traveller's tree, fan palm, traveller's palm or East-West palm, is a species of monocotyledonous flowering plant found in Madagascar. It is not a true palm but a member of the family Strelitziaceae. In tropical and subtropical regions, the plant is widely cultivated for its distinctive habit and foliage.

== Name ==
It has been given the name "traveller's palm" because the sheaths of the stems hold rainwater, which supposedly could be used as an emergency drinking supply for needy travellers. Another plausible reason for its name is that the fan tends to grow on an east–west line, providing a crude compass.

== Description ==
The enormous paddle-shaped leaves are borne on long petioles, in a distinctive fan shape aligned in a single plane (distichous). The foliar fan consists of 30 to 45 leaves for mature specimens, each as much as 36 feet (11 metres) in length. As the plant grows older, it progressively loses the lowest or oldest leaves and reveals a sturdy grey trunk. Of the four forms, varieties or subspecies, the largest is the "Bemavo", from the hills of eastern Madagascar, which can be 100 feet (30 metres) in height with a trunk 2 feet (60 cm) thick.

The large white flowers are structurally similar to those of its relatives, the bird-of-paradise flowers Strelitzia reginae and Strelitzia nicolai, but are generally considered less attractive, with a green bract. These flowers, upon being pollinated, produce brilliant blue seeds.

The chromosome number is 2n = 22.

== Range and habitat ==
Ravenala madagascariensis is widespread in Madagascar, including humid lowland forests, montane forests, grassland, and rocky areas, from sea level to 1,500 meters elevation.

== Ecology ==
Ruffed lemurs are a known pollinator of this plant and given the size and structure of the inflorescences, as well as the lemur's selectivity, method of feeding, and long muzzle, this relationship is thought to have coevolved.

== Cultivation ==
The plant requires a sunny spot (not full sun until it is larger). It responds well to fertilizer, especially if it is high in nitrogen during the growing season. This produces better growth and foliage. The plant grows to an average height of 7 m (23 ft) and requires moderate water.

== Gallery ==
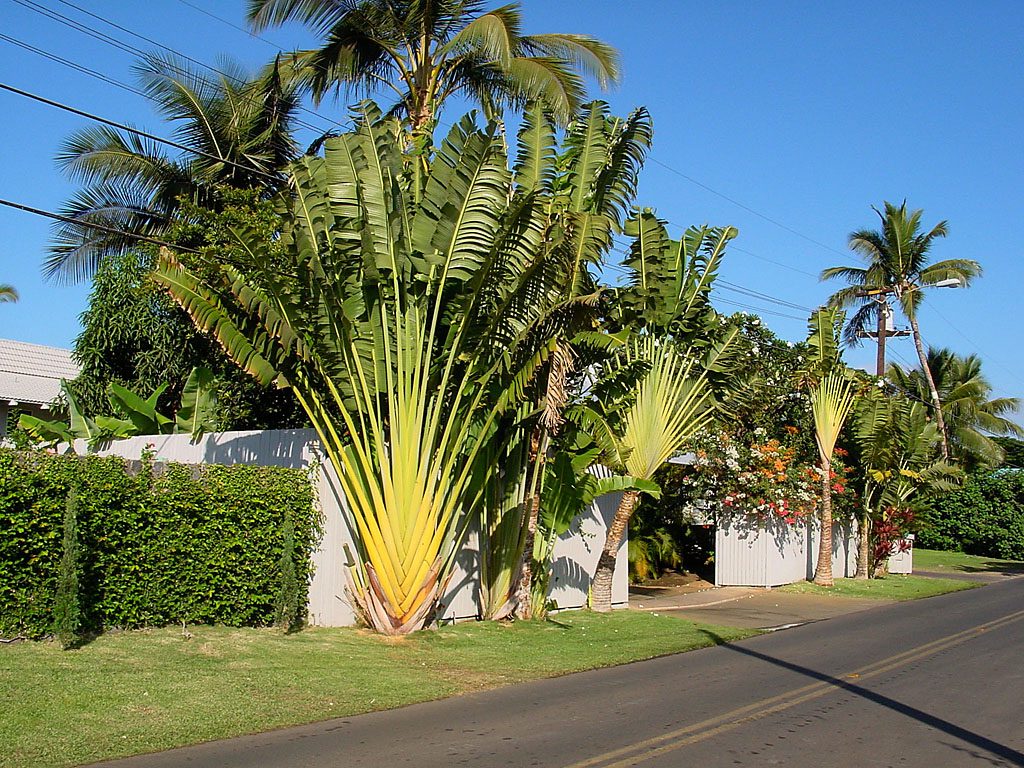
Use in urban setting at Maui, Hawaii

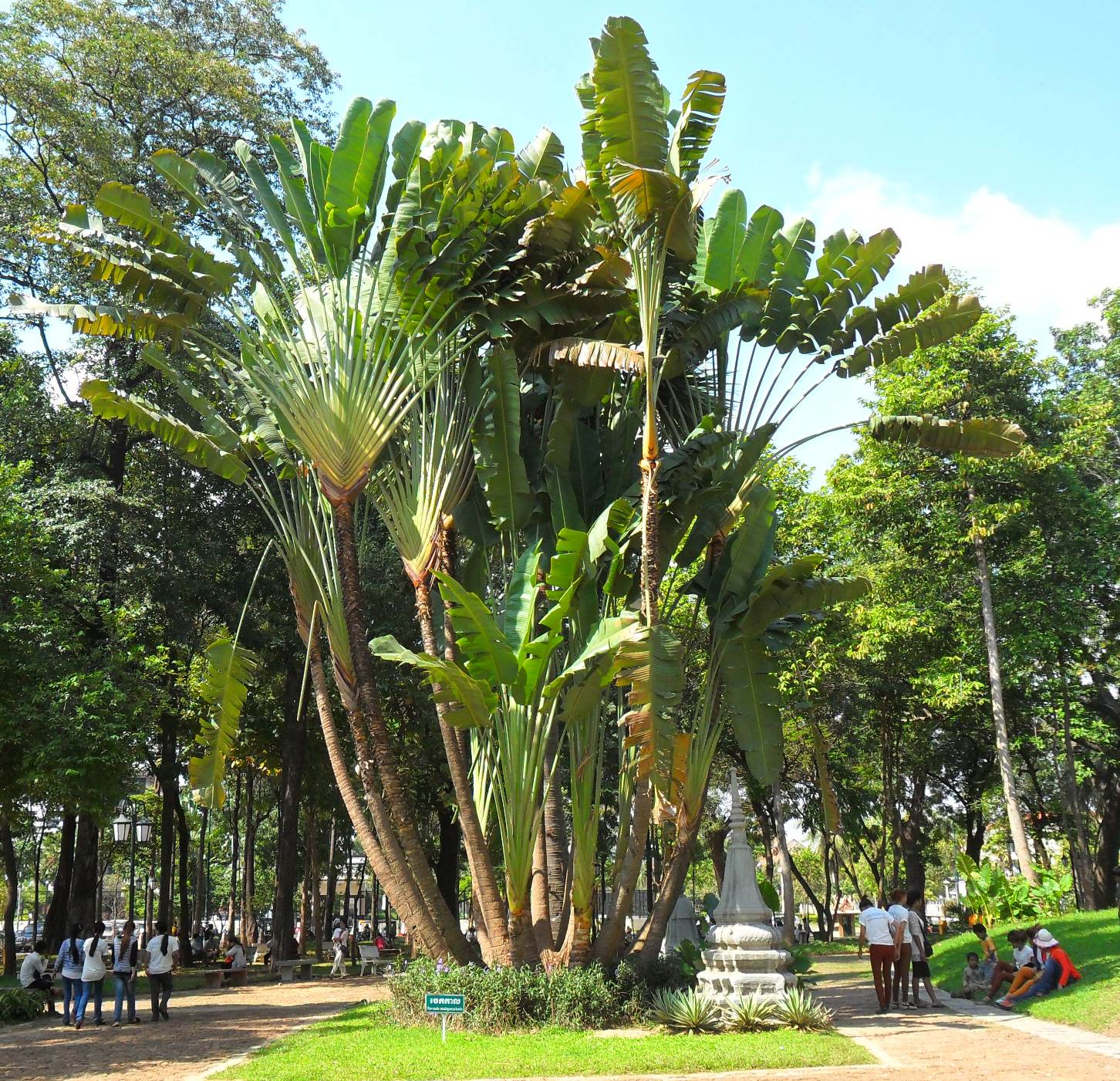
In a park of Phnom Penh, Cambodia

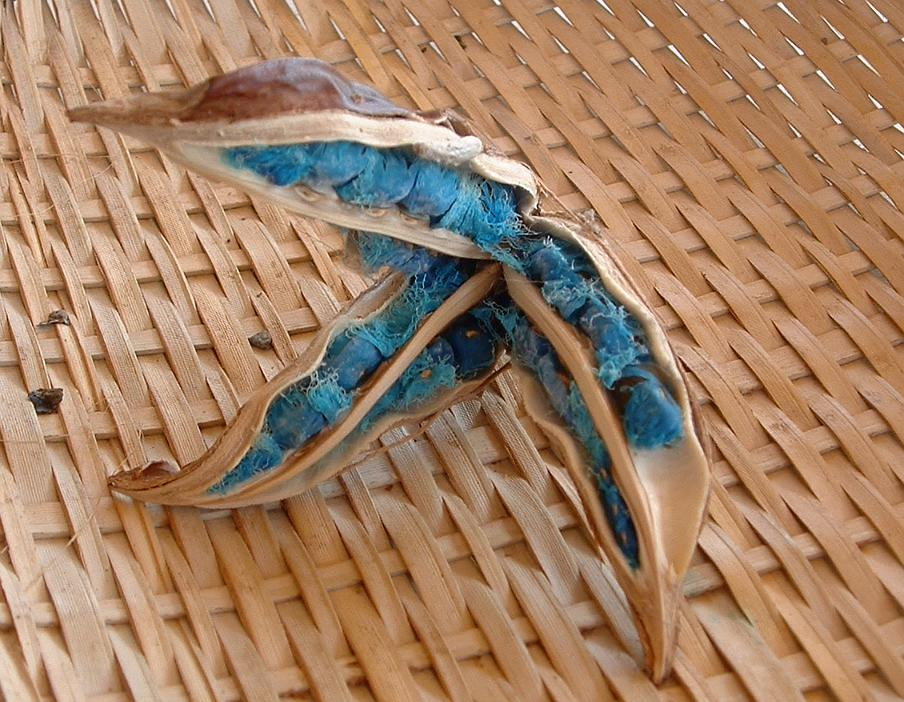
Seeds

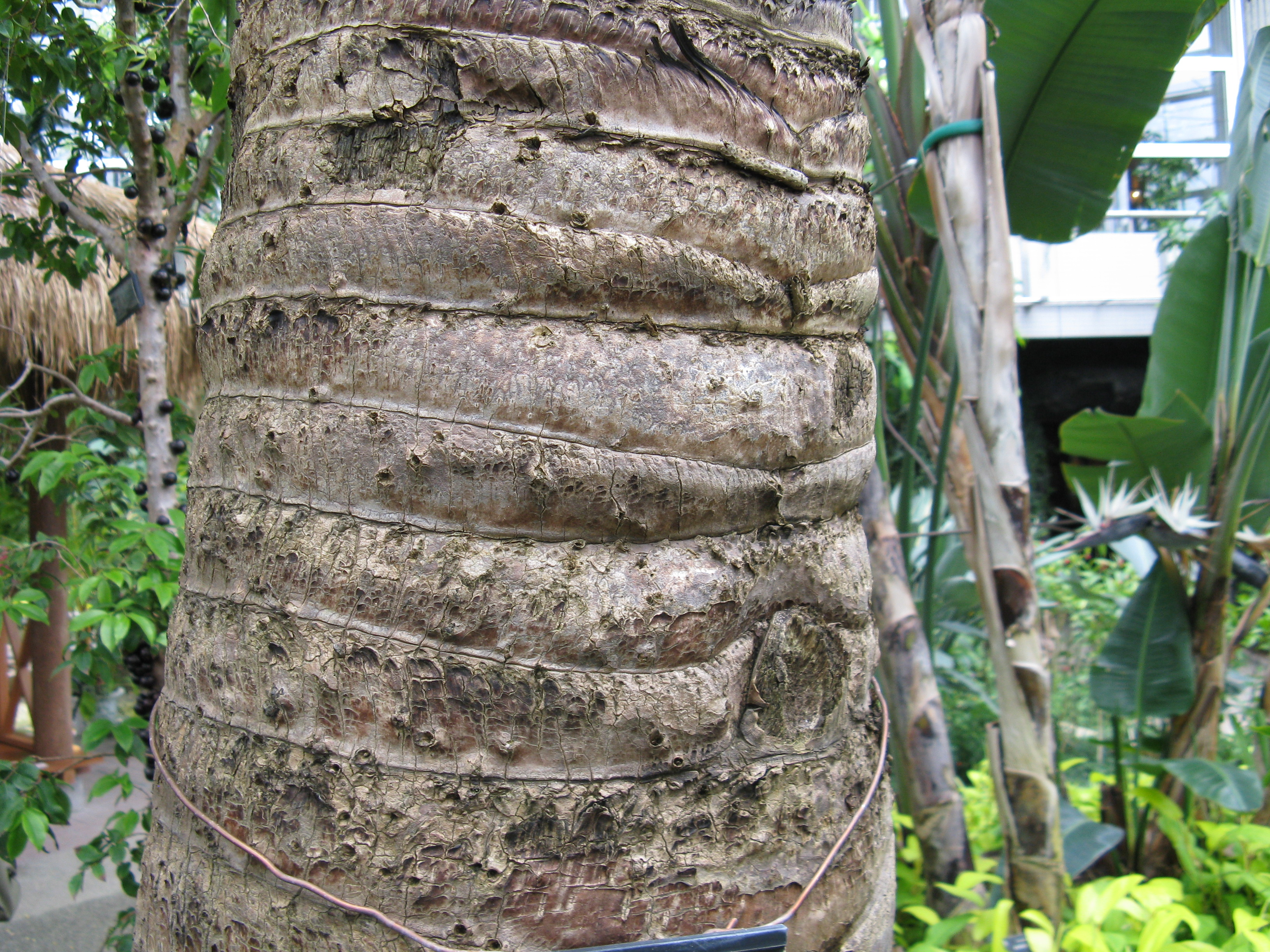
Bark

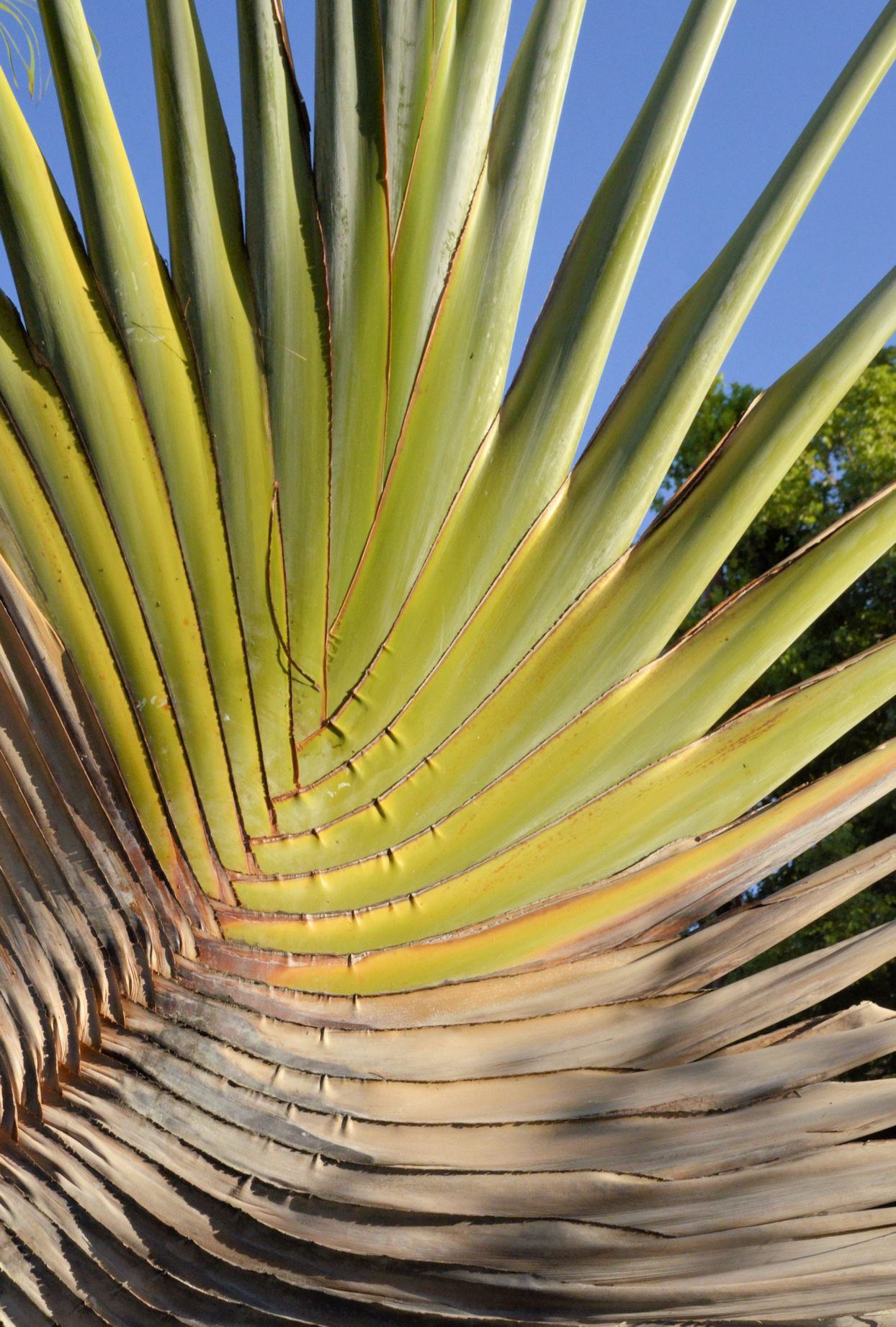
The old petioles dry out brown

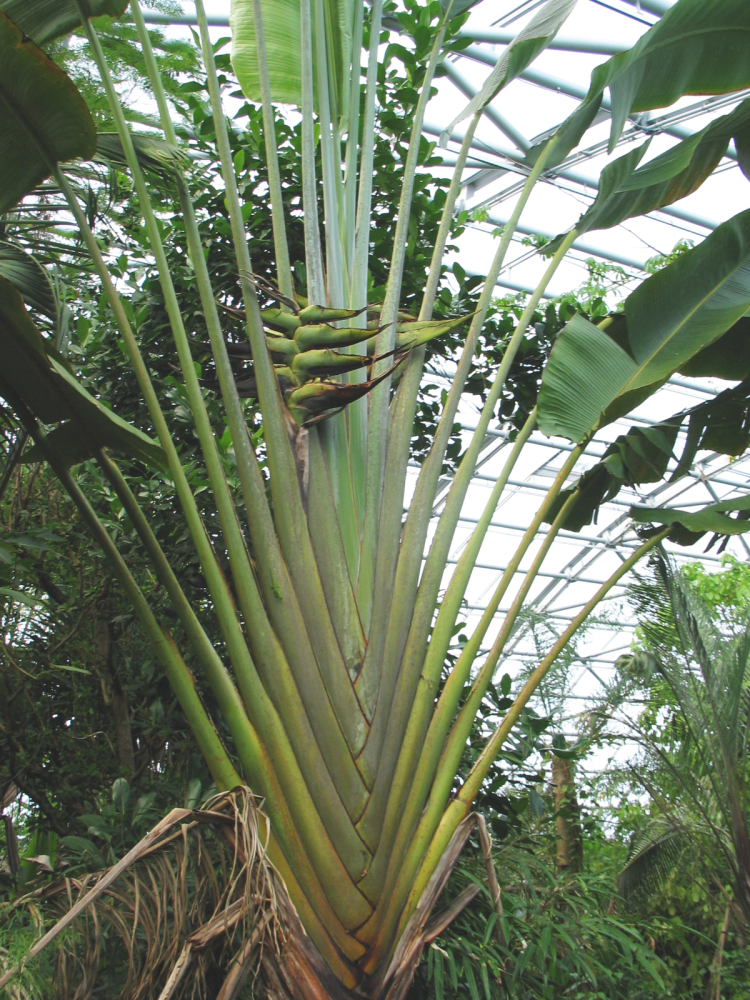
Ravenala with spent inflorescence
