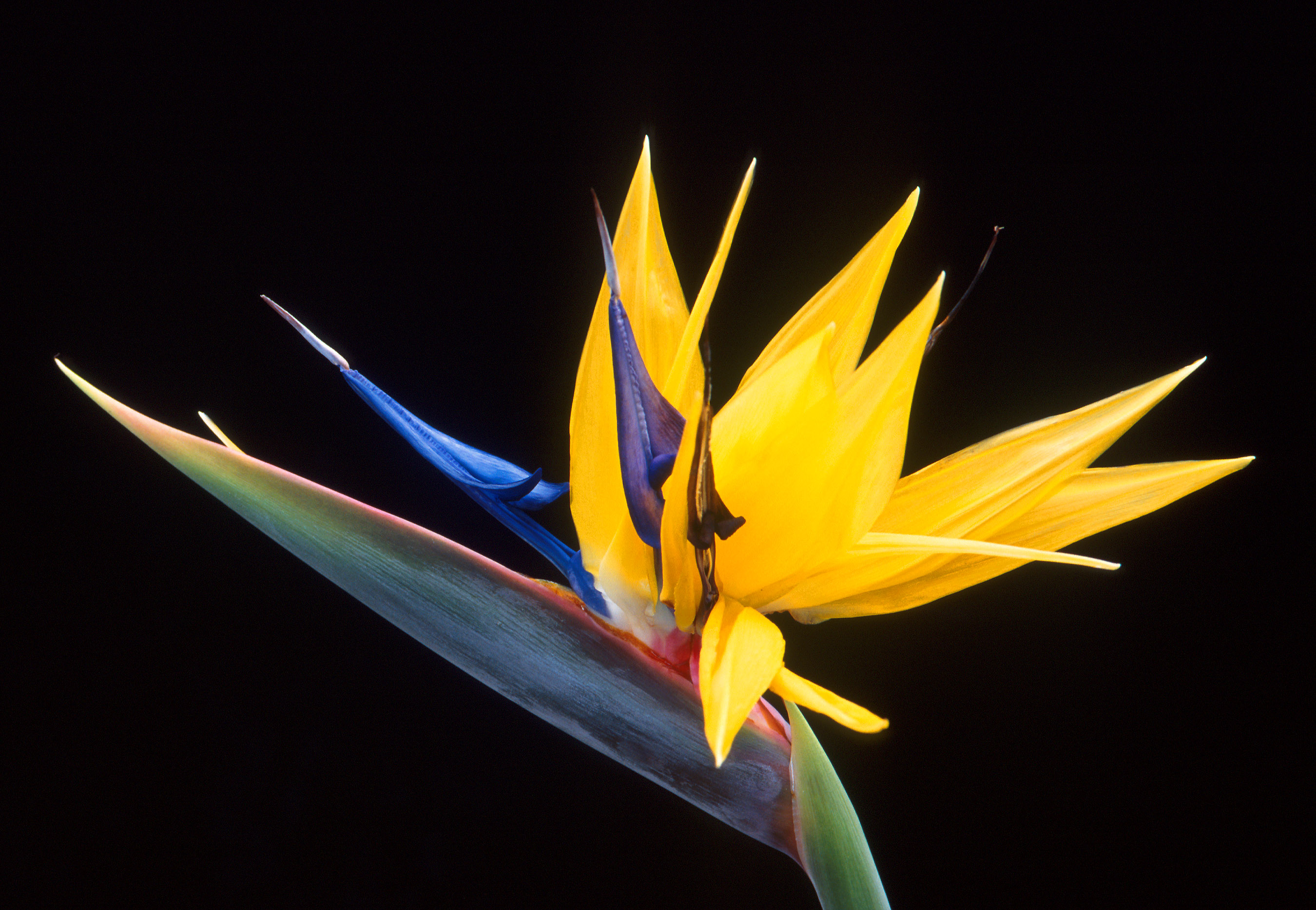

Scientific classification
- Kingdom: Plantae
- Clade: Embryophytes
- Clade: Tracheophytes
- Clade: Angiosperms
- Clade: Monocots
- Clade: Commelinids
- Order: Zingiberales
- Family: Strelitziaceae
- Genus: Strelitzia; Banks

Type species
- Strelitzia reginae

Species
- See text

= Strelitzia =

Genus of flowering plants

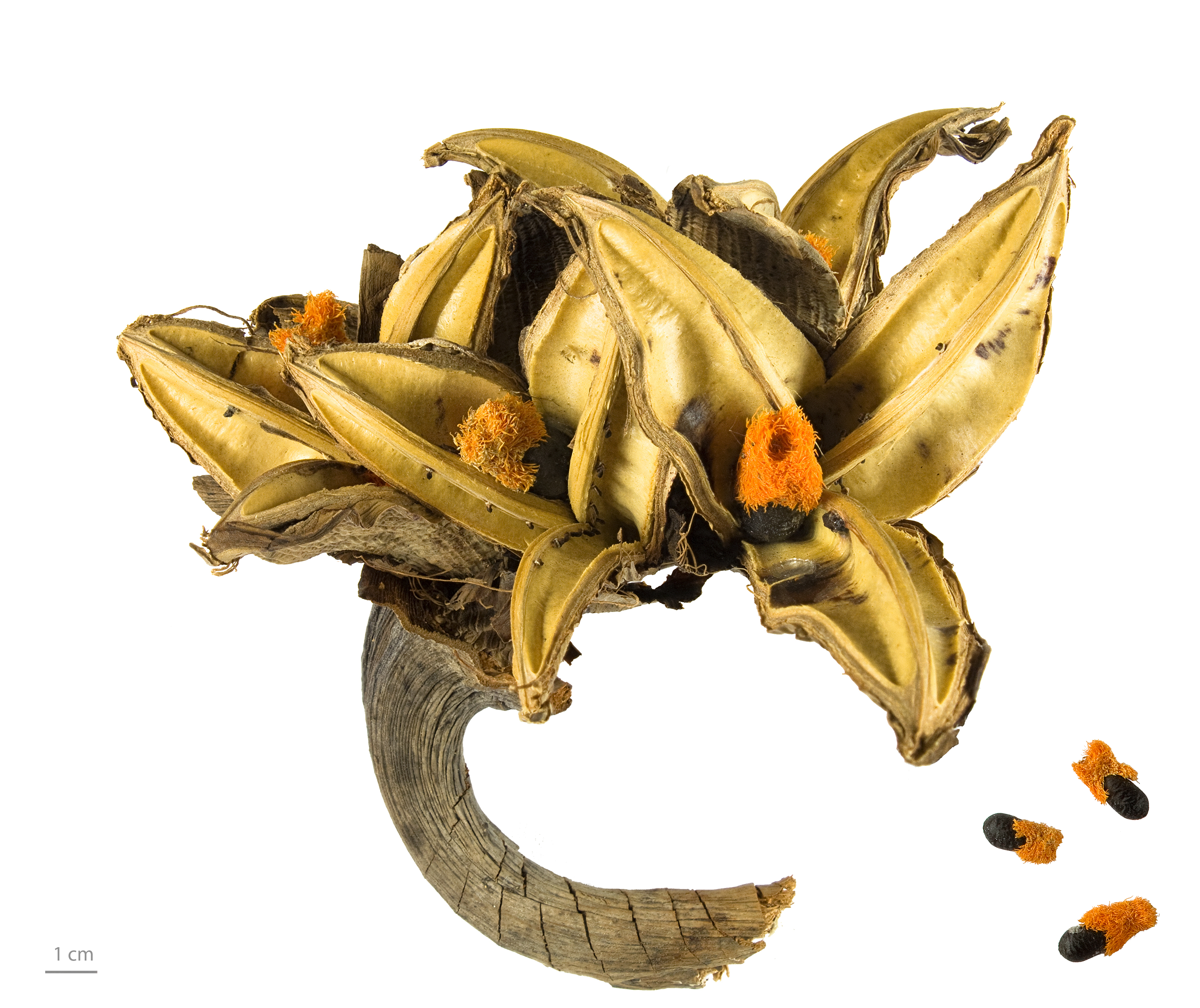
S. reginae fruit capsules and seeds – MHNT

Strelitzia (/strɛˈlɪtsiə/) is a genus of five species of perennial plant, native to South Africa. It belongs to the plant family Strelitziaceae. A common name of the genus is bird of paradise flower/plant, because of its likeness to the birds-of-paradise. In South Africa, it is commonly known as a crane flower.

Two of the species, S. nicolai and S. reginae, are frequently grown as houseplants. It is the floral emblem of the City of Los Angeles and is featured on the reverse of the South African 50-cent coin.

== Taxonomy ==
The genus was named by Joseph Banks in honour of the British queen Charlotte of Mecklenburg-Strelitz.

== Description ==
The species S. nicolai is the largest in the genus, reaching 10 m (33 ft) tall, with stately white and blue flowers; the other species typically reach 2.0 to 3.5 m (6 ft 7 in to 11 ft 6 in) tall, except S. caudata, which is a tree of a typically smaller size than S. nicolai.

The leaves are large, 30 to 200 cm (1 ft 0 in to 6 ft 7 in) long and 10 to 80 cm (3.9 in to 2 ft 7.5 in) broad, similar to a banana leaf in appearance, but with a longer petiole, and arranged strictly in two ranks to form a fan-like crown of evergreen foliage.

The flowers are produced in a horizontal inflorescence emerging from a stout spathe.

== Biology and propagation ==
They are pollinated by sunbirds and blue-faced honeyeaters, which perch on and drink from the spathe. The weight of the bird when standing on the spathe opens it to release the pollen onto the bird's feet, which is then deposited on the next spathe it visits. It is believed to be the only genus of plants pollinated by the feet of birds. Strelitzia species lack natural insect pollinators; in areas without sunbirds, plants in this genus generally need hand pollination to successfully set seed.

== Species and hybrids ==
Five species are recognised, although one—S. juncea—has been shown to be genetically nested within another, S. reginae. It is possibly a mutation that is in the process of speciating.

Image	Scientific name	Common name	Native distribution
	Strelitzia alba (syn. S. augusta)	White bird of paradise	Garden Route along the southernmost coastal regions of the Eastern and Western Capes in South Africa
	Strelitzia caudata	Mountain strelitzia	Chimanimani Mountains of Zimbabwe south to Mozambique, the Northern Provinces of South Africa, and Eswatini
	Strelitzia nicolai	White bird of paradise or giant bird of paradise; wild banana; blue-and-white strelitzia	Mozambique, Botswana, Zimbabwe, and Eastern South Africa from the Great Fish River northwards to Richards Bay
	Strelitzia reginae (syn. S. parvifolia)	Strelitzia, bird of paradise, or crane lily	South Africa (the Cape Provinces and KwaZulu-Natal)
	Strelitzia juncea (Ker Gawl.)	African desert banana	South Africa near Uitenhage, Patensie, and just north of Port Elizabeth

- Strelitzia × kewensis (artificial hybrid between S. reginae and S. augusta)

== Allergenicity ==
Plants in the genus Strelitzia produce no wind-borne pollen, and have an OPALS allergy scale rating of 1, meaning a very low risk of causing allergic reaction.

== Journal ==
Strelitzia is also the name of the botanic journal of the Pretoria-based National Botanical Institute, which has since been converted into the South African National Biodiversity Institute (SANBI). The Strelitzia journal replaced Memoirs of the Botanical Survey of South Africa and Annals of the Kirstenbosch Botanic Gardens.
