= List of heritage sites in Wynberg, Cape Town =

This is a list of the heritage sites in Wynberg Magisterial District in Cape Town, as recognized by the South African Heritage Resources Agency.

SAHRA identifier	Site name	Description	Town	District	NHRA status	Coordinates	Image
9/2/111/0144	Old Organ (1897), Moravian Church, Bridgetown, Athlone		Athlone	Wynberg			Upload Photo
9/2/111/0024	"Sonnenhof", Homestead Avenue, Bergvliet, Cape Town		Bergvliet	Wynberg			Upload Photo
9/2/111/0050	Bergvliet Farm, Bergvliet, Cape Town	Type of site: Farm Complex. The Cape Dutch house on this historic farmyard dates from 1769. The ring-wall and outbuildings were erected in about the middle of the nineteenth century. The farm Bergvliet originally formed part of Simon van der Stel's farm Constantia.	Cape Town, Bergvliet	Wynberg	Provincial Heritage Site	34°02′45″S 18°27′15″E	Type of site: Farm Complex. The Cape Dutch house on this historic farmyard dates from 1769. The ring-wall and outbuildings were erected in about the middle of the nineteenth century. The farm Bergvliet originally formed part of Simon van der Stel's farm Constantia.
9/2/111/0126	Dreyersdal Farm, Dreyersdal Road, Bergvliet, Cape Town		Bergvliet	Wynberg		34°03′21″S 18°27′22″E	Upload Photo
9/2/111/0060	Van Riebeeck's Hedge, Bishopscourt, Cape Town		Bishopscourt	Wynberg			
9/2/111/0060/002	Van Riebeeck's Hedge, Bishopscourt, Cape Town	This Wild almond hedge was planted in 1660 on the instructions on Jan van Riebeeck to mark the boundaries of the settlement at the Cape. The two portions of the hedge which escaped destruction are the oldest declared national monuments in South Africa.	Cape Town, Bishopscourt	Wynberg	Provincial Heritage Site	33°59′42″S 18°26′44″E	Upload Photo
9/2/111/0145	Bishops Court, Wynberg District		Bishopscourt	Wynberg			
9/2/111/0045	Church of the Good Shepherd, Kirstenbosch Drive, Bishopscourt, Cape		Bishopscourt	Wynberg		33°59′11″S 18°26′13″E	
9/2/111/0060/001	Van Riebeeck's Hedge, Kirstenbosch Botanical Garden, Cape Town	Type of site: Hedge, Fortification.	Bishopscourt	Wynberg	Provincial Heritage Site	33°59′15″S 18°25′58″E	Type of site: Hedge, Fortification.
9/2/111/0134	Botanical Gardens, Kirstenbosch, Cape Town		Bishopscourt	Wynberg		33°59′15″S 18°25′58″E	
9/2/111/0077	CLAREMONT, GENERAL, CAPE TOWN		Claremont	Wynberg			Upload Photo
9/2/111/0117	St Saviour's Church, Main Road, Claremont, Cape Town	The nucleus of this neo-Gothic church was designed and erected by Sophia Gray in 1850. The bell tower, the two bays for the nave and the north-west porch were added in honour of Bishop Gray and his wife Sophia who died in 1872 and 1871, respectively. Type of site: Church Current use: Church : Anglican.	Cape Town, Claremont	Wynberg	Provincial Heritage Site	33°57′24″S 18°28′17″E	The nucleus of this neo-Gothic church was designed and erected by Sophia Gray in 1850. The bell tower, the two bays for the nave and the north-west porch were added in honour of Bishop Gray and his wife Sophia who died in 1872 and 1871, respectively. Type of site: Church Current use: Church : Anglican.
9/2/111/0143	Palmyra Homestead, 7 Montrose Avenue, Claremont, Cape Town	The earlier wing of the house is exceptionally old, originally being a simple four roomed cottage, probably dating to the 18th century, when the property formed part of the Weltevreden Estate. Very few such early structures are known to exist in the suburbs of Cape Town. The distinctive main reception wing with its fine portico was added 1830s and is an excellent example of its period. The building retains excellent layering and patina.	Cape Town, Claremont	Wynberg	Register	33°58′55″S 18°28′08″E	Upload Photo
9/2/111/0027	65 Bowwood Road, Claremont, Cape Town		Claremont	Wynberg		33°59′14″S 18°27′14″E	Upload Photo
9/2/111/0032	Vredenhof, Keurboom Road, Claremont, Cape Town		Cape Town, Claremont	Wynberg	Provincial Heritage Site	33°58′21″S 18°28′25″E	
9/2/111/0034	Herschel Memorial Obelisk, Grove Primary School, Feldhausen Road, Claremont, Cape Town	Main article: Grove Primary School (South Africa) Beyond Newlands lies the suburb of Claremont. The Herschel monument stands in Grove Avenue on what was formerly the Feldhausen property. Sir John F. W. Herschel (1792-1871) was a famous British astronomer, the only son of an equally famous astronomer, Sir William Herschel. He came to the Cape in January, 1834, to make astronomical observations. He went to live at Claremont and stayed there until March, 1838. Type of site: School.	Cape Town, Claremont	Wynberg	Provincial Heritage Site	33°56′47″S 18°28′20″E	Beyond Newlands lies the suburb of Claremont. The Herschel monument stands in Grove Avenue on what was formerly the Feldhausen property. Sir John F. W. Herschel (1792-1871) was a famous British astronomer, the only son of an equally famous astronomer, Sir William Herschel. He came to the Cape in January, 1834, to make astronomical observations. He went to live at Claremont and stayed there until March, 1838. Type of site: School.
9/2/111/0040	15 Feldhausen Avenue, Claremont, Cape Town		Claremont	Wynberg		33°58′52″S 18°27′33″E	Upload Photo
9/2/111/0054	Arderne Public Gardens, Main Road, Claremont, Cape Town	These gardens were established by Ralph Henry Arderne in 1845 and with the help of his son, Henry Mathew, he developed them into one of the most imported gardens of the Victorian era. These gardens are of great botanical, scientific and environmental importance. Type of site: Botanical Garden.	Cape Town, Claremont	Wynberg	Provincial Heritage Site	33°57′24″S 18°28′17″E	These gardens were established by Ralph Henry Arderne in 1845 and with the help of his son, Henry Mathew, he developed them into one of the most imported gardens of the Victorian era. These gardens are of great botanical, scientific and environmental importance. Type of site: Botanical Garden. Media related to Arderne Gardens at Wikimedia Commons
9/2/111/0069	Congregational Church, Main Road, Claremont, Cape Town	The original part of the church building dates from 1877. The church itself is closely associated with the history of the southern suburbs of Cape Town. Type of site: Church Current use: Church : Congregational.	Cape Town, Claremont	Wynberg	Provincial Heritage Site	33°57′24″S 18°28′17″E	The original part of the church building dates from 1877. The church itself is closely associated with the history of the southern suburbs of Cape Town. Type of site: Church Current use: Church : Congregational.
9/2/111/0150	Rochford, 5 Montrose Avenue, Claremont, Cape Town	This early to mid 19th century cottage together with the neighbouring Palmyra homestead constitute a fine example of the original settlement in Claremont and are the key to the ambiance of this road. The building is well maintained.	Cape Town, Claremont	Wynberg	Register	33°58′54″S 18°28′07″E	Upload Photo
9/2/111/0153	Burial Vaults, cnr Bishoplea and Feldhausen, Claremont		Claremont	Wynberg		33°58′56″S 18°27′34″E	Upload Photo
9/2/111/0014	CONSTANTIA MUNICIPAL AREA GENERAL, WYNBERG DISTRICT		Constantia	Wynberg			Upload Photo
9/2/111/0003	Alphen, Constantia, Cape Town	The Alphen property was granted to Theunis van Schalkwyk in 1714. The historic homestead dates back to the middle of the 18th century, although the upper storey was probably added only later. Architecturally, Alphen is a square double-storeyed manor house. Type of site: Farmstead.	Cape Town, Constantia	Wynberg	Provincial Heritage Site	34°00′57″S 18°27′01″E	The Alphen property was granted to Theunis van Schalkwyk in 1714. The historic homestead dates back to the middle of the 18th century, although the upper storey was probably added only later. Architecturally, Alphen is a square double-storeyed manor house. Type of site: Farmstead.
9/2/111/0015	Groot Constantia, Constantia, Wynberg District	Main article: Groot Constantia The road to Constantia swings to the right in Wynberg to enter Constantia, one of the most picturesque valleys in South Africa. Here we find some of the best examples of Cape Dutch architecture, and the best known of them is Groot Constantia. On 31 July 1685, the High Commissioner, Hendrik Adriaan van Reede, granted a farm of 762 hectares, which was to become known as Constantia, to Simon van der Stel. The origin of the name is not known. Various additions were made to the original grant from time to time—Witteboomen, the Zeekoeijenvalleij that included Wynberg and extended eastwards as far as False Bay and, finally, the right "to graze stock, plough, sow and fish" in the Steenberg. The farm Constantia was subdivided after the death of Simon van der Stel in 1712. The farm Constantia with the Cape Dutch manor house thereon was acquired in 1885. Type of site: Farmstead.	Cape Town, Constantia	Wynberg	Provincial Heritage Site	34°01′33″S 18°25′23″E	The road to Constantia swings to the right in Wynberg to enter Constantia, one of the most picturesque valleys in South Africa. Here we find some of the best examples of Cape Dutch architecture, and the best known of them is Groot Constantia. On 31 July 1685, the High Commissioner, Hendrik Adriaan van Reede, granted a farm of 762 hectares, which was to become known as Constantia, to Simon van der Stel. The origin of the name is not known. Various additions were made to the original grant from time to time—Witteboomen, the Zeekoeijenvalleij that included Wynberg and extended eastwards as far as False Bay and, finally, the right "to graze stock, plough, sow and fish" in the Steenberg. The farm Constantia was subdivided after the death of Simon van der Stel in 1712. The farm Constantia with the Cape Dutch manor house thereon was acquired in 1885. Type of site: Farmstead. Media related to Groot Constantia at Wikimedia Commons
9/2/111/0015/007	Hoop op Constantia, Constantia, Wynberg District	Hoop op Constantia is only a short distance from Groot Constantia and is most easily reached on foot from there. Hoop op Constantia was originally a part of Simon van der Stel's estate Constantia, which was granted to Simon van der Stel in 1685 and was subdivided after his death in 1712. After his death his executrix, Johanna Wessels, Frans van der Stel's wife, sold the estate in three portions on 20 June 1715. Captain Oloff Bergh acquired Groot Constantia, while Simon Pieter de Meyer bought Klein Constantia and Bergvliet, together measuring about 570 hectares. The farm Constantia with the Cape Dutch manor house thereon was acquired in 1885. Type of site: Farm Complex.	Cape Town, Constantia	Wynberg	Provincial Heritage Site	34°01′33″S 18°25′23″E	Hoop op Constantia is only a short distance from Groot Constantia and is most easily reached on foot from there. Hoop op Constantia was originally a part of Simon van der Stel's estate Constantia, which was granted to Simon van der Stel in 1685 and was subdivided after his death in 1712. After his death his executrix, Johanna Wessels, Frans van der Stel's wife, sold the estate in three portions on 20 June 1715. Captain Oloff Bergh acquired Groot Constantia, while Simon Pieter de Meyer bought Klein Constantia and Bergvliet, together measuring about 570 hectares. The farm Constantia with the Cape Dutch manor house thereon was acquired in 1885. Type of site: Farm Complex.
9/2/111/0015/1	Jonkershuis complex, Groot Constantia, Constantia, Wynberg District		Constantia	Wynberg		34°01′50″S 18°25′09″E	
9/2/111/0015/2	Bertram wine cellar, Groot Constantia, Constantia, Wynberg District		Constantia	Wynberg			Upload Photo
9/2/111/0015/3	Old wine cellar, Groot Constantia, Constantia, Wynberg District		Constantia	Wynberg			
9/2/111/0015/4	Cloete cemetery, Groot Constantia, Wynberg District	Walled family graveyard on Groot Constantia farm, containing graves of about 20 individuals from the 18th and 19th centuries.	Constantia	Wynberg		34°01′51″S 18°25′28″E	Upload Photo
9/2/111/0015/5	Colyn burial vault, Groot Constantia, Constantia, Wynberg District		Constantia	Wynberg			Upload Photo
9/2/111/0015/6	Main house, Groot Constantia, Constantia, Wynberg District		Constantia	Wynberg		34°01′47″S 18°25′15″E	
9/2/111/0065	Timour Hall, Constantia, Cape Town	Type of site: House. This historic building is built in an interesting mixture of eighteenth and nineteenth century architectural styles. The large property on which it stands also contributes considerably to the character of the urban area in which it is situated.	Cape Town, Constantia	Wynberg	Provincial Heritage Site	34°01′15″S 18°27′52″E	Upload Photo
9/2/111/0065/1	Constantia Glen, cnr Lochner & Martin Roads, Constantia, Wynberg		Constantia	Wynberg		34°01′23″S 18°27′28″E	Upload Photo
9/2/111/0087	Conway Redoubt, Constantia Nek, Wynberg District		Constantia	Wynberg			Upload Photo
9/2/111/0091	Hohenhort, Claasenbosch, Constantia, Wynberg District		Constantia	Wynberg		34°00′07″S 18°26′04″E	Upload Photo
9/2/111/0094	Nova Constantia, Constantia, Wynberg District	Nova Constantia originally formed part of the Groot Constantia estate and the house probably dates from the first quarter of the 19th century. The homestead is U-shaped and is regarded, mainly because of its impressive gables and its setting, as one of the finest Cape Dutch houses. Type of site: Farmstead.	Cape Town, Constantia	Wynberg	Provincial Heritage Site	34°01′33″S 18°25′23″E	Nova Constantia originally formed part of the Groot Constantia estate and the house probably dates from the first quarter of the 19th century. The homestead is U-shaped and is regarded, mainly because of its impressive gables and its setting, as one of the finest Cape Dutch houses. Type of site: Farmstead.
9/2/111/0109	Goedgeloof, Provence Avenue, Constantia, Cape Town	Goedgeloof stands side by side with the larger more impressive Bel Ombre. It was possibly a guesthouse to the main building. The house, which originally had no hearth, was upgraded during the later part of the 19th century. This possibly happened while DR. H The farm which originally included both the properties, Belle Ombre and Goedgeloof was granted in 1728 to two brothers named Beck. In 1744 the farm, which was by now known as Goedgeloef, was bought by Jacob van Reenen. In 1775 it came into the joint ownership of Josephus Anthonius Becker and the assistant supervisor of de Schuur. Type of site: House Current use: House.	Cape Town, Constantia	Wynberg	Provincial Heritage Site	34°00′46″S 18°25′49″E	Upload Photo
9/2/111/0130	Oran Cayen graveyard, Tokai Road, Constantia, Wynberg District		Constantia	Wynberg			Upload Photo
9/2/111/0131	Parish Road cemetery, Constantia, Wynberg District		Constantia	Wynberg			Upload Photo
9/2/111/0142	Klein Constantia, Klein Constantia Road, Constantia		Constantia	Wynberg		34°02′21″S 18°24′47″E	Media related to Klein Constantia at Wikimedia Commons
9/2/111/0159	Kramat, Erf 2610, Islam Hill, Constantia		Constantia	Wynberg		34°02′09″S 18°25′45″E	
9/2/111/0011	HOUT BAY MUNICIPAL AREA GENERAL, WYNBERG DISTRICT		Hout Bay	Wynberg			Upload Photo
9/2/111/0141	Chapmans Peak Scenic Drive, Wynberg District		Hout Bay	Wynberg		34°03′28″S 18°21′58″E	
9/2/111/0026	West Battery (West Fort), Hout Bay, Cape Town	The Dutch East India Company, and later the British government, were interested in Hout Bay not only because of its forests, but also because it could serve as an alternative anchorage when Table Bay was unsafe, and above all because it offered a possible landing place for hostile forces. Consequently fortifications were erected towards the end of the eighteenth century, first on the western side of the bay at the foot of the mountain called Hangklip, and later on the eastern side below Chapman's Peak. Type of site: Battery.	Cape Town, Hout Bay	Wynberg	Provincial Heritage Site	34°03′20″S 18°20′52″E	Upload Photo
9/2/111/0048	East Fort and Battery, Hout Bay, Cape Town	The Dutch East India Company, and later the British government, were interested in Hout Bay not only uecause of its forests, but also because it could serve as an alternative anchorage when Table Bay was unsafe, and above all because it offered a possible landing place for hostile forces. Consequently fortifications were erected towards the end of the eighteenth century, first on the western side of the bay at the foot of the mountain called Hangklip, and later on the eastern side below Chapman’s Peak. Type of site: Fort Previous use: Fortification. Current use: Vacant.	Cape Town, Hout Bay	Wynberg	Provincial Heritage Site	34°02′00″S 18°21′00″E	The Dutch East India Company, and later the British government, were interested in Hout Bay not only uecause of its forests, but also because it could serve as an alternative anchorage when Table Bay was unsafe, and above all because it offered a possible landing place for hostile forces. Consequently fortifications were erected towards the end of the eighteenth century, first on the western side of the bay at the foot of the mountain called Hangklip, and later on the eastern side below Chapman’s Peak. Type of site: Fort Previous use: Fortification. Current use: Vacant. Media related to East Fort at Wikimedia Commons
9/2/111/0049	Kronendal, Main Road, Hout Bay, Cape Town	In the very year that he arrived at the Cape, Jan van Riebeeck sent woodsmen to Hout Bay to look for timber and in July, 1653, he went to investigate the forests in the "Houtbayken" for himself. In his journal he wrote: "The forests were the finest in the world, however, and contained timber as long, thick and straight as one could wish." Unfortunately "the passage (was) so stony, hilly, mountainous and marshy" that no attempt was made to convey timber from there to the fort and it was only in 1693 that the "wagon road to the forest" was extended from Kirstenbosch over Constantia Nek to Hout Bay. Type of site: Farmstead. Kronendal was built in 1800 and is a very fine example of the old Cape Architecture.	Cape Town, Hout Bay	Wynberg	Provincial Heritage Site	34°02′20″S 18°21′31″E	In the very year that he arrived at the Cape, Jan van Riebeeck sent woodsmen to Hout Bay to look for timber and in July, 1653, he went to investigate the forests in the "Houtbayken" for himself. In his journal he wrote: "The forests were the finest in the world, however, and contained timber as long, thick and straight as one could wish." Unfortunately "the passage (was) so stony, hilly, mountainous and marshy" that no attempt was made to convey timber from there to the fort and it was only in 1693 that the "wagon road to the forest" was extended from Kirstenbosch over Constantia Nek to Hout Bay. Type of site: Farmstead. Kronendal was built in 1800 and is a very fine example of the old Cape Architecture.
9/2/111/0012	"Southern Cross", Bloemerf, Valley Road, Hout Bay, Wynberg District		Hout Bay	Wynberg			Upload Photo
9/2/111/0068	Old Hout Bay Post Office, Main Road, Hout Bay		Hout Bay	Wynberg		34°02′33″S 18°21′33″E	Upload Photo
9/2/111/0075	Oak Villa, Baviaanskloof Road, Hout Bay, Cape Town	Oak Villa is one of the first townhouses in Hout Bay and the first to be erected in the Baviaanskloof area. The original portion of this cottage, consisting of three rooms, was erected in 1850 by the then owner Mr. Trautman as a second dwelling house. Type of site: House. The core of this fisherman's cottage, in the typical vernacular style, dates from the 1850s. Additions were made in 1878.	Cape Town, Hout Bay	Wynberg	Provincial Heritage Site	34°02′39″S 18°21′56″E	Upload Photo
9/2/111/0089	Groot Moddergat, Main Road, Hout Bay		Hout Bay	Wynberg			Upload Photo
9/2/111/0140	Nooitgedacht Barn, cnr Lentedal & Valley Roads, Hout Bay		Hout Bay	Wynberg			Upload Photo
9/2/111/0149	Historic Oak Avenue, Erf 4029, Hout Bay		Hout Bay	Wynberg			Upload Photo
9/2/111/0007	Long Kloof, Main Road, Hout Bay, Cape Town	The land on which Langkloof stands was granted to Christopher Bird, Colonial Secretary of the Cape, in 1821. By 1885 the property belonged to P.O. Boonzaaier who built Moddergat of which Langkloof was the wine cellar.	Cape Town, Hout Bay	Wynberg	Provincial Heritage Site	34°02′20″S 18°21′31″E	The land on which Langkloof stands was granted to Christopher Bird, Colonial Secretary of the Cape, in 1821. By 1885 the property belonged to P.O. Boonzaaier who built Moddergat of which Langkloof was the wine cellar.
9/2/111/0009	Hout Bay Hotel, Hout Bay, Wynberg District		Hout Bay	Wynberg		34°02′35″S 18°21′38″E	Upload Photo
9/2/111/0021	KENILWORTH, GENERAL, CAPE TOWN		Kenilworth	Wynberg			Upload Photo
9/2/111/0013	Pelyn, Ascot Road, Kenilworth, Cape Town	Type of site: House. This house and garden is an important example of British Colonial architecture at the turn of the century and is notable as the home of the architect F K Kendall.	Cape Town, Kenilworth	Wynberg	Provincial Heritage Site	33°59′45″S 18°28′41″E	Type of site: House. This house and garden is an important example of British Colonial architecture at the turn of the century and is notable as the home of the architect F K Kendall.
9/2/111/0023	"Bedford", cnr Melbourne & Stamford Roads, Kenilworth, Cape Town		Kenilworth	Wynberg		33°59′41″S 18°27′38″E	Upload Photo
9/2/111/0056	Stellenberg, Oak Avenue, Kenilworth, Cape Town	Type of site: Farmstead. Stellenberg is one of the finest and most historical of the Cape Dutch gabled houses. It dates from the second half of the eighteenth century.	Cape Town, Kenilworth	Wynberg	Provincial Heritage Site	33°59′41″S 18°27′52″E	Type of site: Farmstead. Stellenberg is one of the finest and most historical of the Cape Dutch gabled houses. It dates from the second half of the eighteenth century.
9/2/111/0058	Highlands, 36 Tennant Road, Kenilworth, Cape Town		Kenilworth	Wynberg		33°59′49″S 18°27′49″E	Upload Photo
9/2/111/0074	Ascot House, 5 Ascot Road, Kenilworth, Cape Town		Cape Town, Kenilworth	Wynberg	Provincial Heritage Site	33°59′54″S 18°28′33″E	
9/2/111/0084	Beau Soleil, Salisbury Road, Kenilworth, Cape Town	The property on which this late nineteenth century home was bought in 1877 by Mr. Dirk Cloete and the house was built during the same year. In 1920 it was sold to Mr. John G Rose. The house is a gentlemen's residence in the neo-Gothic style. Later additio The original portion of this double-storeyed manor house with its neo-Gothic and Victorian characteristics was built in 1877 by Dirk Cloete. Further additions, as well as the redbrick coach house with its elegant rustication, were made at the turn of the century.	Cape Town, Kenilworth	Wynberg	Provincial Heritage Site	33°59′58″S 18°28′16″E	Upload Photo
9/2/111/0088	Banksia, 2 Pine Street, Kenilworth, Cape Town		Kenilworth	Wynberg		33°59′27″S 18°28′13″E	Upload Photo
9/2/111/0111	15 Alexander Road, Kenilworth, Cape Town		Cape Town, Kenilworth	Wynberg	Provincial Heritage Site	33°58′40″S 18°30′16″E	Upload Photo
9/2/111/0120	Kenilworth Clinic, Kenilworth Road, Kenilworth, Cape Town		Kenilworth	Wynberg		33°59′43″S 18°28′20″E	Upload Photo
9/2/111/0138	2 Richmond Road/20 Kenilworth Road, Kenilworth, Cape Town		Kenilworth	Wynberg		33°59′44″S 18°28′16″E	Upload Photo
9/2/111/0138/1	2 Richmond Road, Kenilworth, Cape Town		Kenilworth	Wynberg		33°59′44″S 18°28′16″E	Upload Photo
9/2/111/0161	KHAYELITSHA LOCAL AREA GENERAL, WYNBERG DISTRICT		Khayelitsha	Wynberg			Upload Photo
9/2/111/0158	Langa Local Area, General		Langa	Wynberg			Upload Photo
9/2/111/0128/1	Conservation areas, Mowbray, Rosebank, Rondebosch and Silwood, Wynberg			Wynberg			Upload Photo
9/2/111/0064	Mostert's Mill Complex, Mowbray, Cape Town	Mostert's Mill was built in 1796 and was the oldest surviving complete and working windmill in South Africa. It was gutted in a wildfire in the 2021 Table Mountain fire. The fire had started on Table Mountain and spread, severely damaging a number of buildings.	Mowbray	Wynberg		33°57′07″S 18°27′59″E	Mostert's Mill was built in 1796 and was the oldest surviving complete and working windmill in South Africa. It was gutted in a wildfire in the 2021 Table Mountain fire. The fire had started on Table Mountain and spread, severely damaging a number of buildings. Media related to Mostert's Mill at Wikimedia Commons
9/2/111/0064/001	Welgelegen Cemetery, Cape Town	Type of site: Graveyard Current use: Graveyard.	Cape Town, Mowbray	Wynberg	Provincial Heritage Site	33°56′46″S 18°28′34″E	Upload Photo
9/2/111/0064/002	Welgelegen Homestead, Mowbray, Cape Town	Approached through werf, avenue of oaks from north, central gable, central front door with fanlight over (from Civil Service Club) flanked by 2 small windows, tiled roof. The original house on the historic Welgelegen property was drastically altered from 1899 to 1902 according to a design by Sir Herbert Baker. The rebuilt house in the pseudo Cape Dutch style was thereafter made available by Cecil John Rhodes to the Curry family for lifelong use. Type of site: House.	Cape Town, Mowbray	Wynberg	Provincial Heritage Site	33°56′47″S 18°28′26″E	Approached through werf, avenue of oaks from north, central gable, central front door with fanlight over (from Civil Service Club) flanked by 2 small windows, tiled roof. The original house on the historic Welgelegen property was drastically altered from 1899 to 1902 according to a design by Sir Herbert Baker. The rebuilt house in the pseudo Cape Dutch style was thereafter made available by Cecil John Rhodes to the Curry family for lifelong use. Type of site: House.
9/2/111/0064/003	De Meule, Mowbray, Cape Town	Type of site: Farmhouse.	Cape Town, Mowbray	Wynberg	Provincial Heritage Site	33°56′47″S 18°28′26″E	Type of site: Farmhouse.
9/2/111/0064/004	Mostert's Mill, Mowbray, Cape Town	Type of site: Wind Mill Previous use: Mill.	Cape Town, Mowbray	Wynberg	Provincial Heritage Site	33°56′47″S 18°28′26″E	Type of site: Wind Mill Previous use: Mill. Media related to Mostert's Mill at Wikimedia Commons
9/2/111/0064/005	Welgelegen Gateposts, Mowbray, Cape Town	In addition to Mostert’s Mill which has already been mentioned, there are other very interesting buildings on the Welgelegen estate which was granted to Cornelis Stevensz Botma in 1676. Just below the Mill there is a T-shaped house. This is probably the oldest remaining house on the estate and was undoubtedly originally occupied by the miller. A little lower still, but much further back from the road, stands the present house of Welgelegen. It was built by Sir Herbert Baker on the same site where the original double-storeyed dwelling of Welgelegen had stood. A fine gateway gives access to these properties. It was probably built at the end of the eighteenth century by Jacob van Reenen or his son Dirk Gysbert van Reenen who were then the owners of Welgelegen. Type of site: Gate.	Cape Town, Mowbray	Wynberg	Provincial Heritage Site	33°56′47″S 18°28′26″E	Upload Photo
9/2/111/0121	Vredenburg, Mowbray, Cape Town	Type of site: Farmstead.	Cape Town, Mowbray	Wynberg	Provincial Heritage Site	33°57′04″S 18°28′38″E	Upload Photo
9/2/111/0061	NEWLANDS, GENERAL, CAPE TOWN		Newlands	Wynberg			Upload Photo
9/2/111/0028	Tabora, Boshof Avenue, Newlands, Cape Town	Type of site: House.	Cape Town, Newlands	Wynberg	Provincial Heritage Site	33°58′49″S 18°26′54″E	Upload Photo
9/2/111/0031	Mill House, Boundary Road, Newlands, Cape Town	The Mill House was originally built in the 1840s by Jacob Letterstedt for use by the engineer foreman of the adjoining Josephine watermill. In 1862 Letterstedt died and the house was passed to J. Letterstedt and Company, but the engineer continued to live there. Type of site: Mill House. The Mill House with its garden forms an integral part of the historic Josephine Mill complex.	Cape Town, Newlands	Wynberg	Provincial Heritage Site	33°58′12″S 18°28′05″E	The Mill House was originally built in the 1840s by Jacob Letterstedt for use by the engineer foreman of the adjoining Josephine watermill. In 1862 Letterstedt died and the house was passed to J. Letterstedt and Company, but the engineer continued to live there. Type of site: Mill House. The Mill House with its garden forms an integral part of the historic Josephine Mill complex.
9/2/111/0033	Vineyard Hotel, Newlands, Cape Town	The original part of the Vineyard Hotel was built in the Adam style between 1799 and 1800 by Andrew Barnard and his wife, Lady Anne, as a country residence. It was named "The Vineyard" by the Barnards. Type of site: Hotel.	Cape Town, Newlands	Wynberg	Provincial Heritage Site	33°58′30″S 18°28′03″E	Upload Photo
9/2/111/0037	Paradise, Ruins of Lady Anne Barnard's Cottage, Newlands, Cape Town		Newlands	Wynberg			
9/2/111/0039	Glass Bottle Dump, Newlands, Cape Town		Newlands	Wynberg			Upload Photo
9/2/111/0047	Michaelis House, Boys Hostel, Newlands Avenue, Newlands, Cape Town		Newlands	Wynberg			Upload Photo
9/2/111/0062	Mount Pleasant, 10 Newlands Avenue, Newlands, Cape Town	Type of site: House.	Cape Town, Newlands	Wynberg	Provincial Heritage Site	33°58′45″S 18°27′00″E	Upload Photo
9/2/111/0066	Old St Andrew's Church, Palmboom Road, Newlands, Cape Town	At the corner which is formed by Palmboom Road and Newlands Avenue stands the charming little church of St. Andrew. It is a small building but its style of architecture gives it a distinction which pleases and impresses the passer-by. Type of site: Church. Previous use: Church. Current use: Residential. This attractive little church has considerable architectural merit and was built in about 1857.	Cape Town, Newlands	Wynberg	Provincial Heritage Site	33°58′45″S 18°27′00″E	At the corner which is formed by Palmboom Road and Newlands Avenue stands the charming little church of St. Andrew. It is a small building but its style of architecture gives it a distinction which pleases and impresses the passer-by. Type of site: Church. Previous use: Church. Current use: Residential. This attractive little church has considerable architectural merit and was built in about 1857.
9/2/111/0067	St. Andrews Church in the Oaks, 77 Kildare Road, Newlands, Cape Town		Newlands	Wynberg		33°58′26″S 18°27′22″E	Upload Photo
9/2/111/0076	Montebello Stables, 31 Newlands Avenue, Newlands, Cape Town		Newlands	Wynberg		33°58′13″S 18°27′27″E	Upload Photo
9/2/111/0079	Josephine Mill, Newlands, Cape Town	The property known as the Josephine Mill and occasionally Letterstedt's Mill in Boundary road, Newlands, came into the ownership of the Historical Society of Cape Town in 1975 by Deed of Gift from Miss I East. Type of site: Water Mill Current use: Mill / Museum. The Josephine Mill, a watermill built by Jacob Letterstedt in 1840, has close historical links with the nearby brewery, whose original building this same Letterstedt erected in 1859.	Cape Town, Newlands	Wynberg	Provincial Heritage Site	33°58′30″S 18°28′03″E	The property known as the Josephine Mill and occasionally Letterstedt's Mill in Boundary road, Newlands, came into the ownership of the Historical Society of Cape Town in 1975 by Deed of Gift from Miss I East. Type of site: Water Mill Current use: Mill / Museum. The Josephine Mill, a watermill built by Jacob Letterstedt in 1840, has close historical links with the nearby brewery, whose original building this same Letterstedt erected in 1859.
9/2/111/0086	Albion Springs, Main Road, Newlands, Cape Town		Newlands	Wynberg		33°58′03″S 18°28′02″E	Upload Photo
9/2/111/0096	50 Palmboom Road, Newlands, Cape Town		Newlands	Wynberg		33°58′26″S 18°27′31″E	Upload Photo
9/2/111/0104	The Red House, Hiddingh Avenue, Newlands, Cape Town	The rear part of The Red House is believed to have been built before 1729 while the remainder of the house definitely dates from the early nineteenth century. The Red House is consequently one of the oldest houses in Cape Town's southern suburbs. Type of site: House Current use: Residential. The rear part of The Red House is believed to have been built before 1729 while the remainder of the house definitely dates from the early nineteenth century. The Red House is consequently one of the oldest houses in Cape Town's southern suburbs.	Cape Town, Newlands	Wynberg	Provincial Heritage Site	33°58′44″S 18°27′11″E	Upload Photo
9/2/111/0106	Boshof house and gateway, Paradise Road, Newlands, Cape Town		Newlands	Wynberg		33°58′43″S 18°27′00″E	
9/2/111/0106/001	Boshof gateway, Paradise Road, Newlands, Cape Town	Adjoining historic Rondebosch lies Newlands, named so by Ryk Tulbagh when he built a new country residence for the Governor and ploughed up "new lands" there. In 1666 the land that lay in the fork formed by the "old wagon road to the forest" and the main road to the south was granted to the miller and brickmaker W. C. Mostert who called his farm Goed-en-Quaad. Towards the end of the seventeenth century this land and the small adjoining farm Boshof passed into the possession of the chief surgeon, Willem ten Damme. The name Goed-en-Quaad gradually fell into disuse and when the well-known Alexander van Breda acquired the estate towards the end of the eighteenth century, the whole of it was known as Boshof. Van Brecla erected various buildings but the Boshof Gateway is probably one of the few structures that survived. It is situated at the corner of Paradise Road and Boshof Avenue and is one of the finest and best preserved eighteenth century Cape gate ways. It opens into Boshof Avenue, one of the oldest avenues at the Cape. This leads to the old Boshof house with the date 1793 on it, and to Bosbeek extension and Fernwood. This elegant gateway was completely restored by the City Council of Cape Town in 1940. Type of site: Gateway, House.	Cape Town, Newlands	Wynberg	Provincial Heritage Site	33°58′42″S 18°27′00″E	Adjoining historic Rondebosch lies Newlands, named so by Ryk Tulbagh when he built a new country residence for the Governor and ploughed up "new lands" there. In 1666 the land that lay in the fork formed by the "old wagon road to the forest" and the main road to the south was granted to the miller and brickmaker W. C. Mostert who called his farm Goed-en-Quaad. Towards the end of the seventeenth century this land and the small adjoining farm Boshof passed into the possession of the chief surgeon, Willem ten Damme. The name Goed-en-Quaad gradually fell into disuse and when the well-known Alexander van Breda acquired the estate towards the end of the eighteenth century, the whole of it was known as Boshof. Van Brecla erected various buildings but the Boshof Gateway is probably one of the few structures that survived. It is situated at the corner of Paradise Road and Boshof Avenue and is one of the finest and best preserved eighteenth century Cape gate ways. It opens into Boshof Avenue, one of the oldest avenues at the Cape. This leads to the old Boshof house with the date 1793 on it, and to Bosbeek extension and Fernwood. This elegant gateway was completely restored by the City Council of Cape Town in 1940. Type of site: Gateway, House. Media related to Boshof gateway at Wikimedia Commons
9/2/111/0106/002	Boshof, Boshof Avenue, Newlands, Cape Town	The property on which this house is situated originally formed part of the historic Boshof farm owned by Alexander van Breda. The building, the original portion of which dates from the early nineteenth century, was enlarged and Victorianised during the 1840s.	Cape Town, Newlands	Wynberg	Provincial Heritage Site	33°58′48″S 18°26′54″E	The property on which this house is situated originally formed part of the historic Boshof farm owned by Alexander van Breda. The building, the original portion of which dates from the early nineteenth century, was enlarged and Victorianised during the 1840s.
9/2/111/0113	Long Cottage, Newlands Avenue, Newlands, Cape Town		Cape Town, Newlands	Wynberg	Provincial Heritage Site	33°58′45″S 18°27′00″E	Upload Photo
9/2/111/0125	Athenaeum, 154 Campground Road, Newlands, Cape Town		Newlands	Wynberg		33°58′34″S 18°28′03″E	Upload Photo
9/2/111/0132	Newlands Spring, Newlands, Cape Town		Newlands	Wynberg			Upload Photo
9/2/111/0133	South African Breweries, 3 Main Road, Newlands, Cape Town	Type of site: Brewery.	Cape Town, Newlands	Wynberg	Provincial Heritage Site	33°58′21″S 18°27′54″E	Upload Photo
9/2/111/0137	Montebello House, Newlands Avenue, Newlands, Cape Town		Newlands	Wynberg		33°58′13″S 18°27′27″E	Media related to Montebello Design Centre at Wikimedia Commons
9/2/111/0146	Kelvin Grove, Campground Road, Newlands		Newlands	Wynberg		33°58′16″S 18°28′13″E	Upload Photo
9/2/111/0147	Fernwood Newlands, Wynberg District		Newlands	Wynberg		33°58′45″S 18°26′48″E	Upload Photo
9/2/111/0156	House Raynham, 16 Boshof Avenue, Newlands		Newlands	Wynberg		33°58′49″S 18°26′52″E	Upload Photo
9/2/111/0148	NYANGA/CROSSROADS LOCAL AREA, GENERAL		Nyanga	Wynberg			Upload Photo
9/2/111/0162	PHILIPPI LOCAL AREA GENERAL, WYNBERG DISTRICT		Philippi	Wynberg			Upload Photo
9/2/111/0152	Evangelical Lutheran Church, Philippi, Wynberg District		Philippi	Wynberg			Upload Photo
9/2/111/0160	PLUMSTEAD LOCAL AREA GENERAL, WYNBERG DISTRICT		Plumstead	Wynberg			Upload Photo
9/2/111/0005	Eaton Rehabilitation Hospital, Main Road, Plumstead, Cape Town		Plumstead	Wynberg			Upload Photo
9/2/111/0018	Meyerhof, Meyer Street, Plumstead, Cape Town		Cape Town, Plumstead	Wynberg	Provincial Heritage Site	34°01′36″S 18°28′13″E	Upload Photo
9/2/111/0078	Burial Vault of John George Ratherfelder, Selby Road, Plumstead, Cape		Plumstead	Wynberg			Upload Photo
9/2/111/0063	RETREAT, GENERAL, CAPE TOWN		Retreat	Wynberg			Upload Photo
9/2/111/0041	RONDEBOSCH, CAPE TOWN, GENERAL		Rondebosch	Wynberg			Upload Photo
9/2/111/0029	Old Masonic Temple, Main Road, Rondebosch, Cape Town		Rondebosch	Wynberg			
9/2/111/0030	Old Sasko Building, Belmont Road, Rondebosch, Cape Town		Rondebosch	Wynberg			Upload Photo
9/2/111/0035	Rondebosch Railway Station, Rondebosch, Cape Town		Rondebosch	Wynberg		33°57′44″S 18°28′21″E	Upload Photo
9/2/111/0036	Rondebosch Fountain, Main Road, Rondebosch, Cape Town	On a traffic island where Belmont Road meets the main road in the centre of Rondebosch stands one of the best-known landmarks in that suburb. It is known as "The Fountain", but it is actually an ornamental trough for watering horses, dating back to 1891. Type of site: Fountain.	Cape Town, Rondebosch	Wynberg	Provincial Heritage Site	33°58′37″S 18°27′53″E	On a traffic island where Belmont Road meets the main road in the centre of Rondebosch stands one of the best-known landmarks in that suburb. It is known as "The Fountain", but it is actually an ornamental trough for watering horses, dating back to 1891. Type of site: Fountain. Media related to Rondebosch Fountain at Wikimedia Commons
9/2/111/0038	Rhodes Recreation Grounds, Chapel Road, Rondebosch, Cape Town	Main article: SS Mendi	Rondebosch	Wynberg		33°57′14″S 18°28′06″E	Main article: SS Mendi
9/2/111/0042	Rustenburg Girls Primary School, Rondebosch, Cape Town	Main article: Rustenburg School for Girls	Rondebosch	Wynberg		33°57′24″S 18°28′44″E	Main article: Rustenburg School for Girls
9/2/111/0043	6 Glade Road, Rondebosch, Cape Town		Rondebosch	Wynberg		33°57′52″S 18°28′25″E	Upload Photo
9/2/111/0057	University of Cape Town, Rondebosch, Cape Town	Main article: University of Cape Town This unique group of buildings in the Classical Revival style, together with the open spaces, constitute the original Campus Plan as designed by, the architect J. M. Solomon in 1918.	Cape Town, Rondebosch	Wynberg	Provincial Heritage Site	33°57′28″S 18°27′40″E	This unique group of buildings in the Classical Revival style, together with the open spaces, constitute the original Campus Plan as designed by, the architect J. M. Solomon in 1918. Media related to University of Cape Town at Wikimedia Commons
9/2/111/0057/001	The Summer House, Belvedere, Middle Campus, University of Cape Town, Rondebosch, Cape Town	This Summer House with the benches on either side, was built by the Dutch East India Company on the Rustenburg Estates. The Summer House, also known as Belvedere, was built by the Dutch East India Company on the Rustenburg Estate. The building, which is probably the oldest existing building in South Africa, was reconstructed by Sir Herbert Baker in 1894. It formed the focal point of an avenue of oak trees running up the hillside from Rustenburg House, and which, on the instigation of Cecil John Rhodes, was replanted with plumbago, japonica, jacaranda and turkey oaks. Part of this walk still exists and is known as the Japonica Walk. Type of site: Folly.	Cape Town, Rondebosch	Wynberg	Provincial Heritage Site	33°57′29″S 18°27′50″E	This Summer House with the benches on either side, was built by the Dutch East India Company on the Rustenburg Estates. The Summer House, also known as Belvedere, was built by the Dutch East India Company on the Rustenburg Estate. The building, which is probably the oldest existing building in South Africa, was reconstructed by Sir Herbert Baker in 1894. It formed the focal point of an avenue of oak trees running up the hillside from Rustenburg House, and which, on the instigation of Cecil John Rhodes, was replanted with plumbago, japonica, jacaranda and turkey oaks. Part of this walk still exists and is known as the Japonica Walk. Type of site: Folly.
9/2/111/0057/2	Arts Block, University of Cape Town, Rondebosch, Cape Town		Rondebosch	Wynberg		33°57′30″S 18°27′40″E	Upload Photo
9/2/111/0070	Felday, 4 Erin Road, Rondebosch, Cape Town		Rondebosch	Wynberg		33°57′38″S 18°28′36″E	Upload Photo
9/2/111/0072	Groote Schuur Estate, Rondebosch, Cape Town		Rondebosch	Wynberg		33°58′08″S 18°28′25″E	Media related to Groote Schuur Estate at Wikimedia Commons
9/2/111/0072/001	Groote Schuur, Rondebosch, Cape Town	Main article: Groote Schuur Type of site: House. Current use: House.	Cape Town, Rondebosch	Wynberg	Provincial Heritage Site	33°57′47″S 18°28′04″E	Type of site: House. Current use: House. Media related to Groote Schuur Estate at Wikimedia Commons
9/2/111/0072/002	Contents of Groote Schuur, Rondebosch, Cape Town		Cape Town, Rondebosch	Wynberg	Heritage Object		Upload Photo
9/2/111/0072/003	Kleine Schuur, Groote Schuur Estate, Rondebosch, Cape Town	Type of site: House. Current use: House.	Cape Town, Rondebosch	Wynberg	Provincial Heritage Site	33°57′44″S 18°28′21″E	Upload Photo
9/2/111/0072/004	Genadendal, Groote Schuur Estate, Rondebosch, Cape Town	Type of site: House. Current use: House.	Cape Town, Rondebosch	Wynberg	Provincial Heritage Site	33°57′44″S 18°28′21″E	Upload Photo
9/2/111/0072/5	Groote Schuur Zoo Site, Cape Town		Rondebosch	Wynberg		33°57′40″S 18°27′35″E	
9/2/111/0101	Rustenburg House, Rondebosch, Cape Town	When Jan van Riebeeck granted land at "het ronde doornbosje" in 1657 to the first free burghers, he reserved a piece of land for an orchard for the use of the Company. It extended from the Liesbeek River right across the old wagon road up to what is now Type of site: Cape House. This unique group of buildings in the Classical Revival style, together with the open spaces, constitute the original Campus Plan as designed by, the architect J. M. Solomon in 1918.	Cape Town, Rondebosch	Wynberg	Provincial Heritage Site	33°57′44″S 18°28′21″E	When Jan van Riebeeck granted land at "het ronde doornbosje" in 1657 to the first free burghers, he reserved a piece of land for an orchard for the use of the Company. It extended from the Liesbeek River right across the old wagon road up to what is now Type of site: Cape House. This unique group of buildings in the Classical Revival style, together with the open spaces, constitute the original Campus Plan as designed by, the architect J. M. Solomon in 1918.
9/2/111/0102	Rondebosch Common, Rondebosch, Cape Town	The Rondebosch Common is situated almost opposite the Rustenburg estate and fully two kilometres east of the Liesbeek River. In 1805, during the preparations for defending the Cape against a British attack, General Janssens’s Batavian force was camped on a large area which included what is now the Rondebosch Common. Dysentery broke out amongst the troops and General Janssen’s seventeen-year-old son, a recruit, was one of those who succumbed to the epidemic. The force was then moved to higher terrain at Wynberg. After the occupation of the Cape the land at Rondebosch continued to be used as a camping place for British troops for a number of years, up to the time of Lord Charles Somerset. This is why the street that borders on the Western side of the present Common was called Camp Ground Road. At the request of Bishop Gray, the first Anglican Bishop in South Africa, Governor Cathcart in 1855 granted the right to graze cattle on the Common to the Rector of St. Paul's Church, Rondebosch, with the proviso that the public was always to enjoy access to the area. At the same time two adjoining pieces of land on the Common were given to the Wesleyan and Mohammedan communities for use as graveyards. Pine trees were planted round them, and this is the origin of the cluster of pine trees we see on the Common today. In 1870 it was transferred to the Municipality	Cape Town, Rondebosch	Wynberg	Provincial Heritage Site	33°57′22″S 18°28′57″E	The Rondebosch Common is situated almost opposite the Rustenburg estate and fully two kilometres east of the Liesbeek River. In 1805, during the preparations for defending the Cape against a British attack, General Janssens’s Batavian force was camped on a large area which included what is now the Rondebosch Common. Dysentery broke out amongst the troops and General Janssen’s seventeen-year-old son, a recruit, was one of those who succumbed to the epidemic. The force was then moved to higher terrain at Wynberg. After the occupation of the Cape the land at Rondebosch continued to be used as a camping place for British troops for a number of years, up to the time of Lord Charles Somerset. This is why the street that borders on the Western side of the present Common was called Camp Ground Road. At the request of Bishop Gray, the first Anglican Bishop in South Africa, Governor Cathcart in 1855 granted the right to graze cattle on the Common to the Rector of St. Paul's Church, Rondebosch, with the proviso that the public was always to enjoy access to the area. At the same time two adjoining pieces of land on the Common were given to the Wesleyan and Mohammedan communities for use as graveyards. Pine trees were planted round them, and this is the origin of the cluster of pine trees we see on the Common today. In 1870 it was transferred to the Municipality Media related to Rondebosch Common at Wikimedia Commons
9/2/111/0105	St Paul's Church, Church Street, Rondebosch, Cape Town	The land on which St. Paul's Church was erected, was granted by Governor Sir Lowry Cole on 30 August 1832 and is one of the earliest land grants to an Anglican Parish in South Africa. The site was consecrated by Bishop Daniel Wilson on 5 September 1832. The original neo-Gothic church was opened on 16 February 1834. In 1845 a gallery was added. Thereafter the church was considerably enlarged. Type of site: Church Current use: Church : Anglican.	Cape Town, Rondebosch	Wynberg	Provincial Heritage Site	33°57′44″S 18°28′09″E	The land on which St. Paul's Church was erected, was granted by Governor Sir Lowry Cole on 30 August 1832 and is one of the earliest land grants to an Anglican Parish in South Africa. The site was consecrated by Bishop Daniel Wilson on 5 September 1832. The original neo-Gothic church was opened on 16 February 1834. In 1845 a gallery was added. Thereafter the church was considerably enlarged. Type of site: Church Current use: Church : Anglican. Media related to St Paul's Church Rondebosch at Wikimedia Commons
9/2/111/0110	Woolsack, Rondebosch, Cape Town	This residence, with its interesting mixture of Cape Dutch and neo-classical features, was rebuilt by Sir Herbert Baker for the use of poets and artists on the instructions of Cecil John Rhodes. Rudyard Kipling and his family stayed here during the summer months from 1900 to 1907. The property was transferred to the University in 1980. Type of site: House.	Cape Town, Rondebosch	Wynberg	Provincial Heritage Site	33°57′19″S 18°28′04″E	This residence, with its interesting mixture of Cape Dutch and neo-classical features, was rebuilt by Sir Herbert Baker for the use of poets and artists on the instructions of Cecil John Rhodes. Rudyard Kipling and his family stayed here during the summer months from 1900 to 1907. The property was transferred to the University in 1980. Type of site: House. Media related to The Woolsack, Rondebosch at Wikimedia Commons
9/2/111/0118	Glenara, Rondebosch, Cape Town	This impressive Victorian double-storeyed house was designed by the architect A. W. Ackerman and built by one Mannix for Lewis Anthony Vintcent from 1882 to 1883.The building has been used since 1925 as the official residence for principals of the University of Cape Town Type of site: House.	Cape Town, Rondebosch	Wynberg	Provincial Heritage Site	33°57′28″S 18°28′12″E	Upload Photo
9/2/111/0119	Rondebosch Boys' Preparatory School, Campground Road, Rondebosch, Cape		Rondebosch	Wynberg		33°57′52″S 18°28′31″E	Media related to Rondebosch Boys' Preparatory School at Wikimedia Commons
9/2/111/0123	Rhodes Memorial, Rondebosch, Cape Town		Rondebosch	Wynberg		33°57′09″S 18°27′34″E	Media related to Rhodes Memorial at Wikimedia Commons
9/2/111/0124	Marsh Memorial homes, Norton Way, Rondebosch, Cape Town		Rondebosch	Wynberg		33°57′54″S 18°29′36″E	Upload Photo
9/2/111/0129	ROSEBANK, CAPE TOWN, GENERAL		Rosebank	Wynberg			Upload Photo
9/2/018/0089	Whitby House, 3 Barry Avenue, Rosebank, Cape Town	Type of site: House.	Cape Town, Rosebank	Wynberg	Provincial Heritage Site	33°57′12″S 18°28′15″E	Upload Photo
9/2/111/0082	19 Annerley Road, Rosebank, Cape Town		Rosebank	Wynberg		33°58′13″S 18°27′27″E	Upload Photo
9/2/111/0083	38 Sawkins Road, Rosebank, Cape Town		Rosebank	Wynberg		33°57′06″S 18°28′58″E	Upload Photo
9/2/111/0135	43 Liesbeeck Road, Rosebank, Cape Town		Rosebank	Wynberg		33°57′07″S 18°28′41″E	Upload Photo
9/2/111/0136	Irma Stern Museum, Cecil Road, Rosebank, Cape Town		Rosebank	Wynberg		33°57′11″S 18°28′10″E	Upload Photo
9/2/111/0071	Tokai Manor House, Porter Reformatory, Tokai, Constantia, Wynberg District	Tokai is situated almost due south of Groot Constantia up against the Steenberg mountain, on a portion of Simon van der Stel's former grazing lands. Tokai Road runs in a direct line from the main road to this stately old farm. The Manor House was built shortly after 1792 by Jan Andreas Rauch and is one of the most famous examples of Cape Dutch architecture. Type of site: Farmstead.	Cape Town, Tokai	Wynberg	Provincial Heritage Site	34°03′34″S 18°25′00″E	Tokai is situated almost due south of Groot Constantia up against the Steenberg mountain, on a portion of Simon van der Stel's former grazing lands. Tokai Road runs in a direct line from the main road to this stately old farm. The Manor House was built shortly after 1792 by Jan Andreas Rauch and is one of the most famous examples of Cape Dutch architecture. Type of site: Farmstead.
9/2/111/0017	Tokai Arboretum, Tokai Forest, Wynberg District	The South African forest industry had its beginnings on this site when Joseph Storr Lister, Conservator of Forests of the Western Conservancy of the Cape Colony, laid out this impressive arboretum in 1885. The arboretum is world-famous among botanists.	Cape Town, Tokai	Wynberg	Provincial Heritage Site	34°03′45″S 18°26′30″E	The South African forest industry had its beginnings on this site when Joseph Storr Lister, Conservator of Forests of the Western Conservancy of the Cape Colony, laid out this impressive arboretum in 1885. The arboretum is world-famous among botanists.
9/2/111/0019	Silviculturist Dwellings Nos 1 & 535, Tokai Forest, Wynberg District		Tokai	Wynberg			Upload Photo
9/2/111/0001	Old Cemeteries, Wynberg, Cape Town		Wynberg	Wynberg			
9/2/111/0001/001	Dutch Reformed Church Cemetery, Wynberg, Cape Town	Type of site: Graveyard Current use: Graveyard.	Cape Town, Wynberg	Wynberg	Provincial Heritage Site, War grave	34°00′17″S 18°28′17″E	Type of site: Graveyard Current use: Graveyard.
9/2/111/0001/2	St John's Anglican Cemetery, Wynberg, Cape Town		Wynberg	Wynberg			Upload Photo
9/2/111/0001/3	Garden of Remembrance, D R Church, Wynberg, Cape Town		Wynberg	Wynberg		34°00′17″S 18°27′43″E	Upload Photo
9/2/111/0001/4	Methodist Cemetery, Church Street, Wynberg		Wynberg	Wynberg		34°00′15″S 18°28′01″E	Upload Photo
9/2/111/0002-001	Leather Bottle, 7 Standard Lane, Wynberg, Cape Town	Modern rebuild after fire. Free-standing single storey cottage with attic; full hipped roof, unpainted modern stock casement windows, dormers and French doors; extensive brick paving. New extension with parapet and plaster mouldings; modern stock sash windows. Type of site: House Current use: House.	Cape Town, Wynberg	Wynberg	Provincial Heritage Site	34°00′21″S 18°27′46″E	Upload Photo
9/2/111/0002-010	The Armoury, 14 Wolfe Street, Wynberg, Cape Town	Free-standing single storey cottage with attic; opens onto sidewalk; double pitched roof with IBR sheeting and bargeboards; sash windows (24 panes) and louvred shutters; solid panelled door with small fanlight above. Type of site: House. Current use: House.	Cape Town, Wynberg	Wynberg	Provincial Heritage Site	34°00′27″S 18°27′49″E	Free-standing single storey cottage with attic; opens onto sidewalk; double pitched roof with IBR sheeting and bargeboards; sash windows (24 panes) and louvred shutters; solid panelled door with small fanlight above. Type of site: House. Current use: House.
9/2/111/0002-011	49-51 Durban Road, Wynberg, Cape Town	Free-standing single storey cottage with attic, now subdivided into two units; short setback from sidewalk; half hipped corrugated iron roof; unpainted modern stock sash windows (24 panes) and panelled doors. Type of site: House Current use: House.	Cape Town, Wynberg	Wynberg	Provincial Heritage Site	34°00′30″S 18°27′49″E	Upload Photo
9/2/111/0002-015	5 Wolfe Street cnr Camp Road, Wynberg, Cape Town	Single storey semi-detached building now used as a shop; double pitched roof with asbestos cement sheeting and bargeboards; ashlared plasterwork. Projecting portion: new fixed shopfront windows (4 panes); a typical glazed Victorian double leafed panelled door. Type of site: Commercial Current use: Personal services.	Cape Town, Wynberg	Wynberg	Provincial Heritage Site	34°00′28″S 18°27′46″E	Upload Photo
9/2/111/0002-016	Prince Alfred House, Wynberg, Cape Town	This double-storeyed house is built in the Georgian style and dates from the fifties of the nineteenth century. It is one of the most important houses in the historic centre of Wynberg.	Cape Town, Wynberg	Wynberg	Provincial Heritage Site	34°00′17″S 18°28′17″E	Upload Photo
9/2/111/0002-017	Laundry Cottage, Durban Road, Wynberg, Cape Town	Free-standing single storey l-shaped cottage with low stoep wall; almost matches 'Oak Cottage' in detailing (F & C); full hipped thatch roof; early sash windows (24 panes) and half window height louvred shutters; double leaf front door with small paned Type of site: House Current use: House.	Cape Town, Wynberg	Wynberg	Provincial Heritage Site	34°00′27″S 18°27′46″E	Upload Photo
9/2/111/0002-019	13 Durban Road, Wynberg, Cape Town	Free-standing single storey cottage now subdivided into two dwellings; double pitched roof with Canadian pattern asbestos cement sheeting and bargeboards; unpainted modern stock sash windows (12 panes) and French doors; original stoep now enclosed; high Type of site: House Current use: House.	Cape Town, Wynberg	Wynberg	Provincial Heritage Site	34°00′21″S 18°27′44″E	Upload Photo
9/2/111/0002-020	Prince Alfred Arms and Prince Alfred Cottage, 14 and 16 Durban Road, Wynberg, Cape Town	Semi-detached single storey vernacular cottage together with no 2.15; originally the tavern to no 2.13; full hipped corrugated iron roof; gable with plaster moulding at splayed corner added later; sash window and louvred shutters to east end; Type of site: House Current use: House.	Cape Town, Wynberg	Wynberg	Provincial Heritage Site	34°00′20″S 18°27′44″E	Semi-detached single storey vernacular cottage together with no 2.15; originally the tavern to no 2.13; full hipped corrugated iron roof; gable with plaster moulding at splayed corner added later; sash window and louvred shutters to east end; Type of site: House Current use: House.
9/2/111/0002-021	Chelsea Gardens, 65 Durban Road, Wynberg, Cape Town	Modern double storey block of flats. Type of site: House Current use: Flats.	Cape Town, Wynberg	Wynberg	Provincial Heritage Site	34°00′20″S 18°27′44″E	Upload Photo
9/2/111/0002-022	Klein Maynard, 59 Wolfe Street, Wynberg, Cape Town	Free-standing single storey vernacular cottage; double pitched full hipped corrugated iron roof; stippled plaster walls with quoining at corners and moulding around front door; double casement windows with fanlights and louvred shutters; Victorian sash Type of site: House Current use: House.	Cape Town, Wynberg	Wynberg	Provincial Heritage Site	34°00′18″S 18°27′49″E	Free-standing single storey vernacular cottage; double pitched full hipped corrugated iron roof; stippled plaster walls with quoining at corners and moulding around front door; double casement windows with fanlights and louvred shutters; Victorian sash Type of site: House Current use: House.
9/2/111/0002-023	Clarence, 3 Victoria Street, Wynberg, Cape Town	Free-standing extensively altered single storey cottage with attic; full hipped thatched roof; sash windows with leaded lights and solid shutters; double casement dormer windows; all joinery unpainted and appears to be modern stock; raised stoep with end Type of site: House Current use: House.	Cape Town, Wynberg	Wynberg	Provincial Heritage Site	34°00′31″S 18°27′46″E	Free-standing extensively altered single storey cottage with attic; full hipped thatched roof; sash windows with leaded lights and solid shutters; double casement dormer windows; all joinery unpainted and appears to be modern stock; raised stoep with end Type of site: House Current use: House.
9/2/111/0002-024	Albert, 5 Victoria Street, Wynberg, Cape Town	Semi-detached single storey cottage with various additions; full hipped thatched roof with a double pitched projecting bay on the east side and a parapet with flat roof behind on the west side; sash windows (12 panes) and louvred shutters; solid panelled Type of site: House Current use: House.	Cape Town, Wynberg	Wynberg	Provincial Heritage Site	34°00′31″S 18°27′46″E	Semi-detached single storey cottage with various additions; full hipped thatched roof with a double pitched projecting bay on the east side and a parapet with flat roof behind on the west side; sash windows (12 panes) and louvred shutters; solid panelled Type of site: House Current use: House.
9/2/111/0002-025	Victoria, 7 Victoria Street, Wynberg, Cape Town	Semi-detached single storey cottage with various additions; full hipped thatched roof with a double pitched projecting bay on the east side and a parapet with flat roof behind on the west side; sash windows (12 panes) and louvred shutters; solid panelled Type of site: House Current use: House.	Cape Town, Wynberg	Wynberg	Provincial Heritage Site	34°00′31″S 18°27′46″E	Semi-detached single storey cottage with various additions; full hipped thatched roof with a double pitched projecting bay on the east side and a parapet with flat roof behind on the west side; sash windows (12 panes) and louvred shutters; solid panelled Type of site: House Current use: House.
9/2/111/0002-026	Fiamma's Restaurant, 23 Wolfe Street, Wynberg, Cape Town	Single storey building with attic, now subdivided into a restaurant and two dwellings; intermediate entrance level on Riebeeck Street; full hipped corrugated iron roof; large double casement dormer windows; possibly enclosed stoep with malthoid roof; Type of site: House Current use: House.	Cape Town, Wynberg	Wynberg	Provincial Heritage Site	34°00′23″S 18°27′49″E	Single storey building with attic, now subdivided into a restaurant and two dwellings; intermediate entrance level on Riebeeck Street; full hipped corrugated iron roof; large double casement dormer windows; possibly enclosed stoep with malthoid roof; Type of site: House Current use: House.
9/2/111/0002-027	The Muse, 43 Wolfe Street, Wynberg, Cape Town	Semi-detached double storey dwelling probably Victorianised. Full hipped corrugated iron roof; plaster quoining around upper floor openings; and a plaster band at position of removed verandah; sash windows of later Victorian type, lower floor probably mo Type of site: House Current use: House.	Cape Town, Wynberg	Wynberg	Provincial Heritage Site	34°00′18″S 18°27′49″E	Semi-detached double storey dwelling probably Victorianised. Full hipped corrugated iron roof; plaster quoining around upper floor openings; and a plaster band at position of removed verandah; sash windows of later Victorian type, lower floor probably mo Type of site: House Current use: House.
9/2/111/0002-028	Waterloo Edge, Young Lane, Wynberg, Cape Town	Semi-detached single storey vernacular cottage; full hipped roof with asbestos cement tiles. Facade facing Durban Road: sash windows (12 panes) and louvred shutters; double leafed modern stock French door; intrusive unpainted modern garage door; Type of site: House Current use: House.	Cape Town, Wynberg	Wynberg	Provincial Heritage Site	34°00′18″S 18°27′45″E	Semi-detached single storey vernacular cottage; full hipped roof with asbestos cement tiles. Facade facing Durban Road: sash windows (12 panes) and louvred shutters; double leafed modern stock French door; intrusive unpainted modern garage door; Type of site: House Current use: House.
9/2/111/0002-029	3 Moore Road, Wynberg, Cape Town		Cape Town, Wynberg	Wynberg	Provincial Heritage Site	34°00′31″S 18°27′47″E	Upload Photo
9/2/111/0002-030	5 Moore Road, Wynberg, Cape Town		Cape Town, Wynberg	Wynberg	Provincial Heritage Site	34°00′31″S 18°27′47″E	Upload Photo
9/2/111/0002-031	7 Moore Road, Wynberg, Cape Town		Cape Town, Wynberg	Wynberg	Provincial Heritage Site	34°00′31″S 18°27′47″E	Upload Photo
9/2/111/0002-032	9 Moore Road, Wynberg, Cape Town		Cape Town, Wynberg	Wynberg	Provincial Heritage Site	34°00′31″S 18°27′47″E	Upload Photo
9/2/111/0002-033	Riebeeck House, Riebeeck Street, Wynberg, Cape Town	Free-standing single storey vernacular cottage; half-hipped patent metal 'tile' roof; sash windows (24 panes); modern stock satble door with fanlight; raised stoep on street edge with low stoep walls at ends and wrought iron railing infill. Type of site: House Current use: House.	Cape Town, Wynberg	Wynberg	Provincial Heritage Site	34°00′30″S 18°27′58″E	Free-standing single storey vernacular cottage; half-hipped patent metal 'tile' roof; sash windows (24 panes); modern stock satble door with fanlight; raised stoep on street edge with low stoep walls at ends and wrought iron railing infill. Type of site: House Current use: House.
9/2/111/0002-034	Quellerie Cottage, Riebeeck Street, Wynberg, Cape Town	Single storey dwelling attached to the old 'Municipal Offices'; half-hipped malthoid roof; ashlared plasterwork; sash windows (24 panes); modern stock unpainted timber louvred shutters; modern stock unpainted door with canvas canopy over front door; raise Type of site: House Current use: House.	Cape Town, Wynberg	Wynberg	Provincial Heritage Site	34°00′24″S 18°27′45″E	Upload Photo
9/2/111/0002-035	Delfshaven, Waterloo Road, Wynberg, Cape Town	Semi-detached double storey vernacular house; full hipped Welsh slate roof. Facade facing Lonsdale Street: sash windows (24 panes) double leafed panelled door with small paned glazing at splayed corner; steel posts supporting a corrugated iron roof Type of site: House Current use: House.	Cape Town, Wynberg	Wynberg	Provincial Heritage Site	34°00′30″S 18°27′43″E	Upload Photo
9/2/111/0002/004	Kleine Oude, 1 Durban Road, Wynberg, Cape Town	Free-standing single storey vernacular cottage with attic; thatched roof: half-hip facing Carr's Hill and full hip facing Waterloo Road; Various modern casement windows, some with leaded lights; double casement dormer windows; doors with leaded lights; Type of site: House Current use: House.	Cape Town, Wynberg	Wynberg	Provincial Heritage Site	34°00′33″S 18°27′52″E	Free-standing single storey vernacular cottage with attic; thatched roof: half-hip facing Carr's Hill and full hip facing Waterloo Road; Various modern casement windows, some with leaded lights; double casement dormer windows; doors with leaded lights; Type of site: House Current use: House.
9/2/111/0002/006	Building, corner of Lonsdale and Wolfe Street, Wynberg, Cape Town	Semi-detached double storey Victorian commercial building with splayed corner treatment and a corner turret with pressed steel tiles; typical Victorian plaster detailing with elaborate moulding around windows and pronounced eaves treatment; typical timber Type of site: Commercial Current use: Offices. The historic Old Wynberg Village is an area of considerable character, as well as being of historical, architectural and environmental importance. It is one of the few areas close to the City of Cape Town which have retained their historical character.	Cape Town, Wynberg	Wynberg	Provincial Heritage Site	34°00′25″S 18°27′48″E	Semi-detached double storey Victorian commercial building with splayed corner treatment and a corner turret with pressed steel tiles; typical Victorian plaster detailing with elaborate moulding around windows and pronounced eaves treatment; typical timber Type of site: Commercial Current use: Offices. The historic Old Wynberg Village is an area of considerable character, as well as being of historical, architectural and environmental importance. It is one of the few areas close to the City of Cape Town which have retained their historical character.
9/2/111/0002/007	Beauchamps Place, 5 and 7 Riebeeck Street cnr 27 Wolfe Street, Wynberg, Cape Town	Double storey flats; full hipped corrugated iron roof; small-paned double casement windows with fanlights to ground floor; unpainted typical Victorian sash windows (4 panes) and louvred shutters to upper floor; double storey plastered solid verandah Type of site: House Current use: Flats.	Cape Town, Wynberg	Wynberg	Provincial Heritage Site	34°00′23″S 18°27′49″E	Double storey flats; full hipped corrugated iron roof; small-paned double casement windows with fanlights to ground floor; unpainted typical Victorian sash windows (4 panes) and louvred shutters to upper floor; double storey plastered solid verandah Type of site: House Current use: Flats.
9/2/111/0002/009	Falcon House, 21 Durban Road, Wynberg, Cape Town	Free-standing single storey cottage with attic; a large full hipped corrugated iron roof; sash windows (12 panes) and casement windows to attic; double leafed door with fanlight; curved verandah roof removed on front facade but precast concrete columns Type of site: House Current use: House.	Cape Town, Wynberg	Wynberg	Provincial Heritage Site	34°00′20″S 18°27′44″E	Free-standing single storey cottage with attic; a large full hipped corrugated iron roof; sash windows (12 panes) and casement windows to attic; double leafed door with fanlight; curved verandah roof removed on front facade but precast concrete columns Type of site: House Current use: House.
9/2/111/0002/010	3-4 Riebeeck Street, Wynberg, Cape Town	Free-standing single storey vernacular cottage; full hipped corrugated iron roof behind a parapet wall; sash windows with leaded lights; modern stock stable door; stoep enclosed creating two projecting wings and a recessed entrance doorway; low plastered Type of site: House Current use: House.	Cape Town, Wynberg	Wynberg	Provincial Heritage Site	34°00′23″S 18°27′47″E	Free-standing single storey vernacular cottage; full hipped corrugated iron roof behind a parapet wall; sash windows with leaded lights; modern stock stable door; stoep enclosed creating two projecting wings and a recessed entrance doorway; low plastered Type of site: House Current use: House.
9/2/111/0002/011	Osborne House, Wolfe Street, Wynberg, Cape Town	Free-standing single storey partly Victorianised cottage on large piece of ground well set back from the street; full hipped thatch roof; simple plaster frame moulding around doors and windows; earlier sashes (c. 1850) in rear of building; double leaf door Type of site: House Current use: House.	Cape Town, Wynberg	Wynberg	Provincial Heritage Site	34°00′25″S 18°27′48″E	Upload Photo
9/2/111/0002/012	Drew House, Durban Road, Wynberg, Cape Town	Free-standing single stately house now subdivided into smaller units; low pitched full hipped welsh slate roof; possibly original sash windows (24 panes); double leafed panelled door with unsuitable modern 'period' timber door surround; raised open stoep Type of site: House Current use: House.	Cape Town, Wynberg	Wynberg	Provincial Heritage Site	34°00′27″S 18°27′46″E	Free-standing single stately house now subdivided into smaller units; low pitched full hipped welsh slate roof; possibly original sash windows (24 panes); double leafed panelled door with unsuitable modern 'period' timber door surround; raised open stoep Type of site: House Current use: House.
9/2/111/0002/014	1 Carr Hill, Wynberg, Cape Town	Attached double storey vernacular dwelling; double pitched corrugated iron roof with bargeboards; ashlar plaster decoration to walls; all joinery unpainted. Ground floor: 3-bays; modern stock timber sash windows (12 panes); plaster quoining around window Type of site: Commercial Current use: Offices.	Cape Town, Wynberg	Wynberg	Provincial Heritage Site	34°00′30″S 18°27′58″E	Attached double storey vernacular dwelling; double pitched corrugated iron roof with bargeboards; ashlar plaster decoration to walls; all joinery unpainted. Ground floor: 3-bays; modern stock timber sash windows (12 panes); plaster quoining around window Type of site: Commercial Current use: Offices.
9/2/111/0002/015	50 Wolfe Street, Wynberg, Cape Town		Cape Town, Wynberg	Wynberg	Provincial Heritage Site	34°00′18″S 18°27′49″E	Upload Photo
9/2/111/0002/016	29 Wolfe Street, Wynberg, Cape Town	Free-standing single storey vernacular cottage; stepped parapet wall with plaster mouldings and full hipped corrugated iron roof behind; sash windows (12 panes); unpainted timber window frames and shutters; unpainted panelled door with fanlight and small Type of site: House Current use: House.	Cape Town, Wynberg	Wynberg	Provincial Heritage Site	34°00′23″S 18°27′48″E	Free-standing single storey vernacular cottage; stepped parapet wall with plaster mouldings and full hipped corrugated iron roof behind; sash windows (12 panes); unpainted timber window frames and shutters; unpainted panelled door with fanlight and small Type of site: House Current use: House.
9/2/111/0002/017	37 Waterloo Road, Wynberg, Cape Town	Free-standing single storey cottage set well back from street, with internal floor below external ground level; parapet wall with elaborate plaster mouldings and IBR behind; typical Victorian sash windows (4 panes) and louvred shutters; various garden Type of site: House Current use: House.	Cape Town, Wynberg	Wynberg	Provincial Heritage Site	34°00′04″S 18°27′44″E	Upload Photo
9/2/111/0002/019	5-7 Durban Road, Wynberg, Cape Town	Semi-detached single storey dwellings; parapet wall with plaster mouldings; stippled plaster to walls; painted steel casement windows; stable doors with glazing; new partially enclosed arched porches; low boundary hedge; two adjoining garages. Type of site: House Current use: House.	Cape Town, Wynberg	Wynberg	Provincial Heritage Site	34°00′21″S 18°27′44″E	Semi-detached single storey dwellings; parapet wall with plaster mouldings; stippled plaster to walls; painted steel casement windows; stable doors with glazing; new partially enclosed arched porches; low boundary hedge; two adjoining garages. Type of site: House Current use: House.
9/2/111/0002/020	Vredenhof, 59 Durban Road, Wynberg, Cape Town	Free-standing vernacular cottage with outbuildings behind with quite extensive alterations having taken place at various stages; facade facing Durban Road single storey becoming double storey at back; full hipped corrugated iron roof; plaster quoining on Type of site: House Previous use: Residential. Current use: House.	Cape Town, Wynberg	Wynberg	Provincial Heritage Site	34°00′20″S 18°27′44″E	Upload Photo
9/2/111/0002/021	India House and Durban House, 32-36 Durban Road, Wynberg, Cape Town	Single storey semi-detached vernacular building; half hipped thatched fanlight to Idoville and glazed Victorian door to Durban House; raised stoep with a low plastered wall and plastered brick columns supporting a timber pergola; Original outbuildings Type of site: House Current use: House.	Cape Town, Wynberg	Wynberg	Provincial Heritage Site	34°00′26″S 18°27′46″E	Single storey semi-detached vernacular building; half hipped thatched fanlight to Idoville and glazed Victorian door to Durban House; raised stoep with a low plastered wall and plastered brick columns supporting a timber pergola; Original outbuildings Type of site: House Current use: House.
9/2/111/0002/023	Glebe Cottage, Waterloo Road, Wynberg, Cape Town	Probably erected shortly after the second British occupation by the "Royal Engineers" and used as a chapel. In 1836 Lady D’Urban started a School of Industry in the building. From 1841 to 1845 it was used as the Wynberg Boys School.It has had various c .	Cape Town, Wynberg	Wynberg	Provincial Heritage Site	34°00′24″S 18°27′43″E	Upload Photo
9/2/111/0002/024	18 and 20 Durban Road, Wynberg, Cape Town	Free-standing single storey cottage with attic presently being extended and replastered; half hipped roof with IBR sheeting; plaster mouldings around openings on front facade; sash windows (24 panes), inappropriate unpainted shutters and new casement. Type of site: House Current use: House.	Cape Town, Wynberg	Wynberg	Provincial Heritage Site	34°00′20″S 18°27′44″E	Free-standing single storey cottage with attic presently being extended and replastered; half hipped roof with IBR sheeting; plaster mouldings around openings on front facade; sash windows (24 panes), inappropriate unpainted shutters and new casement. Type of site: House Current use: House.
9/2/111/0002/025	Long Cottage, 53 Durban Road, Wynberg, Cape Town	Free-standing L-shaped single storey cottage regarded as one of the finest and least-altered in old Wynberg; building well set back from street; full hipped thatch roof; possibly original sash windows (24 panes) and double leafed panelled door with glazi Type of site: House Current use: House.	Cape Town, Wynberg	Wynberg	Provincial Heritage Site	34°00′20″S 18°27′44″E	Free-standing L-shaped single storey cottage regarded as one of the finest and least-altered in old Wynberg; building well set back from street; full hipped thatch roof; possibly original sash windows (24 panes) and double leafed panelled door with glazi Type of site: House Current use: House.
9/2/111/0002/026	Kent and Albany, 4-6 Victoria Street, Wynberg, Cape Town	Semi-detached single storey vernacular cottage representing a later type of Wynberg dwelling; full hipped stepped thatched roof with a sharp hipped angle on Wolfe Street; possibly original sash windows and louvred shutters; panelled stable door; thatched Type of site: House Current use: House.	Cape Town, Wynberg	Wynberg	Provincial Heritage Site	34°02′37″S 18°29′29″E	Semi-detached single storey vernacular cottage representing a later type of Wynberg dwelling; full hipped stepped thatched roof with a sharp hipped angle on Wolfe Street; possibly original sash windows and louvred shutters; panelled stable door; thatched Type of site: House Current use: House.
9/2/111/0002/027	The Old Bakery, 23 Durban Road, Wynberg, Cape Town	Free-standing single storey vernacular cottage with later attic additions; well set back from street; traditional corrugated iron roof; sash windows (12 panes) and casements; re-used Cape Dutch windows and unpainted shutters; panelled doors. Type of site: Bakery Current use: House.	Cape Town, Wynberg	Wynberg	Provincial Heritage Site	34°00′20″S 18°27′44″E	Upload Photo
9/2/111/0002/028	Erin Cottage, 21 Wolfe Street, Wynberg, Cape Town	Single storey cottage attached to no. 2.6-a; full hipped corrugated iron roof; sash windows (24 panes); stable door with small-paned glazing; most of joinery is possibly original; low boundary wall of plastered brick piers and cast iron railings; Type of site: Commercial Previous use: Residential. Current use: Shop/Gallery/Tea room.	Cape Town, Wynberg	Wynberg	Provincial Heritage Site	34°00′25″S 18°27′47″E	Single storey cottage attached to no. 2.6-a; full hipped corrugated iron roof; sash windows (24 panes); stable door with small-paned glazing; most of joinery is possibly original; low boundary wall of plastered brick piers and cast iron railings; Type of site: Commercial Previous use: Residential. Current use: Shop/Gallery/Tea room.
9/2/111/0002/029	Pink Cottage, Young Lane, Wynberg, Cape Town	Free-standing single storey vernacular cottage on street edge; double pitched roof with aluminium strip sheeting and end bargeboards; possibly original sash windows (12 panes) with partly original glass; stable door with small-paned glazing; low stoep Type of site: House Current use: House.	Cape Town, Wynberg	Wynberg	Provincial Heritage Site	34°00′18″S 18°27′45″E	Free-standing single storey vernacular cottage on street edge; double pitched roof with aluminium strip sheeting and end bargeboards; possibly original sash windows (12 panes) with partly original glass; stable door with small-paned glazing; low stoep Type of site: House Current use: House.
9/2/111/0002/030	Parbhoo complex, 11 and 13 Wolfe Street, Wynberg, Cape Town	Single storey terraced shops; parapet wall with plaster moulding and painted urns; plastered quoining at corners and between shops; single pitched roof behind; glazed timber shopfronts on ceramic base (south end) and timber base (north end); Type of site: Commercial Current use: Personal services.	Cape Town, Wynberg	Wynberg	Provincial Heritage Site	34°00′24″S 18°27′48″E	Single storey terraced shops; parapet wall with plaster moulding and painted urns; plastered quoining at corners and between shops; single pitched roof behind; glazed timber shopfronts on ceramic base (south end) and timber base (north end); Type of site: Commercial Current use: Personal services.
9/2/111/0002/031	Church Hill, 10 Young Lane, Wynberg, Cape Town	Modern free-standing single storey cottage opening directly onto sidewalk; full hipped mazista slate roof; facebrick walls; sash windows (12 panes) and louvred shutters; recessed front door with small paned glazing; all joinery modern stock. Type of site: House Current use: House.	Cape Town, Wynberg	Wynberg	Provincial Heritage Site	34°00′19″S 18°27′47″E	Upload Photo
9/2/111/0002/032	Clover, Wolfe Street, Wynberg, Cape Town	Semi-detached single storey vernacular cottages well set back from street; full hipped corrugated iron roof; Victorian sash windows; panelled door with sidelights and fanlights in the Victorian tradition to 'Clover Cottage'; adjoining the building. Type of site: House Current use: House.	Cape Town, Wynberg	Wynberg	Provincial Heritage Site	34°00′25″S 18°27′48″E	Semi-detached single storey vernacular cottages well set back from street; full hipped corrugated iron roof; Victorian sash windows; panelled door with sidelights and fanlights in the Victorian tradition to 'Clover Cottage'; adjoining the building. Type of site: House Current use: House.
9/2/111/0002/033	Boot Inn, 6 Standard Lane, Wynberg, Cape Town	Free-standing single storey vernacular cottage; double pitched corrugated iron roof with gable ends; sash windows (12 panes) and louvred shutters; solid panelled door with fanlight; all possibly original; plastered boundary wall. Type of site: Dwelling, Hotel Current use: House.	Cape Town, Wynberg	Wynberg	Provincial Heritage Site	34°00′20″S 18°27′46″E	Free-standing single storey vernacular cottage; double pitched corrugated iron roof with gable ends; sash windows (12 panes) and louvred shutters; solid panelled door with fanlight; all possibly original; plastered boundary wall. Type of site: Dwelling, Hotel Current use: House.
9/2/111/0002/034 &59	Dunkling, 43a Wolfe Street, Wynberg, Cape Town	Semi-detached double storey dwelling probably Victorianised. Full hipped corrugated iron roof; plaster quoining around upper floor openings; and a plaster band at position of removed verandah; sash windows of later Victorian type. Type of site: House Current use: House.	Cape Town, Wynberg	Wynberg	Provincial Heritage Site	34°00′30″S 18°27′45″E	Semi-detached double storey dwelling probably Victorianised. Full hipped corrugated iron roof; plaster quoining around upper floor openings; and a plaster band at position of removed verandah; sash windows of later Victorian type. Type of site: House Current use: House.
9/2/111/0002/035	In Fin Art Shop, 9 Wolfe Street, Wynberg, Cape Town	Free-standing double storey shop, now modernised, double pitched corrugated iron roof with bargeboards. Ground floor: traditional timber shopfront with modernised entrance and door on Wolfe Street; Modern fixed large windows (4 panes) on Durban Road; Type of site: Commercial Current use: Personal services.	Cape Town, Wynberg	Wynberg	Provincial Heritage Site	34°00′26″S 18°27′47″E	Free-standing double storey shop, now modernised, double pitched corrugated iron roof with bargeboards. Ground floor: traditional timber shopfront with modernised entrance and door on Wolfe Street; Modern fixed large windows (4 panes) on Durban Road; Type of site: Commercial Current use: Personal services.
9/2/111/0002/036	1, 2, 3, 4 and 5 Standard Lane, Wynberg, Cape Town	Terraced single storey vernacular coattages opening onto sidewalk; full hipped corrugated iron roof with projecting eaves over front facades; various modern stock doors, windows, and louvred shutters, unpainted joinery to no 1.27; high boundary wall to Type of site: House Current use: House. The historic Old Wynberg Village is an area of considerable character, as well as being of historical, architectural and environmental importance. It is one of the few areas close to the City of Cape Town that have retained their historical character.	Cape Town, Wynberg	Wynberg	Provincial Heritage Site	34°00′20″S 18°27′47″E	Terraced single storey vernacular coattages opening onto sidewalk; full hipped corrugated iron roof with projecting eaves over front facades; various modern stock doors, windows, and louvred shutters, unpainted joinery to no 1.27; high boundary wall to Type of site: House Current use: House. The historic Old Wynberg Village is an area of considerable character, as well as being of historical, architectural and environmental importance. It is one of the few areas close to the City of Cape Town that have retained their historical character.
9/2/111/0002/037	Little Marlow, Wolfe Street, Wynberg, Cape Town	Semi-detached single storey vernacular cottages well set back from street; full hipped corrugated iron roof; Victorian sash windows; panelled door with sidelights and fanlights in the Victorian tradition to 'Clover Cottage'; adjoining the building and a Type of site: House Current use: House.	Cape Town, Wynberg	Wynberg	Provincial Heritage Site	34°00′25″S 18°27′48″E	Upload Photo
9/2/111/0002/038	15 Wolfe Street, Wynberg, Cape Town	Single storey terraced shops; low pitched roof with large overhang; small-paned modern timber shop fronts on ceramic tiled base with splayed corners; recessed entrance doorways to shops. Double storey behind: double pitched fluted galvanised iron sheeting. Type of site: Commercial Current use: Personal services.	Cape Town, Wynberg	Wynberg	Provincial Heritage Site	34°00′23″S 18°27′48″E	Single storey terraced shops; low pitched roof with large overhang; small-paned modern timber shop fronts on ceramic tiled base with splayed corners; recessed entrance doorways to shops. Double storey behind: double pitched fluted galvanised iron sheeting. Type of site: Commercial Current use: Personal services.
9/2/111/0002/039	7a, 7b Durban Road cnr Wolfe Street, Wynberg, Cape Town	Double storey Victorian business with splayed corner treatment; gables and parapet with decorative plaster moulding and balusters with a full hipped corrugated iron roof behind; plaster quoining at corners; typical shopfronts to ground floor and sash Type of site: Commercial Current use: Personal services.	Cape Town, Wynberg	Wynberg	Provincial Heritage Site	34°00′22″S 18°27′44″E	Double storey Victorian business with splayed corner treatment; gables and parapet with decorative plaster moulding and balusters with a full hipped corrugated iron roof behind; plaster quoining at corners; typical shopfronts to ground floor and sash Type of site: Commercial Current use: Personal services.
9/2/111/0002/040	Somerset House, 31 Wolfe Street, Wynberg, Cape Town	Type of site: House Previous use: Shop. Current use: House.	Cape Town, Wynberg	Wynberg	Provincial Heritage Site	34°00′23″S 18°27′49″E	Type of site: House Previous use: Shop. Current use: House.
9/2/111/0002/041	Elim Row, 69-75 Durban Road, Wynberg, Cape Town		Cape Town, Wynberg	Wynberg	Provincial Heritage Site	34°00′20″S 18°27′44″E	
9/2/111/0002/042	Mercury House, Riebeeck Street, Wynberg, Cape Town	Free-standing single storey cottage altered to represent a Cape Dutch facade; full hipped corrugated iron roof behind a moulded parapet wall; modern unpainted sash window (32 panes)and unpainted two panelled front door with small-paned fanlight. Type of site: House Current use: House.	Cape Town, Wynberg	Wynberg	Provincial Heritage Site	34°00′24″S 18°27′45″E	Free-standing single storey cottage altered to represent a Cape Dutch facade; full hipped corrugated iron roof behind a moulded parapet wall; modern unpainted sash window (32 panes)and unpainted two panelled front door with small-paned fanlight. Type of site: House Current use: House.
9/2/111/0002/043	Waterloo Close, 9 Durban Road, Wynberg, Cape Town	Semi-detached single storey vernacular cottage; full hipped roof with asbestos cement tiles. Facade facing Durban Road: sash windows (12 panes) and louvred shutters; double leafed modern stock French door; intrusive unpainted modern garage door; Type of site: House Current use: House.	Cape Town, Wynberg	Wynberg	Provincial Heritage Site	34°00′21″S 18°27′44″E	Upload Photo
9/2/111/0002/045	Casa Nara, 41 Wolfe Street, Wynberg, Cape Town	Free-standing single storey Victorian building now subdivided into two shops with a dwelling attached; full hipped corrugated iron roof; evidence of ashlar plasterwork on facade facing Standard Lane; sash windows (4 panes); typical bay window and splayed Type of site: House Current use: House.	Cape Town, Wynberg	Wynberg	Provincial Heritage Site	34°00′18″S 18°27′49″E	Free-standing single storey Victorian building now subdivided into two shops with a dwelling attached; full hipped corrugated iron roof; evidence of ashlar plasterwork on facade facing Standard Lane; sash windows (4 panes); typical bay window and splayed Type of site: House Current use: House.
9/2/111/0002/046	Lord Nelson Cottage, 7 Lonsdale Street, Wynberg, Cape Town	Free-standing single storey vernacular cottage; double pitched roof with patent metal 'tiles' and bargeboards; sash windows (12 panes) and louvred shutters; single leaf panelled door; raised stoep with timber posts and curved brackets built into low Type of site: House Current use: House.	Cape Town, Wynberg	Wynberg	Provincial Heritage Site	34°00′33″S 18°27′48″E	Free-standing single storey vernacular cottage; double pitched roof with patent metal 'tiles' and bargeboards; sash windows (12 panes) and louvred shutters; single leaf panelled door; raised stoep with timber posts and curved brackets built into low Type of site: House Current use: House.
9/2/111/0002/047	Spes Bona and Unicorn House, cnr Durban and Victoria Road, Wynberg, Cape Town	Free-standing single storey Victorianised house with attic now sub-divided into two dwellings with later additions; double pitched corrugated asbestos cement roof with decorative bargeboards. Facade facing Durban Road: two projecting wings with verandah Type of site: House Current use: House.	Cape Town, Wynberg	Wynberg	Provincial Heritage Site	34°02′10″S 18°29′16″E	Free-standing single storey Victorianised house with attic now sub-divided into two dwellings with later additions; double pitched corrugated asbestos cement roof with decorative bargeboards. Facade facing Durban Road: two projecting wings with verandah Type of site: House Current use: House.
9/2/111/0002/049	11 Durban Road, Wynberg, Cape Town		Cape Town, Wynberg	Wynberg	Provincial Heritage Site	34°00′21″S 18°27′44″E	
9/2/111/0002/050	Chelsea Cloisters, 48 -54 Durban Road, Wynberg, Cape Town	Modern double storey block of maisonettes; double pitched roof with bargeboards; modern stock painted steel casement windows and timber doors with concrete ledge above; low facebrick boundary wall. Type of site: House Current use: Maisonettes.	Cape Town, Wynberg	Wynberg	Provincial Heritage Site	34°00′11″S 18°27′28″E	Modern double storey block of maisonettes; double pitched roof with bargeboards; modern stock painted steel casement windows and timber doors with concrete ledge above; low facebrick boundary wall. Type of site: House Current use: Maisonettes.
9/2/111/0002/051	Fig Tree Cottage, Cruse Lane, Wynberg, Cape Town	Free-standing single storey vernacular cottage with projecting side wings; double pitched corrugated iron roof with bargeboards; remains of ashlar plasterwork evident; sash windows (24 panes) and louvred shutters; small bay window extension on north side Type of site: House Current use: House.	Cape Town, Wynberg	Wynberg	Provincial Heritage Site	34°00′22″S 18°27′48″E	Upload Photo
9/2/111/0002/053	Rembrandt, 9 Victoria Street, Wynberg, Cape Town	Free-standing single storey vernacular cottage consisting of 'two parallel units each with a half hipped thatched roof; the intervening narrow passage in which the front door is set, is roofed over with a flat roof'; sash windows (24 panes); Type of site: House Current use: House.	Cape Town, Wynberg	Wynberg	Provincial Heritage Site	34°00′30″S 18°27′47″E	Free-standing single storey vernacular cottage consisting of 'two parallel units each with a half hipped thatched roof; the intervening narrow passage in which the front door is set, is roofed over with a flat roof'; sash windows (24 panes); Type of site: House Current use: House.
9/2/111/0002/055	Withens, 3 Carr Hill, Wynberg, Cape Town	Free-standing double storey house at right angles to street; full hipped roof with asbestos cement slates; marmoran finish to walls; painted steel casement windows; double leaf modern stock door. Type of site: House Current use: House.	Cape Town, Wynberg	Wynberg	Provincial Heritage Site	34°00′16″S 18°27′46″E	Upload Photo
9/2/111/0002/057	9 Lonsdale Street, Wynberg, Cape Town	Free-standing single storey l-shaped cottage; double pitched roof with asbestos cement tiles and bargeboards; plaster moulding around openings; various windows; modern stock door with sidelights; unpainted timber picket fence on boundary. Type of site: House Current use: House.	Cape Town, Wynberg	Wynberg	Provincial Heritage Site	34°00′33″S 18°27′46″E	Upload Photo
9/2/111/0002/058	Petersklip, Piers Road; 49 & 51 Durban Road; The Armoury, Wolfe Street and The Coach House, Piers Road, Wynberg, Cape Town	The historic Old Wynberg Village is an area of considerable character, as well as being of historical, architectural and environmental importance. It is one of the few areas close to the City of Cape Town that have retained their historical character.	Cape Town, Wynberg	Wynberg	Provincial Heritage Site	34°00′28″S 18°27′47″E	The historic Old Wynberg Village is an area of considerable character, as well as being of historical, architectural and environmental importance. It is one of the few areas close to the City of Cape Town that have retained their historical character.
9/2/111/0002/062	The Bell House, Roos Lane, Wynberg, Cape Town	Free-standing single storey vernacular cottage at right angles to street; double pitched corrugated iron with timberbarge boards; sash windows (24 panes); new unpainted stock louvred shutters inappropriate to windows; unpainted door with decorative fanlight. Type of site: House Current use: House.	Cape Town, Wynberg	Wynberg	Provincial Heritage Site	33°58′10″S 18°28′30″E	Upload Photo
9/2/111/0002/063	Oak Cottage and The Cottage, 27 and 29 Durban Road, Wynberg, Cape Town	Semi-detached single storey dwelling with new dormers; thatched roof, half-hipped on south end and gable on north end; early sash windows (12 panes); new double casement dormer windows; half full window height louvred shutters. ' Oak Cottage' and full Type of site: House Current use: House.	Cape Town, Wynberg	Wynberg	Provincial Heritage Site	34°00′20″S 18°27′44″E	Semi-detached single storey dwelling with new dormers; thatched roof, half-hipped on south end and gable on north end; early sash windows (12 panes); new double casement dormer windows; half full window height louvred shutters. ' Oak Cottage' and full Type of site: House Current use: House.
9/2/111/0002/064	Hodi Mihi, 2 Carr Hill, Wynberg, Cape Town	Free-standing single storey vernacular cottage with attic. Full hipped thatch roof; Victorian sashes (4 panes) to ground floor are probably replacements of original casements; double casement dormer windows new but single casement said to be original; Type of site: House Current use: House.	Cape Town, Wynberg	Wynberg	Provincial Heritage Site	34°00′16″S 18°27′47″E	Free-standing single storey vernacular cottage with attic. Full hipped thatch roof; Victorian sashes (4 panes) to ground floor are probably replacements of original casements; double casement dormer windows new but single casement said to be original; Type of site: House Current use: House.
9/2/111/0002/50	Chelsea Cloisters, 48 Durban Road, Wynberg		Wynberg	Wynberg		34°00′26″S 18°27′46″E	Upload Photo
9/2/111/0002/60	The Coach House and the Armory, Wolfe Street, Wynberg		Wynberg	Wynberg			Upload Photo
9/2/111/0004	Victoria Hospital, Wynberg, Cape Town		Wynberg	Wynberg		34°00′45″S 18°27′32″E	Upload Photo
9/2/111/0006	WYNBERG MUNICIPAL AREA GENERAL		Wynberg	Wynberg			
9/2/111/0006-002	1 Brian Mansergh Close, Wynberg, Cape Town		Cape Town, Wynberg	Wynberg	Provincial Heritage Site	34°00′31″S 18°27′50″E	
9/2/111/0006-011	Coach House, Piers Road, Wynberg, Cape Town	Type of site: Coach House.	Cape Town, Wynberg	Wynberg	Provincial Heritage Site	34°00′26″S 18°28′01″E	Type of site: Coach House.
9/2/111/0006-020	14 Langley Road, Wynberg, Cape Town		Cape Town, Wynberg	Wynberg	Provincial Heritage Site	34°00′36″S 18°28′03″E	Media related to 14 Langley Road, Wynberg at Wikimedia Commons
9/2/111/0006-030	23 Wellington Road, Wynberg, Cape Town		Cape Town, Wynberg	Wynberg	Provincial Heritage Site	34°00′34″S 18°27′56″E	
9/2/111/0006-038	25 Wellington Road, Wynberg, Cape Town		Cape Town, Wynberg	Wynberg	Provincial Heritage Site	34°00′34″S 18°28′01″E	
9/2/111/0008	Trovato, 44 Coach Road, Wynberg, Cape Town		Cape Town, Wynberg	Wynberg	Provincial Heritage Site	33°59′54″S 18°27′25″E	Upload Photo
9/2/111/0010	Winthrop House, 8 Durban Road, Wynberg, Cape Town	Free-standing single storey vernacular cottage with attic; new full hipped thatch roof; presently unpainted sash windows (24 panes) c1830 (F & C); solid panelled door; raised stoep with end seats; pergola with new garage well set back from street. Type of site: House Current use: House.	Cape Town, Wynberg	Wynberg	Provincial Heritage Site	34°00′19″S 18°27′44″E	Free-standing single storey vernacular cottage with attic; new full hipped thatch roof; presently unpainted sash windows (24 panes) c1830 (F & C); solid panelled door; raised stoep with end seats; pergola with new garage well set back from street. Type of site: House Current use: House.
9/2/111/0016	2 Brian Mansergh Close, Wynberg, Cape Town		Cape Town, Wynberg	Wynberg	Provincial Heritage Site	34°00′31″S 18°27′50″E	Upload Photo
9/2/111/002	WYNBERG VILLAGE, GENERAL		Wynberg	Wynberg			Upload Photo
9/2/111/002/1	53-55 Waterloo Road, Wynberg, Cape Town		Wynberg	Wynberg		34°00′30″S 18°27′44″E	Upload Photo
9/2/111/002/13	10-12 Durban Road, Wynberg, Cape Town		Wynberg	Wynberg		34°00′24″S 18°27′45″E	Upload Photo
9/2/111/002/18	9 Riebeeck Street, Wynberg, Cape town		Wynberg	Wynberg		34°00′24″S 18°27′46″E	Upload Photo
9/2/111/002/2	35-43 Durban Road, Wynberg, Cape Town		Wynberg	Wynberg		34°00′26″S 18°27′46″E	Upload Photo
9/2/111/002/3	Young Lane, Wynberg, Cape Town (new terrace houses)		Wynberg	Wynberg		34°00′19″S 18°27′47″E	Upload Photo
9/2/111/002/44	Chelsea Horse, cnr Wolfe & Riebeeck Streets, Wynberg, Cape Town		Wynberg	Wynberg		34°00′24″S 18°27′48″E	Upload Photo
9/2/111/002/48	Ashley, Shirley, Ivanhoe and Mega cottages, Lonsdale Road, Wynberg		Wynberg	Wynberg		34°00′32″S 18°27′45″E	Upload Photo
9/2/111/002/5	Chelsea Corner, 59-63 Waterloo Road, Wynberg, Cape Town		Wynberg	Wynberg		34°00′32″S 18°27′44″E	Upload Photo
9/2/111/002/52	Hastings Place, Wynberg Village		Wynberg	Wynberg			Upload Photo
9/2/111/002/54	5 Riebeeck Street, Wynberg		Wynberg	Wynberg		34°00′23″S 18°27′47″E	Upload Photo
9/2/111/002/56	7 Mortimer Rd, Wynberg		Wynberg	Wynberg		34°00′28″S 18°27′55″E	Upload Photo
9/2/111/002/61	Forrester’s Inn, Durban Road, Wynberg		Wynberg	Wynberg			Upload Photo
9/2/111/002/8	1 Cornwall Place, Wynberg, Cape Town		Wynberg	Wynberg		34°00′03″S 18°28′03″E	Upload Photo
9/2/111/0020	St Michael's Children's Home, Southfield, Cape Town		Southfield	Wynberg		34°01′00″S 18°28′09″E	Upload Photo
9/2/111/0025	Sandstone Chapel, Tokai, Cape Town	Type of site: Chapel Current use: Church : Anglican.	Cape Town, Tokai	Wynberg	Provincial Heritage Site	34°03′45″S 18°26′30″E	Type of site: Chapel Current use: Church : Anglican.
9/2/111/0044	4 Moore Road, Wynberg, Cape Town	Free-standing single storey cottage with projecting bay now extensively altered; double pitched roof Canadian pattern asbestos cement sheeting; plaster quoining and moulding above windows to projecting bay; sash windows; various louvred shutters to Type of site: House Current use: House.	Cape Town, Wynberg	Wynberg	Provincial Heritage Site	34°00′31″S 18°27′47″E	Upload Photo
9/2/111/0046	Wynberg Town Hall, Maynard Road, Maynard Road, Wynberg Cape Town		Wynberg	Wynberg			Upload Photo
9/2/111/0051	Wynberg Military Base, Wynberg, Cape Town		Wynberg	Wynberg		34°00′32″S 18°27′41″E	Upload Photo
9/2/111/0051/001	Officer's Mess, Wynberg Military Camp, Wynberg, Cape Town	The Officers' Mess was built about 1880 or earlier, and is the heart of the Wynberg Military Camp which already existed in 1797. Type of site: Mess.	Cape Town, Wynberg	Wynberg	Provincial Heritage Site	34°00′17″S 18°28′17″E	Upload Photo
9/2/111/0053	Tenderden, 60 Durban Road, Wynberg, Cape Town	Type of site: House.	Cape Town, Wynberg	Wynberg	Provincial Heritage Site	34°00′20″S 18°27′44″E	Type of site: House.
9/2/111/0055	Steenberg, Tokai, Cape Town	Steenberg (previously Zwaanswyk), which was granted to Catharina Ustings in 1688 was one of the first farms in the region. The Cape Dutch homestead was erected in about 1740. The verandah and outbuildings date from the beginning of the nineteenth century.	Cape Town, Tokai	Wynberg	Provincial Heritage Site	34°03′50″S 18°26′41″E	Upload Photo
9/2/111/0059	43-45 Waterloo Road, Wynberg, Cape Town	Single storey Victorian house now subdivided into two dwellings; double pitched corrugated iron roof with bargeboards and timber finial on projecting portion; painted brickwork to north end dwelling; sash windows; double leafed glazed doors and fanlights Type of site: House Current use: House.	Cape Town, Wynberg	Wynberg	Provincial Heritage Site	34°00′27″S 18°27′46″E	Upload Photo
9/2/111/0073	Cape Education Museum, 9 Aliwal Road, Wynberg, Cape Town	Type of site: Educational Previous use: Primary school. Current use: Museum.	Cape Town, Wynberg	Wynberg	Provincial Heritage Site	34°00′05″S 18°27′59″E	Type of site: Educational Previous use: Primary school. Current use: Museum.
9/2/111/0080	Wittebomen, Wynberg District		Wynberg	Wynberg			Upload Photo
9/2/111/0085	Block bounded by Piers, Durban, Wolfe Streets, Erf 90986, Wynberg		Wynberg	Wynberg		34°00′26″S 18°27′47″E	Upload Photo
9/2/111/0085/01	Petersklip, Piers Road, Wynberg		Wynberg	Wynberg		34°00′27″S 18°27′52″E	Upload Photo
9/2/111/0085/02	"West Villa", 49 & 51 Durban Road, Wynberg		Wynberg	Wynberg		34°00′28″S 18°27′47″E	Upload Photo
9/2/111/0085/03	The Armoury, Wolfe Street, Wynberg		Wynberg	Wynberg			Upload Photo
9/2/111/0085/04	The Coach House, Piers Road, Wynberg		Wynberg	Wynberg			Upload Photo
9/2/111/0090	Wynberg Park, Wynberg, Cape Town		Wynberg	Wynberg		34°00′05″S 18°27′12″E	
9/2/111/0092	Dunheved, 14 Main Road, Wynberg, Cape Town		Wynberg	Wynberg		34°00′11″S 18°28′09″E	Upload Photo
9/2/111/0093	La Plaisance, 2 Main Road, Wynberg, Cape Town		Wynberg	Wynberg		34°00′10″S 18°28′09″E	Upload Photo
9/2/111/0095	Wynberg Station precinct, Wynberg, Cape Town		Wynberg	Wynberg		34°00′15″S 18°27′54″E	Upload Photo
9/2/111/0097	4 Bexhill Road, Wynberg, Cape Town		Wynberg	Wynberg		34°00′19″S 18°28′19″E	Upload Photo
9/2/111/0099	Reference see 9/2/111/0127			Wynberg			Upload Photo
9/2/111/0100	Dutch Reformed Mission Church, Aliwal Road, Wynberg, Cape Town		Wynberg	Wynberg		34°00′14″S 18°27′50″E	Upload Photo
9/2/111/0103	Dutch Reformed Church, Carr Hill Road, Wynberg, Cape Town	Church halls: Two parallel rectangular halls; double pitched roof with asbestos cement slates to earlier hall and cement tiles to new addition; Steel casement windows; standard modern stock doors. A Dutch Reformed Church was built here in 1831. In 1899 it was replaced by the present fine building. For more than a century and a half most of the inhabitants of this remote area belonged to the mother congregation in Cape Town. It was difficult for th Type of site: Church Current use: Church : Dutch Reformed. HISTORICAL INTEREST. A Dutch Reformed Church was built here in 1831. In 1899 it was replaced by the present fine building.	Cape Town, Wynberg	Wynberg	Provincial Heritage Site	34°00′16″S 18°27′46″E	Church halls: Two parallel rectangular halls; double pitched roof with asbestos cement slates to earlier hall and cement tiles to new addition; Steel casement windows; standard modern stock doors. A Dutch Reformed Church was built here in 1831. In 1899 it was replaced by the present fine building. For more than a century and a half most of the inhabitants of this remote area belonged to the mother congregation in Cape Town. It was difficult for th Type of site: Church Current use: Church : Dutch Reformed. HISTORICAL INTEREST. A Dutch Reformed Church was built here in 1831. In 1899 it was replaced by the present fine building.
9/2/111/0107	Hawthorndon House, Herschell Walk, Wynberg, Cape Town	The core of this double-storeyed house probably dates from 1683. The house was rebuilt in its present French Victorian style in 1881 by Capt. John Spence. Sir J. B. Robinson bought Hawthornden in 1891 and lived there until his death in 1927. Count Natale Type of site: House. The core of this double-storeyed house probably dates from 1683. The house was rebuilt in its present French Victorian style in 1881 by Capt. John Spence. Sir J. B. Robinson bought Hawthornden in 1891 and lived there until his death in 1927. Count Natale	Cape Town, Wynberg	Wynberg	Provincial Heritage Site	33°59′53″S 18°27′28″E	The core of this double-storeyed house probably dates from 1683. The house was rebuilt in its present French Victorian style in 1881 by Capt. John Spence. Sir J. B. Robinson bought Hawthornden in 1891 and lived there until his death in 1927. Count Natale Type of site: House. The core of this double-storeyed house probably dates from 1683. The house was rebuilt in its present French Victorian style in 1881 by Capt. John Spence. Sir J. B. Robinson bought Hawthornden in 1891 and lived there until his death in 1927. Count Natale
9/2/111/0112	Monterey, Klaasens Road, Wynberg, Cape Town	Type of site: House.	Cape Town, Wynberg	Wynberg	Provincial Heritage Site	33°59′45″S 18°26′32″E	Upload Photo
9/2/111/0114	34 and 36 Wellington Road, Wynberg, Cape Town		Cape Town, Wynberg	Wynberg	Provincial Heritage Site	34°00′34″S 18°28′02″E	
9/2/111/0115	34 Wellington Road, Wynberg, Cape Town		Cape Town, Wynberg	Wynberg	Provincial Heritage Site	34°00′33″S 18°28′01″E	
9/2/111/0115	36 Wellington Road, Wynberg, Cape Town		Cape Town, Wynberg	Wynberg	Provincial Heritage Site	34°00′33″S 18°28′01″E	
9/2/111/0116	47 Cogill Road, Wynberg, Cape Town	Type of site: House.	Cape Town, Wynberg	Wynberg	Provincial Heritage Site	34°00′33″S 18°28′01″E	Upload Photo
9/2/111/0127	WYNBERG MAGISTERIAL DISTRICT, GENERAL		Wynberg	Wynberg			Upload Photo
9/2/111/0128	Conservation areas, Wynberg District		Wynberg	Wynberg			Upload Photo
9/2/111/0128/2	Conservation Velley conservation areas, Wynberg District		Wynberg	Wynberg			Upload Photo
9/2/111/0139	The Homestead, 23 Constantia Road, Wynberg, Cape Town	The building dates from the 1820s, possibly as a farmhouse to supply the garrison at Wynberg. It retains many original features, including internal and external joinery. Significant remodelling however occurred in the later Victorian period and further	Cape Town, Wynberg	Wynberg	Register	34°00′52″S 18°27′57″E	The building dates from the 1820s, possibly as a farmhouse to supply the garrison at Wynberg. It retains many original features, including internal and external joinery. Significant remodelling however occurred in the later Victorian period and further
9/2/111/0151	Springfield Convent Complex, Wynberg		Wynberg	Wynberg		34°00′10″S 18°27′27″E	Upload Photo
9/2/111/0154	Battswood School Complex, Wynberg		Wynberg	Wynberg		34°00′43″S 18°30′09″E	Upload Photo
9/2/111/0155	Maynardville, Block bounded by Wolfe, Church, Glaven and Piers Streets, Wynberg		Wynberg	Wynberg		34°00′20″S 18°27′57″E	
9/2/111/0157	Wynberg Relief Road, Wynberg District		Wynberg	Wynberg			Upload Photo
