= Van Riebeeck's Hedge =

Ancient hedge in South Africa

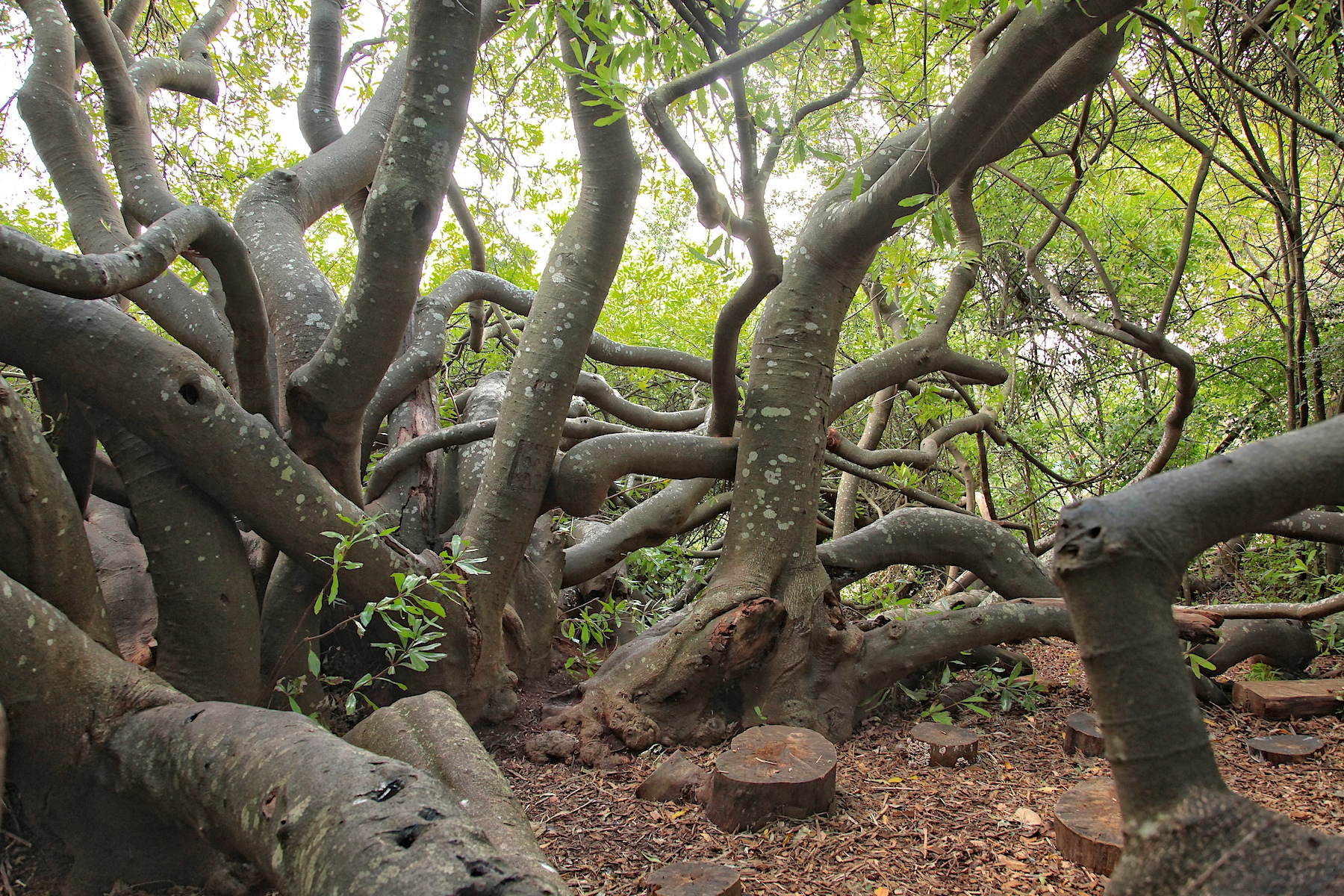
Section of Van Riebeeck's Hedge in Kirstenbosch

Van Riebeeck's Hedge is a hedge planted in 1660 by Jan van Riebeeck to mark the border of the Dutch East India Company settlement in what is now Cape Town, South Africa. The hedge consisted of indigenous wild almond trees (Brabejum stellatifolium). Sections of the hedge can still be seen in Kirstenbosch National Botanical Garden and Bishopscourt, and have been declared a National Monument.
