= Jacob Letterstedt =

Swedish businessman

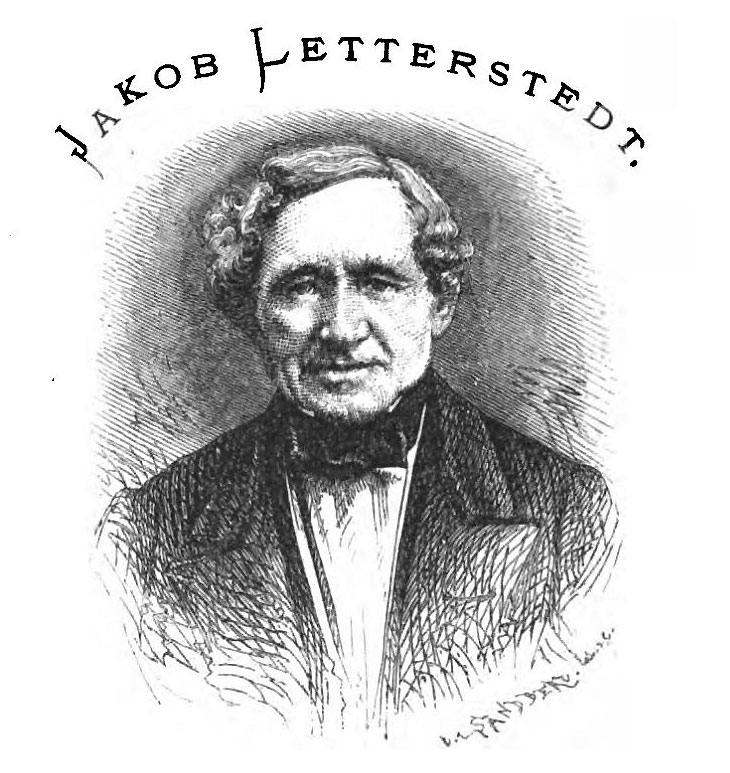
- c.1875
- Born: Jacob Lallerstedt; 15 December 1796; Östergötland, Sweden
- Died: 18 March 1862 (aged 65); Paris, France

Jacob Letterstedt (born Lallerstedt; 15 December 1796 – 18 March 1862) was a Swedish businessman who settled in the Cape Colony (part of present-day South Africa).

Lallerstedt was born in the parish of Vallerstad (present Mjölby Municipality) in Östergötland County. He arrived at Cape Town in 1820, where he made his fortune in the grain trade. Later he founded the company that became South African Breweries. In 1839 he was appointed acting honorary consul of Sweden-Norway, in 1841 ordinary consul and in 1857 consul general.

Letterstedt donated money to several prizes and to the Letterstedt Association, which promotes Nordic cooperation. In 1860, he was elected a member of the Royal Swedish Academy of Sciences. The same year he returned to Europe and was living in Paris at the time of his death.

Diplomatic posts
| Preceded by None | Honorary Consul (General) of Sweden-Norway to the Cape Colony; 1841–1862 | Succeeded by Per Oscar Hedelius |
